= D2 road (Croatia) =

Road in Croatia

D2 state road

Route information
- Part of
- Length: 347.9 km (216.2 mi)

Major junctions
- From: Dubrava Križovljanska border crossing to Slovenia
- D35 near Varaždin D3 near Varaždin; D528 near Varaždin; D530 in Zamlaka; D24 in Poljanec; D41 in Koprivnica; D210 in Virje; D43 in Đurđevac; D5 near Virovitica; D34 in Slatina and near Osijek; D69 in Slatina; D314 near Orahovica; D53 in Našice; D515 near Našice; A5 in Osijek interchange D7 near Osijek; D518 near Osijek; D213 and D417 near Osijek; D418 near Klisa; D55 in Borovo Naselje; D519 in Borovo Naselje D57 in Vukovar
- To: Ilok border crossing to Serbia

Location
- Country: Croatia
- Counties: Varaždin, Koprivnica-Križevci, Virovitica-Podravina, Osijek-Baranja, Vukovar-Srijem
- Major cities: Varaždin, Koprivnica, Virovitica, Našice, Osijek, Vukovar, Ilok

Highway system
- Highways in Croatia

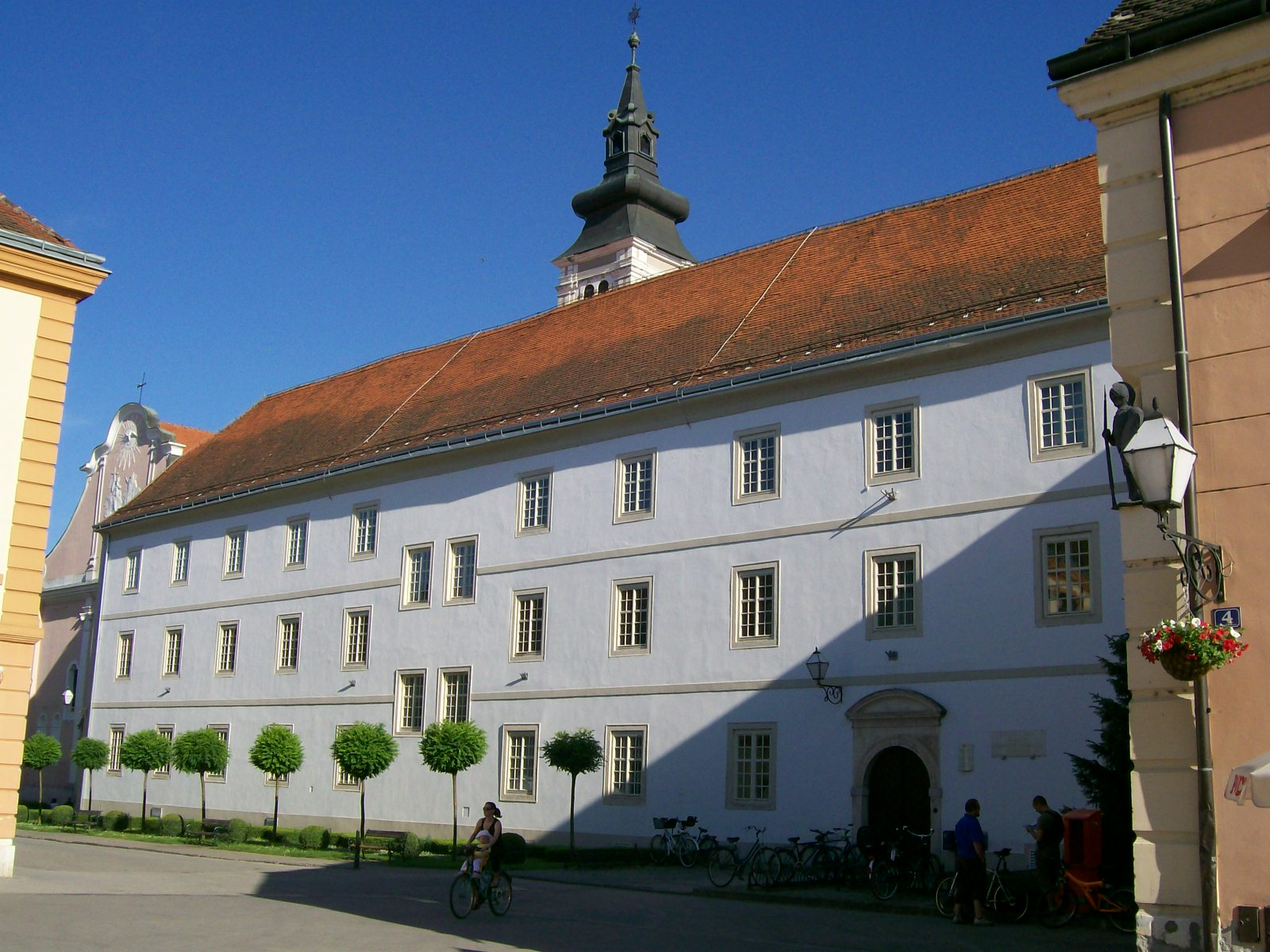
Varaždin, on the D2 road route

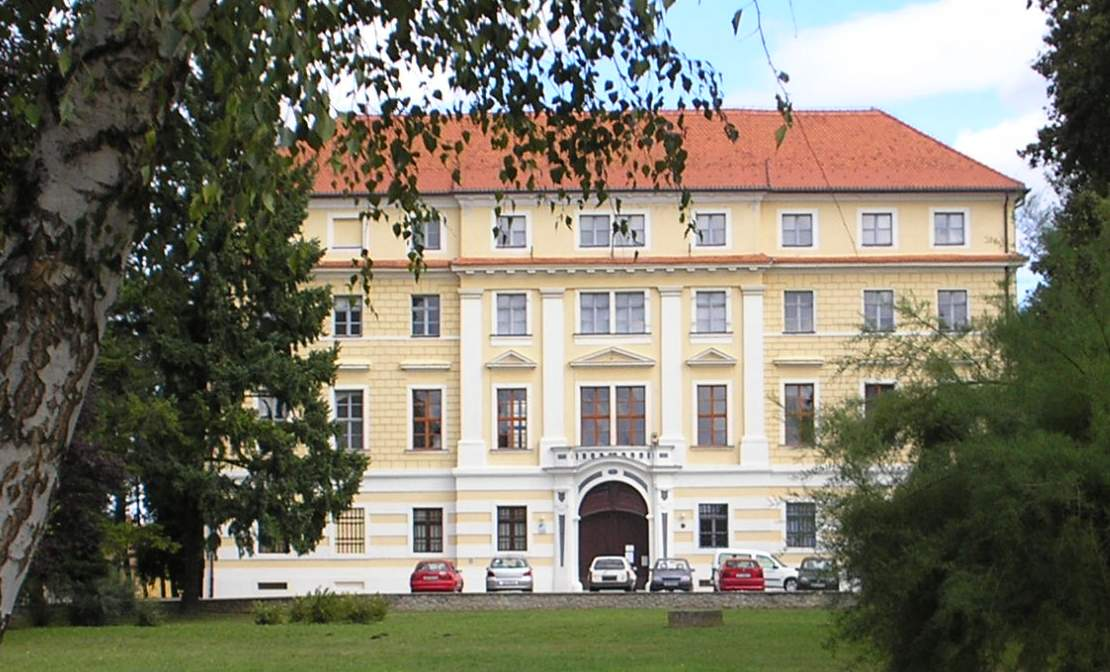
Ludbreg, on the D2 road route

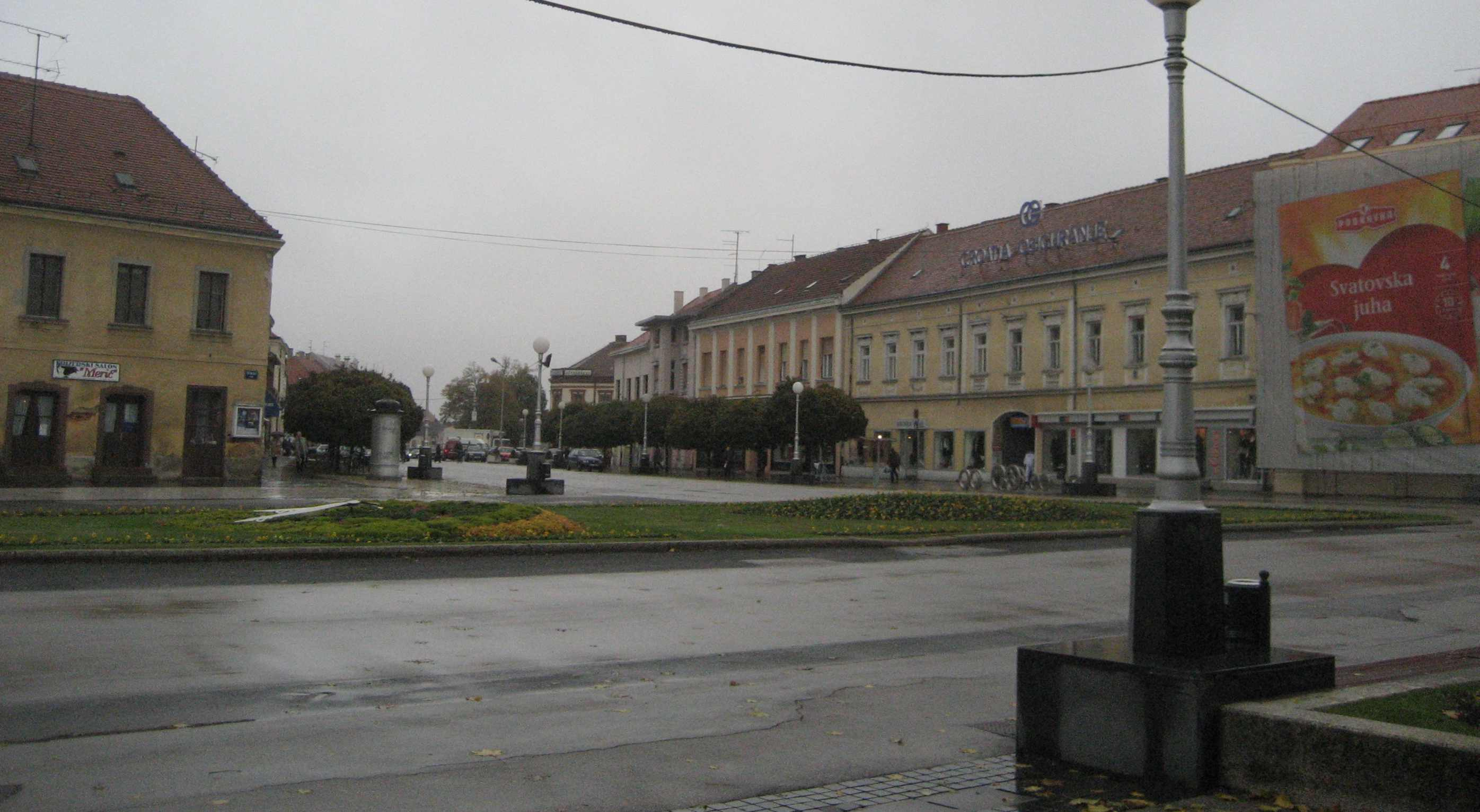
Koprivnica, on the D2 road route

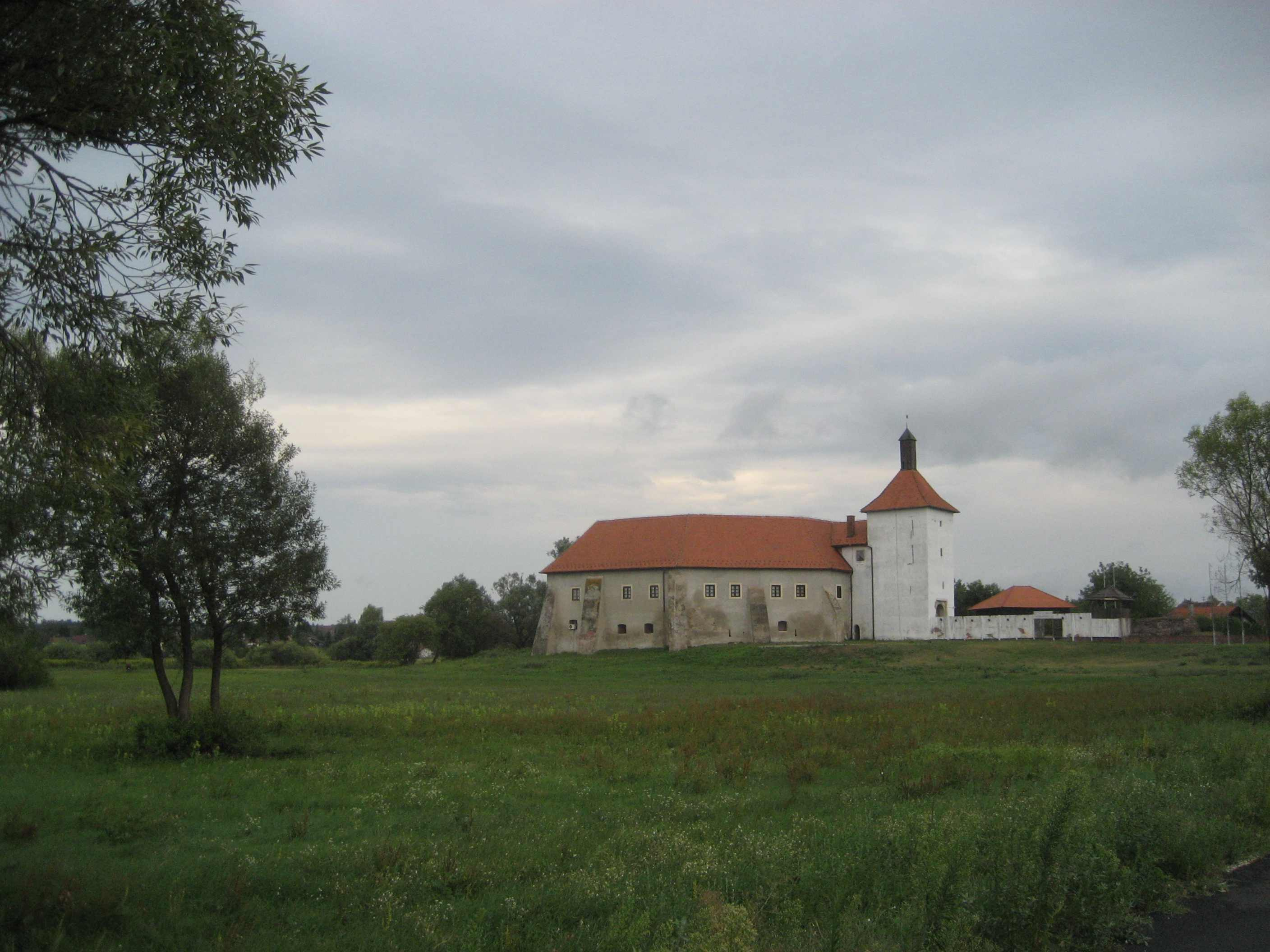
Đurđevac, on the D2 road route

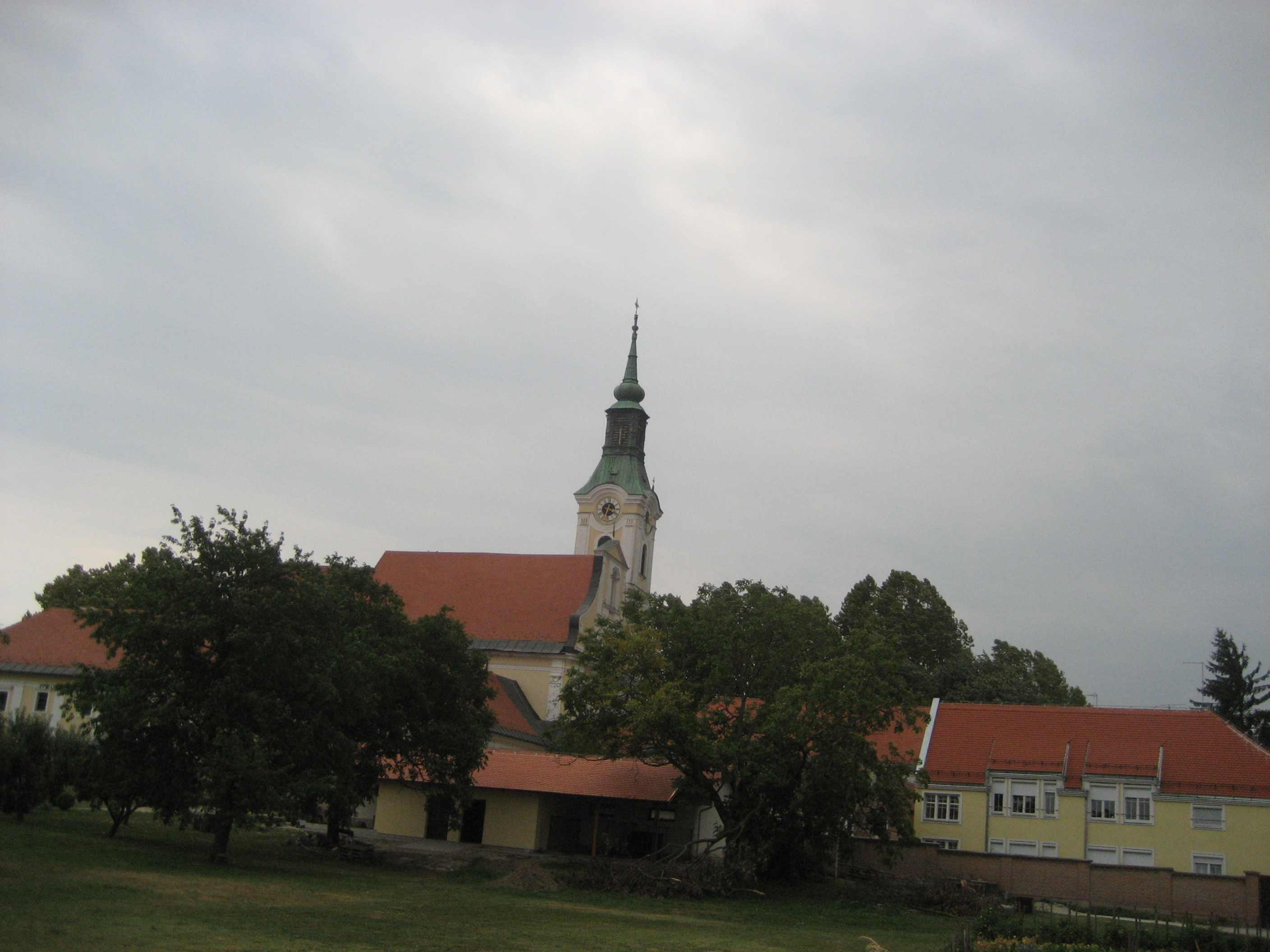
Virovitica, on the D2 road route

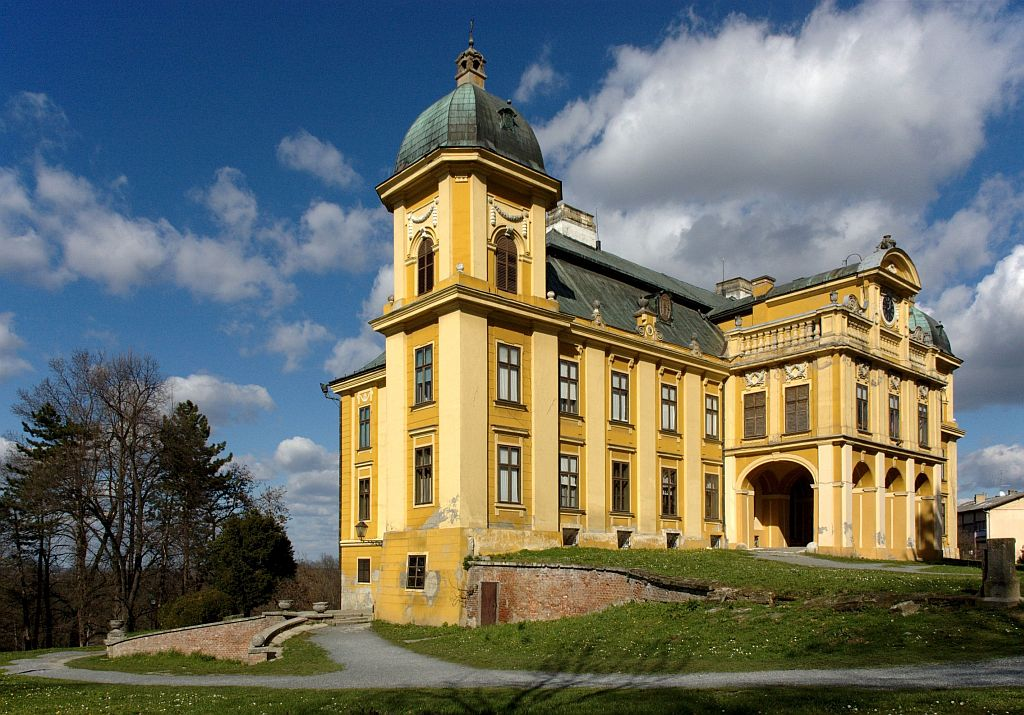
Našice, on the D2 road route

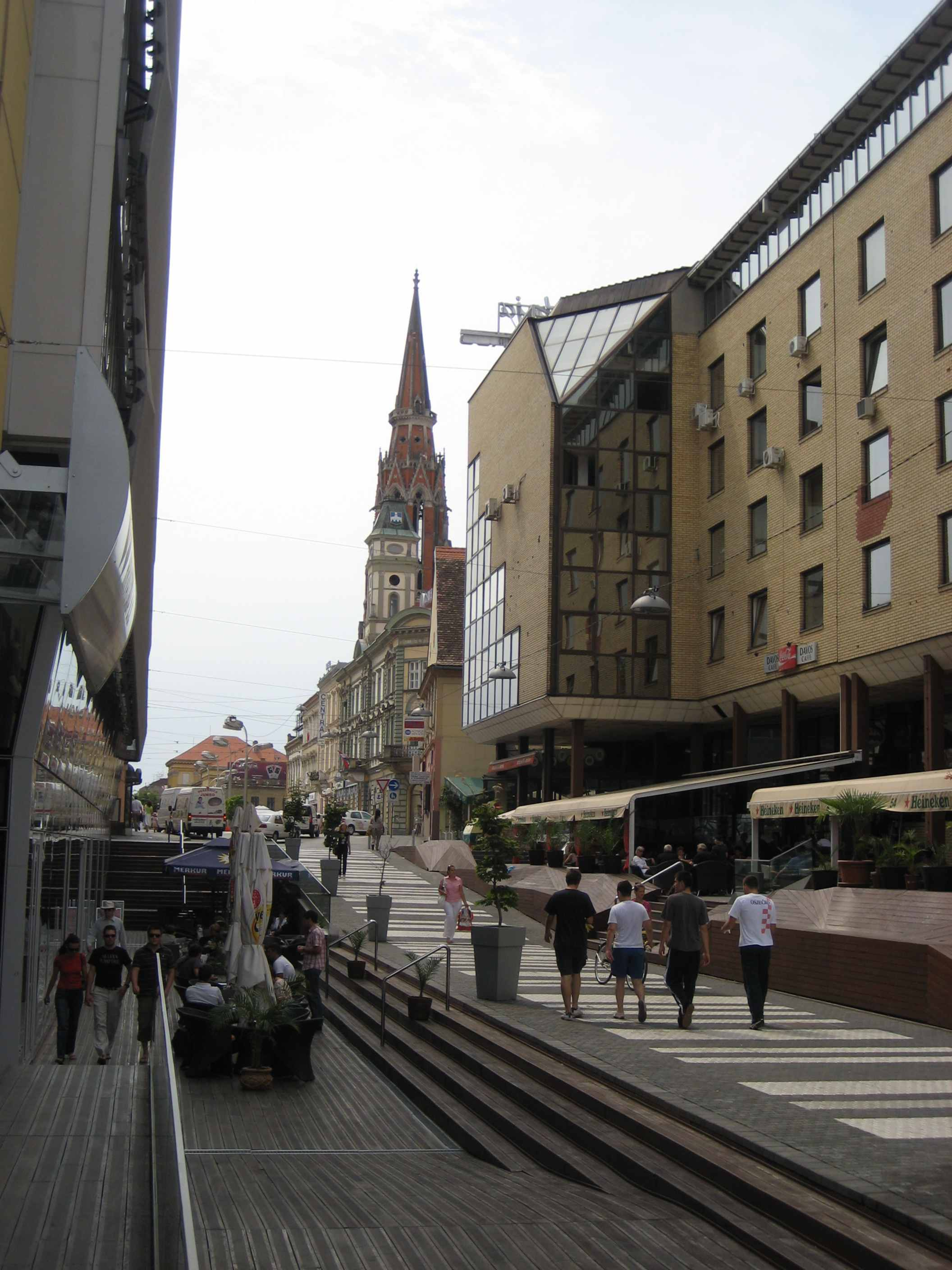
Osijek, next to the D2 road route

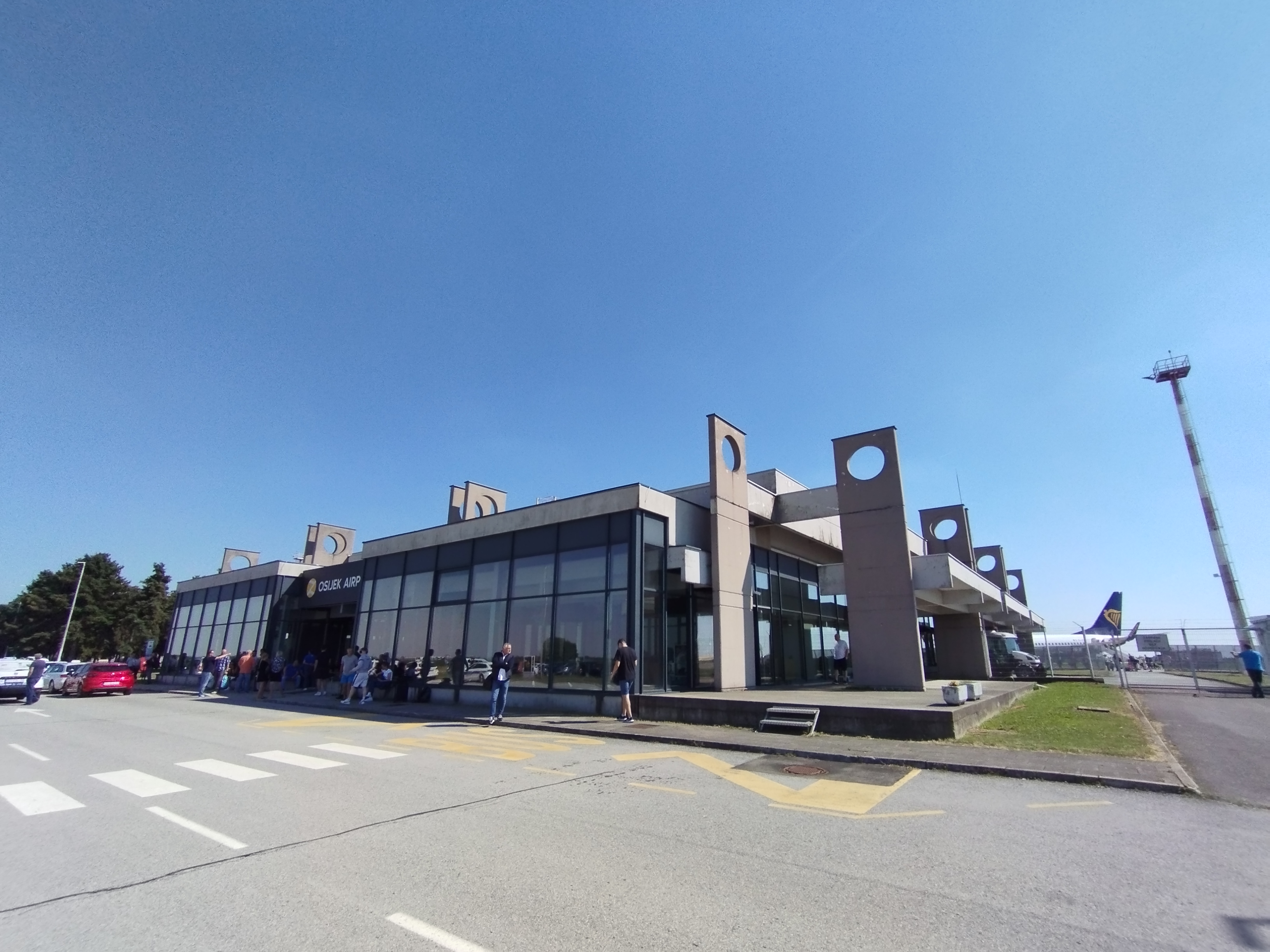
Osijek Airport, next to the D2 road route

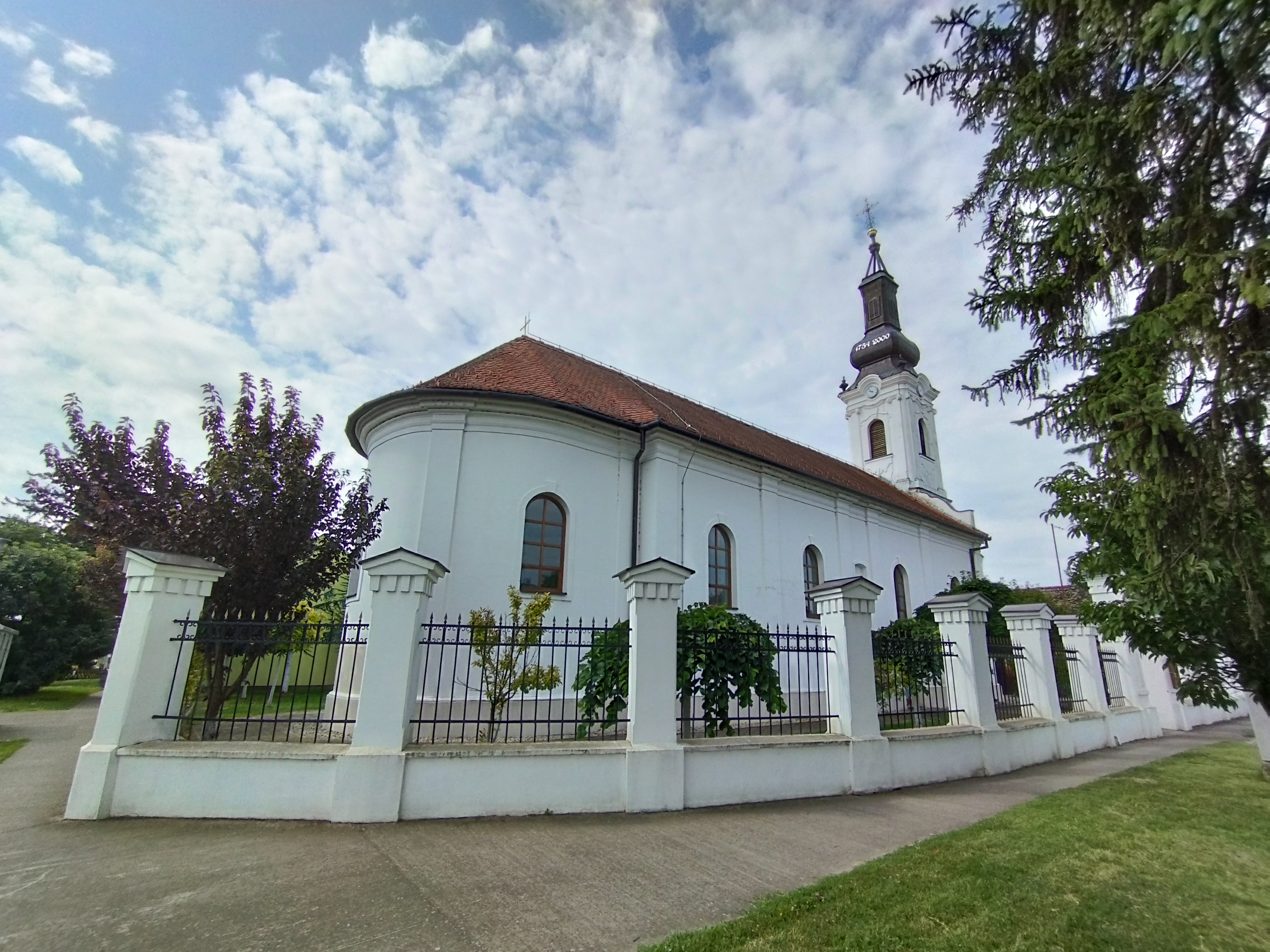
Church of the Transfiguration of the Lord, Trpinja on the D2 road route

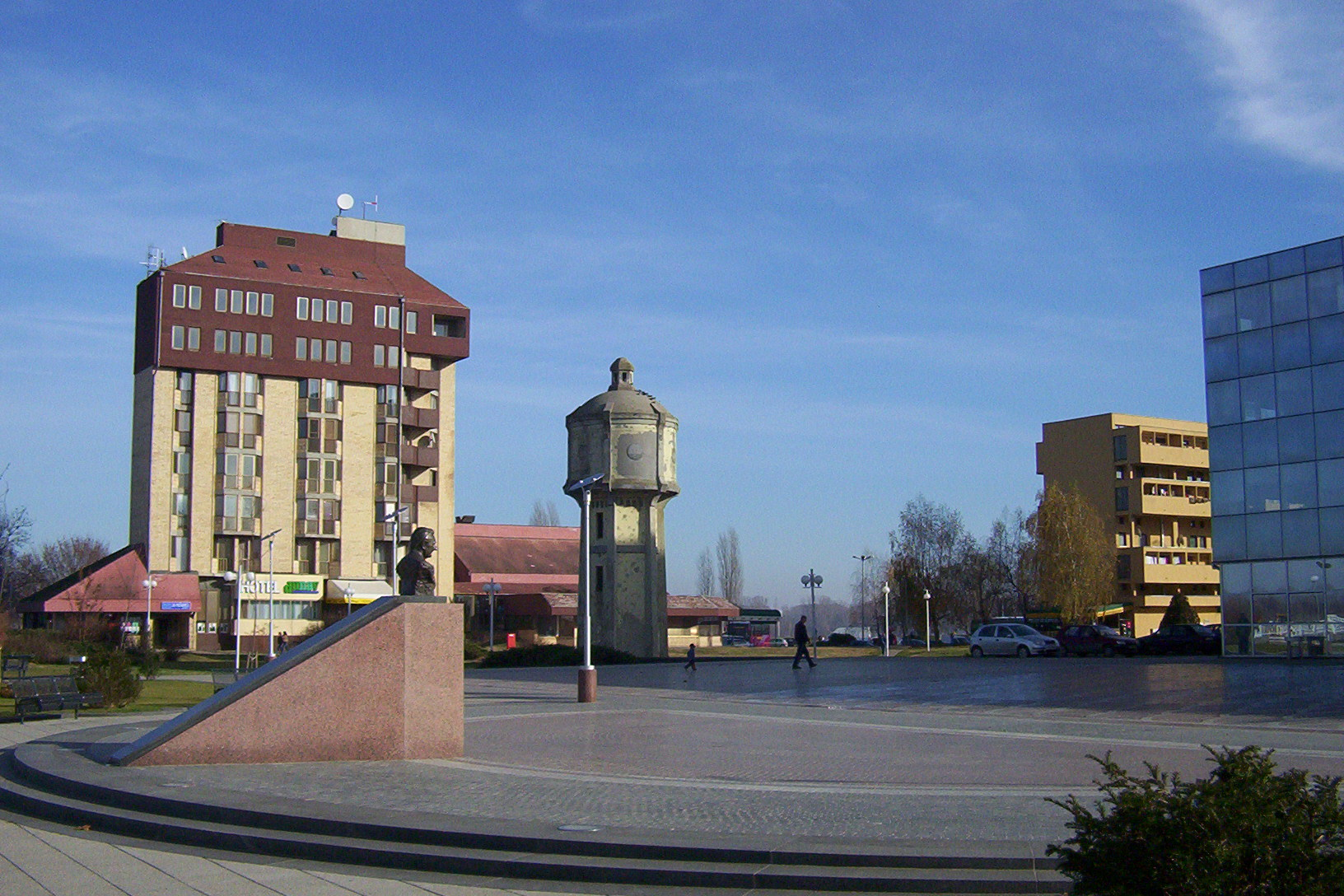
Vukovar, on the D2 road route

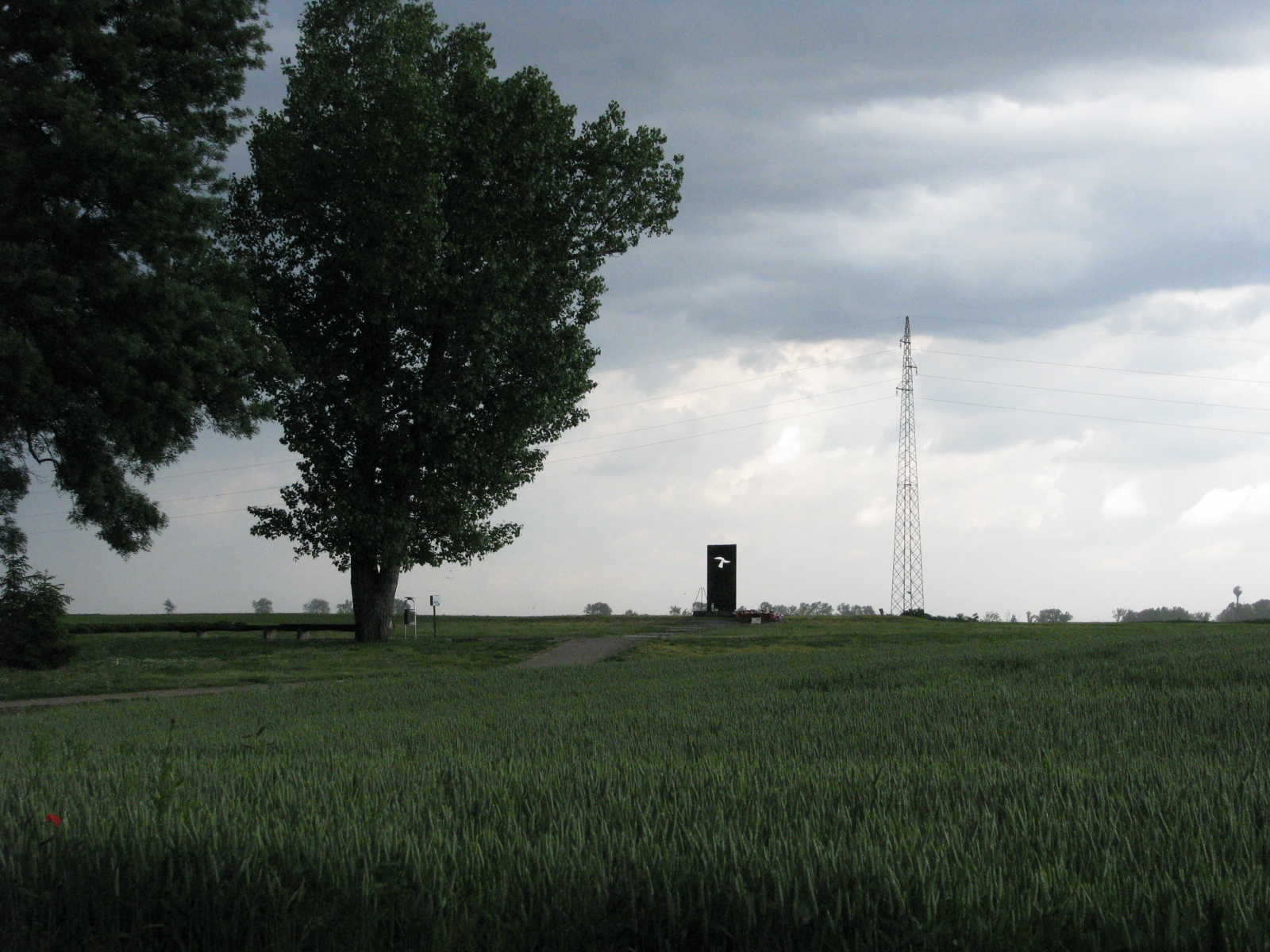
Ovčara memorial centre, next to the D2 road route

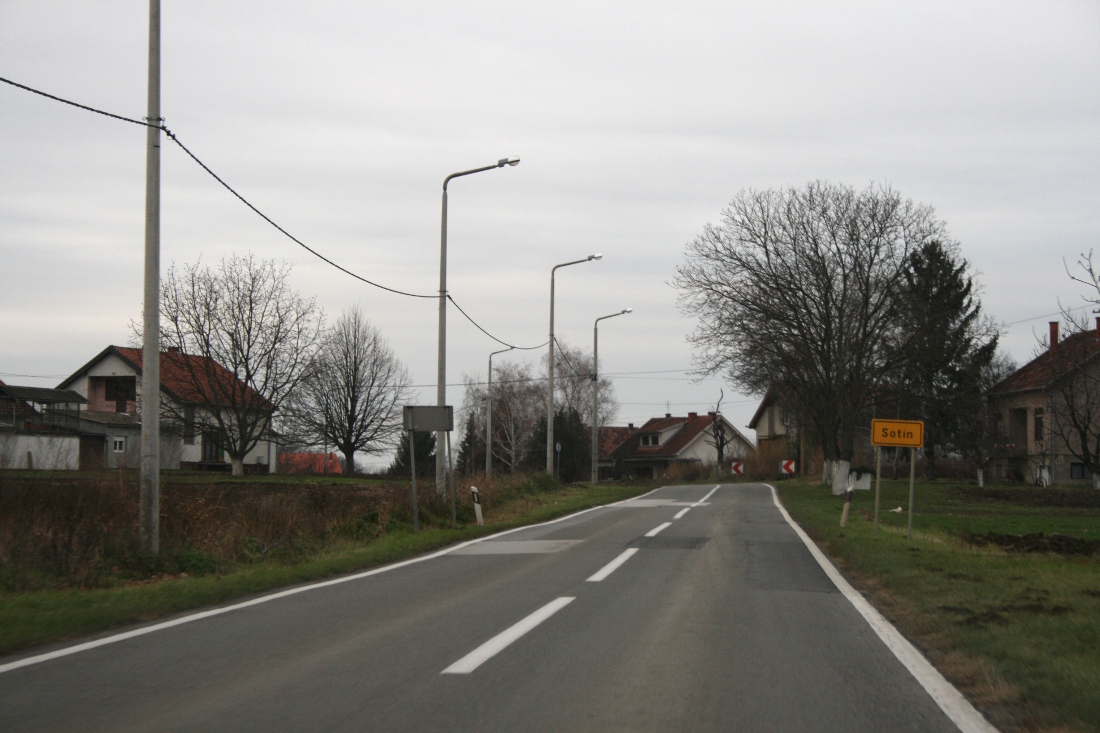
Sotin, on the D2 road route

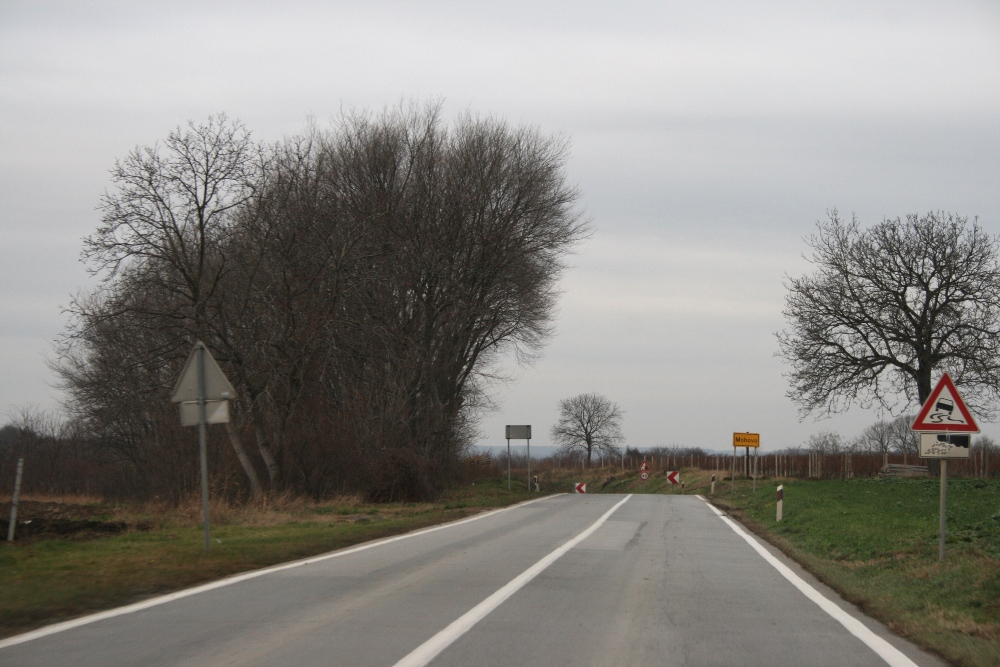
Mohovo, on the D2 road route

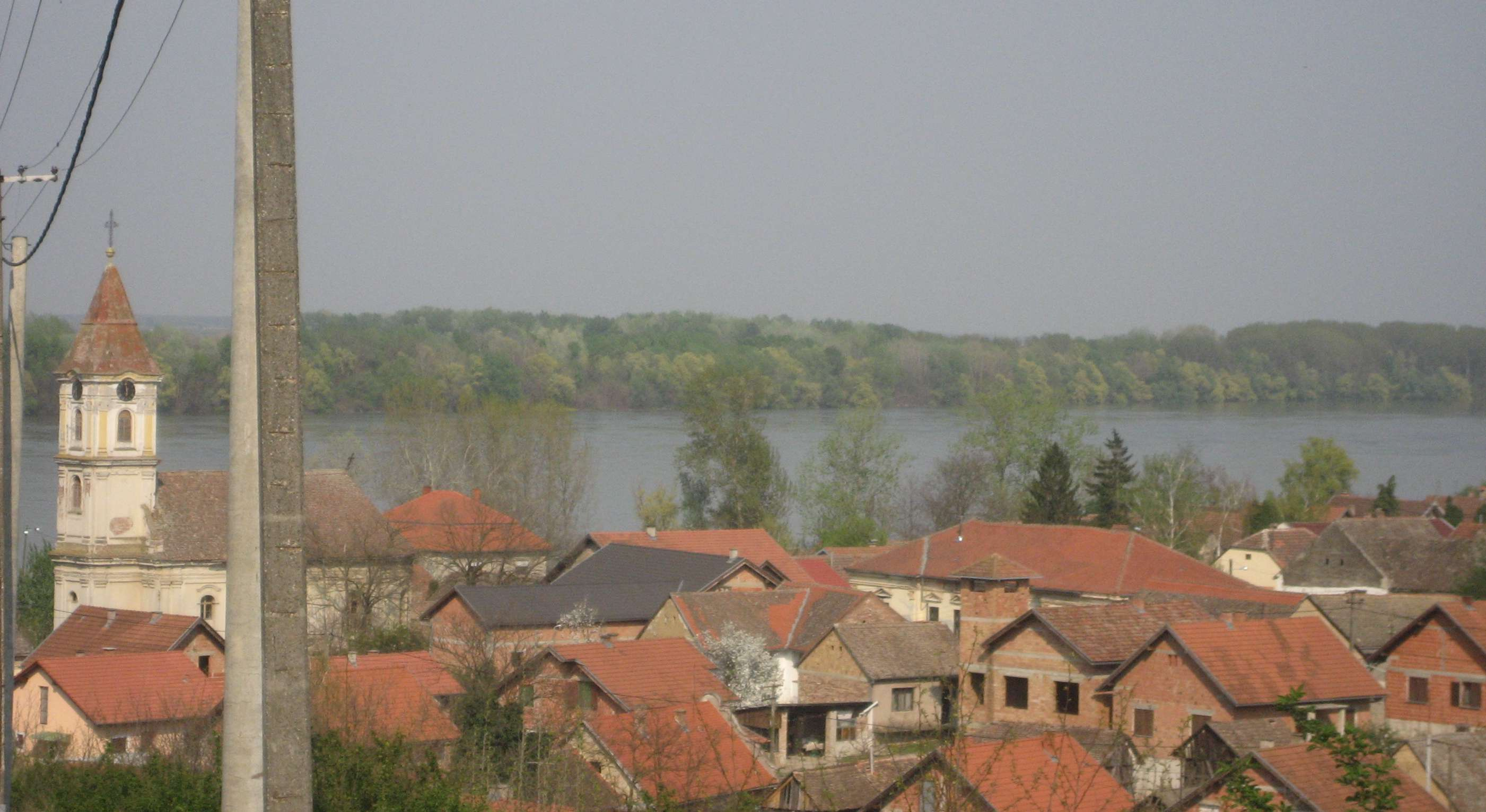
Šarengrad, on the D2 road route

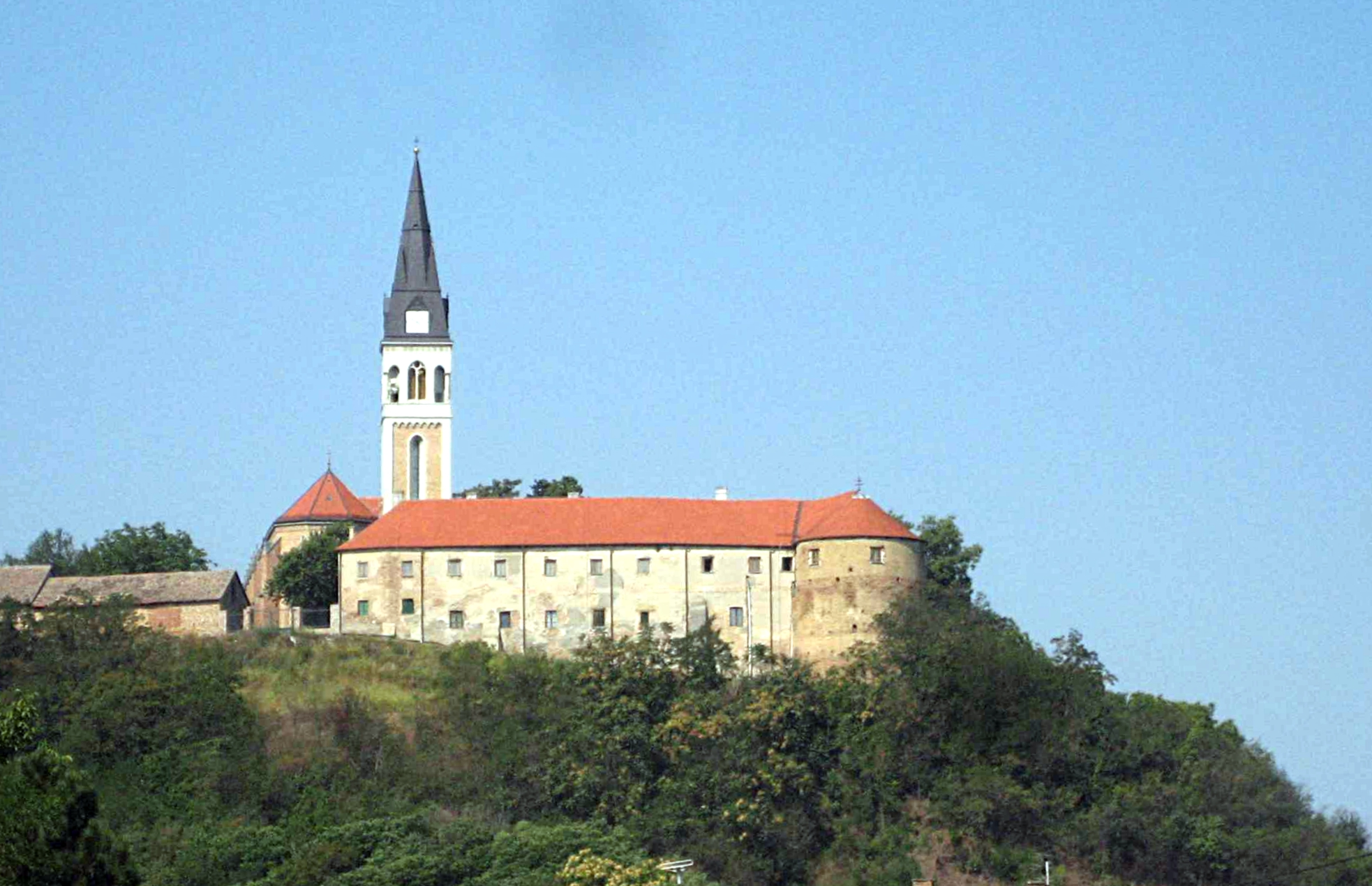
Ilok, at the eastern terminus of the D2 road

D2 state road (Croatian: Državna cesta D2) is a trunk state road in the northern areas of Croatia that spans from the border crossing with Slovenia at Dubrava Križovljanska in the west via Varaždin, Koprivnica, Virovitica, Našice, Osijek, Vukovar, ending at the Ilok–Bačka Palanka Bridge border crossing with Serbia. The road is 347.9 km (216.2 mi) long.

== Route description ==
Most of the D2 route runs parallel to the Drava River which is why it is often called the Drava River valley highway (Croatian: Podravska magistrala). However, east of Osijek as the Drava River flows into the Danube, the D2 road follows that river to its eastern terminus near Ilok. The D2 road connects either directly or via short connectors to the A4 and A5 motorways at Varaždin and Ludbreg (A4) and Osijek (A5) interchanges. The road is also parallel to the A3 motorway further to the south. As it does not reach the capital Zagreb nor shares designation with any of the major Pan-European corridors, it carries a more moderate volume of passenger and freight traffic, but it is still often used as an alternative to the tolled motorway. Two further connections of the D2 state road to Croatian motorway network were planned: to the A12 and A13 motorways near Koprivnica and Virovitica respectively. However the Government of Croatia cancelled construction of the two motorways in June 2012.

Parts of the D2 state road are used as southern bypass of Varaždin and Osijek and those sections of the road are more recently built than most of the route, as the D2 originally ran through the two cities. As of 2007 there were plans to upgrade the Osijek southern bypass to an expressway by construction of an additional carriageway, especially since all junctions along the section are already grade separated. In September 2011, the expansion construction works were formally opened: The works are scheduled to be completed in 30 months and they comprise an additional 12.1-kilometre (7.5 mi) carriageway, adaptation of the existing interchanges and construction of a new interchange along the section. The works comprise the D2 section between interchanges with the A5 motorway and the Ž4091 road.

Most of the D2 road also runs parallel to railway tracks. Currently, the only part of the D2 road that has been upgraded to expressway standards is the Osijek southern bypass between Josipovac and Tenjska interchanges.

The road, as well as all other state roads in Croatia, is managed and maintained by Hrvatske ceste, a state-owned company.

== Traffic volume ==
Traffic is regularly counted and reported by Hrvatske Ceste, operator of the road. The most significant traffic volumes are recorded near Varaždin and Osijek as the D2 road serves as their southern bypass.

D2 traffic volume
Road	Counting site	AADT	ASDT	Notes
D2	1203 Dubrava Križovljanska	2,296	2,705	Adjacent to Dubrava Križovljanska border crossing. The AADT figure estimated by Hrvatske ceste.
D2	1208 Majerje	7,565	7,902	Between the Ž2046 and Ž2037 junctions.
D2	1235 Hraščica	3,072	3,366	Between the Ž2252 and D35 junctions.
D2	1210 Varaždin - south	13,669	14,594	Between the Ž2068 and D3 junctions.
D2	1209 Šemovec	4,199	4,429	Adjacent to the Ž2054 junction.
D2	1307 Ludbreg - west	6,068	6,132	Adjacent to the Ž2075 junction.
D2	1308 Ludbreg - east	5,312	5,593	Adjacent to the D24 junction.
D2	1312 Plavšinac	5,037	5,087	Adjacent to the L26034 junction.
D2	1403 Đurđevac	5,888	6,013	Adjacent to the Ž2247 junction.
D2	2201 Kloštar	5,078	5,363	Adjacent to the Ž2185 junction.
D2	2203 Virovitica	7,556	7,856	Adjacent to the Ž4024 junction.
D2	2302 Cabuna	4,428	4,618	Adjacent to the L40034 junction.
D2	2307 Slatina - bypass	2,965	3,131	Between the Ž4025 and D34 junctions.
D2	2305 Čačinci - south	2,962	3,170	Between the Ž4063 and D314 junctions.
D2	2408 Feričanci - east	3,599	4,114	Between the Ž4058 and Ž4075 junctions.
D2	2407 Našice	3,831	4,035	Adjacent to the L44044 junction.
D2	2406 Bizovac - west	4,985	5,170	Between the Ž4067 and Ž4060 junctions.
D2	2508 Osijek southern bypass	19,206	19,093	Between the D7 and D518 junctions.
D2	3701 Klisa airport - north	4,617	4,664	Adjacent to D418 junction. Estimated by Hrvatske ceste.
D2	3723 Vukovar	11,076	11,530	Between the D55 and D57 junctions.
D2	3801 Sotin	3,532	3,857	Adjacent to the Ž4152 junction.
D2	3803 Ilok - west	886	993	Between the Ž4199 and Ž4200 junctions.

== Road junctions and populated areas ==
D2 junctions/populated areas
Type	Slip roads/Notes
	Dubrava Križovljanska border crossing to Slovenia. Slovenian route 228 to Ptuj, Slovenia. The western terminus of the road.
	Dubrava Križovljanska
	Veliki Lovrečan; Ž2027 to Donja Voća.
	Brezje Dravsko; Ž2028 to Otok Virje.
	Babinec
	Cestica
	Križovljan Radovečki; Ž2035 to Natkrižovljan.
	Gornje Vratno
	Ž2029 to Vratno Otok (to the north) and Vinica and Biljevec (to the south).
	Petrijanec; Ž2036 to Družbinec and Strmec Podravski.
	Majerje; Ž2046 to Nova Ves Petrijanečka.
	Sračinec; Ž2037 to Svibovec Podravski.
	Hrašćica
	To Varaždin via Optujska Street. The westernmost intersection of the Varaždin bypass.
	D35 to Lepoglava and Sveti Križ Začretje (D1). To Varaždin via Braće Radić Street.
	Ž2050 to Beretinec, Sveti Ilija and Novi Marof.
	D3 to Novi Marof (to the south). Start of the D3 concurrency. D528 to the A4 motorway Varaždin interchange. The southern terminus of the double carriage road.
	To Varaždin via Gospodarska Street. The northern terminus of the double carriage road.
	To Varaždin via Vilka Novaka Street.
	D3 to Čakovec (to the north). End of the D3 concurrency. The easternmost intersection of the Varaždin bypass.
	Trnovec Bartolovečki; Ž2053 to Zbelava.
	Bartolovec
	Štefanec
	Šemovec; Ž2022 to Orehovica, Mala Subotica and Belica. Ž2054 to Jalžabet, Grešćevina and Tuhovec (D24).
	Zamlaka; Ž2071 to Čičkovina, Hrženica and Ludbreg.
	D530 to the A4 motorway Ludbreg interchange.
	Vrbanovec; Ž2052 to Jalžabet and Kelemen.
	Sudovčina
	Martijanec
	Križovljan; Ž2074 to D24 state road.
	Poljanec; D24 to Varaždinske Toplice and Novi Marof.
	Ludbreg; Ž2071 to Hrženica and Čičkovina. Ž2075 within the town.
	Sigetec Ludbreški; Ž2076 to Slokovec, Mali Bukovec and Selnica Podravska.
	Ludbreg; Ž2075 within the town. Ž2262 to Hrastovsko (D24).
	Globočec Ludbreški
	Čukovec
	Bolfan
	Cvetkovec
	Ž2081 to Kuzminec and Zablatje (to the north) and to Rasinja and Veliki Poganac (to the south).
	Subotica Podravska
	Kunovec Breg
	Koprivnica; D20 to Đelekovec, Prelog and Čakovec (D3). D41 to Križevci and D10 expressway Vrbovec 1 interchange (to the south) and to Gola border crossing to Hungary (to the north).
	Štaglinec
	Glogovac; Ž2149 to Koprivnički Bregi.
	Borovljani
	Vlaislav
	Novigrad Podravski; Ž2150 to Delovi. Ž2182 to Donji Mosti and Kapela.
	Virje; D210 to Molve, Ždala and Gola (D41). Ž2183 to Šemovci (D43). Ž2236 to Miholjanec, Donje Zdjelice, Babotok and the D43 state road.
	Đurđevac; D43 to Bjelovar, Čazma and A3 motorway Ivanić Grad interchange. Ž2213 to Budrovac and Sirova Katalena. Ž2247 within the town.
	Budančevica; Ž2232 to Suha Katalena, Šandrovac and Bulinac (D28).
	Kloštar Podravski; Ž2185 to Ferdinandovac and Novo Virje. Ž2234 to Dinjevac and Grabrovnica.
	Pitomača; Ž4001 to Dinjevac. Ž4002 to Velika Črešnjevica, Velika Pisanica and the D28 state road.
	Stari Gradac
	Ž4007 to Rogovac, Lukač and Gradina.
	Lozan; Ž4006 to Turnašica and Velika Črešnjevica.
	Špišić Bukovica; Ž4008 to Bušetina. Ž4242 to Topolovica and Mali Grđevac.
	Korija
	D5 to Terezino Polje border crossing to Hungary (to the north) and to Daruvar, Pakrac and to the A3 motorway Okučani interchange (to the south).
	Virovitica
	Čemernica
	Suhopolje; Ž4024 to Novaki, Sopje and Čađavica (D34).
	Ž3301 to Donji Daruvar (D5).
	Jugovo Polje
	Cabuna
	Bistrica
	Donji Meljani
	Ž3301 to Donji Daruvar (D5).
	Slatina; D34 to Donji Miholjac. D69 to Voćin and Kamenska (D38). Ž4025 to Bakić, Gornji Miholjac and Novaki. Ž4296 within the town.
	Kozice
	Nova Bukovica; Ž4045 to Miljevci and Crnac.
	Bukovački Antunovac
	Mikleuš; Ž4038 to Čađavica (D34) (to the north) and to Četekovac (to the south).
	Ž4069 to Humljani and Slatinski Drenovac.
	Čačinci; Ž4062 to Bukvik.
	D314 to Orahovica.
	Orahovica; Ž4030 to Moslavački Krčenik and Zdenci (to the north) and to Kutjevo and Pleternica D38 (to the south). Ž4072 to Dolci.
	Feričanci; Ž4058 to Bokšić and the D53 state road.
	Ž4075 to Vučjak Feričanački, Đurđenovac and Pribiševci.
	Donja Motičina
	Ž4104 to Seona.
	Martin; D53 to Slavonski Brod (to the south). The D2 and D53 roads are concurrent to the east of this junction.
	Našice; D53 to Donji Miholjac (to the north). The D2 and D53 roads are concurrent to the west of this junction. Ž4077 to Brezik Našički and Ličko Novo Selo.
	Markovac Našički; Ž4297 to Ž4168 county road.
	D515 to Đakovo (D7).
	Jelisavac; Ž4078 to Lađanska and Lila.
	Breznica Našička
	Niza
	Ž4079 to Ledenik.
	Koška; Ž4031 to Šljivoševci, Viljevo and the D34 state road. Ž4052 to Harkanovci and Valpovo; Ž4079 to Ledenik; Ž4080 to Budimci. Ž4237 to Ordanja and Andrijevac.
	Normanci
	Topoline
	Cret Bizovački
	Bizovac; Ž4060 to Ladimirevci. Ž4067 to Brođanci and Čepinski Martinci.
	Samatovci
	D34 to Donji Miholjac (to the north). To Josipovac via Bizovačka Street (to the east). The westernmost interchange of the southern Osijek bypass.
	Josipovac interchange A5 Osijek interchange to Đakovo and the A3 motorway Sredanci interchange. Start of the E 73 concurrency (the E 73 comes from the A5 motorway to the west via short connector). The western terminus of dual carriageway expressway.
	Retfala interchange D7 to Beli Manastir (to the north) and Đakovo (to the south). End of the E 73 concurrency (the E 73 goes to the north onto the D7 road). To Osijek via Svilajska Street (to the north and south).
	Čepinska interchange To Osijek via Svetog Leopolda Bogdana Mandića Street.
	Vinkovačka interchange To Osijek via Vinkovačka Street (to the north). To Brijest (D518) via Vinkovačka Street (to the south).
	Trpimirova interchange D518 to Vinkovci (to the south). To Osijek via Kneza Trpimira Street (to the north).
	Tenjska interchange To Osijek via Kralja Petra Svačića Street (to the north). To Tenja via Tenjska Road (to the south). The eastern terminus of dual carriageway expressway.
	Elektroslavonija interchange To Osijek (to the north).
	Nemetin interchange D213 to Erdut (to the east). D417 to Port of Osijek (to the north).
	D418 to Osijek Airport.
	Klisa
	Ž4111 to Vera (to the north) and to Bobota and Pačetin (to the south).
	Trpinja
	Borovo Naselje; D55 to Vinkovci and the A3 motorway Županja interchange. D519 to Dalj (D213).
	Vukovar; D57 to Orolik, Nijemci and the A3 motorway Lipovac interchange.
	Sotin
	Opatovac; Ž4174 to Lovas.
	Mohovo.
	Šarengrad; Ž4198 to Bapska and Lovas.
	Ilok; Ž4200 within the town. Ž4199 to Principovac border crossing to Šid, Serbia (Serbian route 121).
	Ilok–Bačka Palanka Bridge, border crossing to Serbia. Serbian route 108 to Bačka Palanka, Vojvodina, Serbia. The eastern terminus of the road.
