= Slatina, Croatia =

Slatina
- Town
- Grad Slatina; Town of Slatina
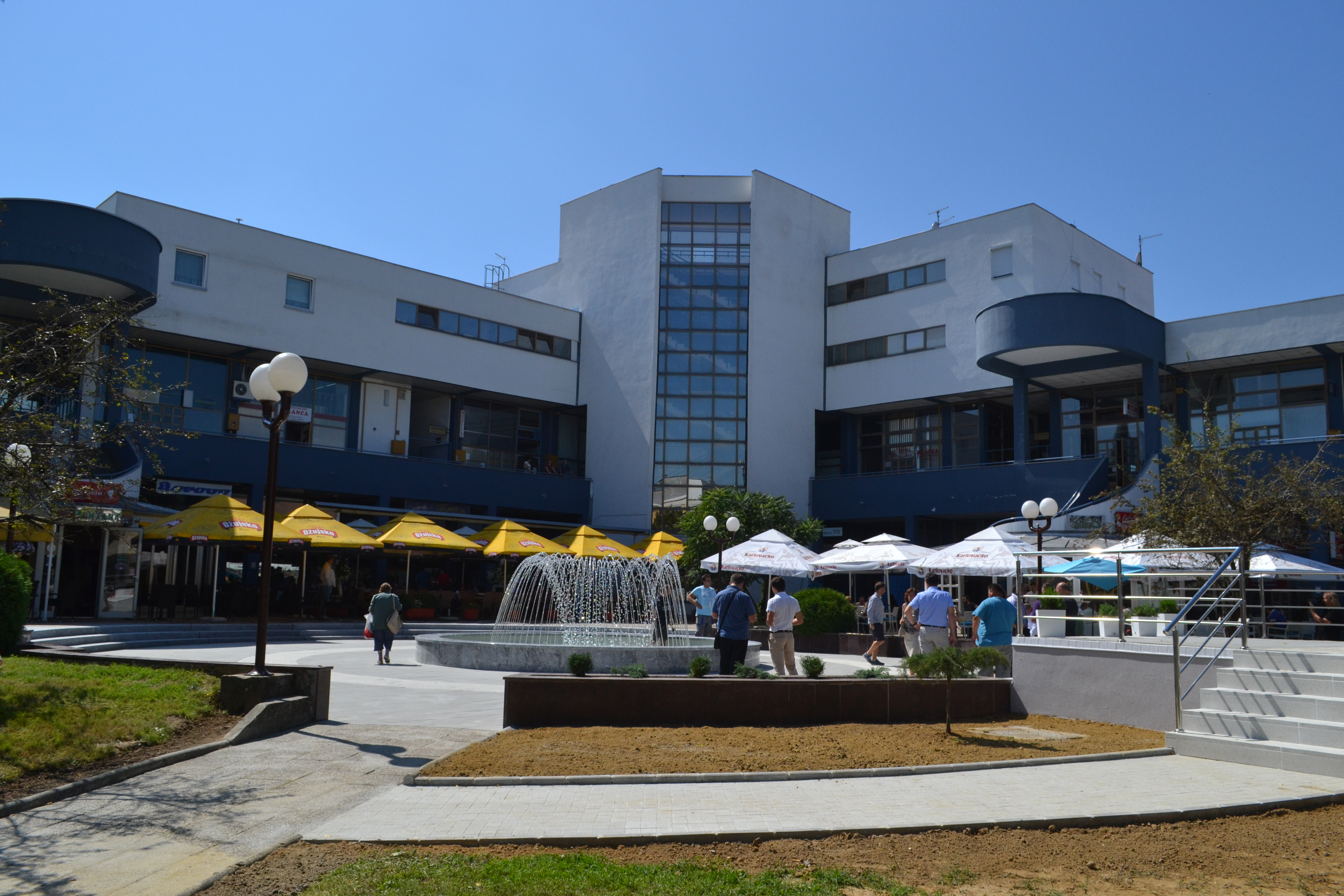
- Main square "Trg svetog Josipa"
- Interactive map of Slatina
- Location of Slatina in Croatia
- Coordinates: 45°42′08″N 17°42′04″E
- Country: Croatia
- Region: Slavonia (Podravina)
- County: Virovitica-Podravina County

Government
  - Mayor: Tomo Tomić (HDZ)

Area
  - Town: 167.8 km^{2} (64.8 sq mi)
  - Urban: 47.3 km^{2} (18.3 sq mi)

Population (2021)
  - Town: 11,503
  - Density: 68.55/km^{2} (177.5/sq mi)
  - Urban: 8,722
  - Urban density: 184/km^{2} (478/sq mi)
- Time zone: UTC+1 (Central European Time)
- Website: slatina.hr

Slatina is a town in the Slavonia region of Croatia. It is located in the Virovitica-Podravina County, at the contact of the Drava valley and the foothills of Papuk mountain, in the central part of the region of Podravina, 29 km (18 mi) southeast of Virovitica; elevation 127 metres (417 feet). It was ruled by Ottoman Empire between 1542 and 1687, when it was captured by Austrian troops. During Ottoman rule, it was initially part of Sanjak of Pojega between 1542 and 1601, latterly part of Sanjak of Rahoviçe between 1601 and 1687. It was district centre at Virovitica County in Kingdom of Croatia-Slavonia between 1868 and 1918.

"Slatina" means "salt lake" in Croatian. However, there is no salt lake there any more.

== Demographics ==
The population of the town is 10,152 (2011), with a total of 13,609 in the municipality, composed of the following settlements:

- Bakić, population 537
- Bistrica, population 165
- Donji Meljani, population 259
- Golenić, population 22
- Gornji Miholjac, population 304
- Ivanbrijeg, population 30
- Kozice, population 511
- Lukavac, population 99
- Markovo, population 131
- Medinci, population 200
- Novi Senkovac, population 301
- Radosavci, population 99
- Sladojevački Lug, population 90
- Sladojevci, population 730
- Slatina, population 10,208

In 2001, 85.5% of the population were Croats. In 2011, there were 88.35% Croats, 9.16% Serbs, and 2.49% others.

Town of Slatina: Population trends 1857–2021
v

population	5464	6625	6548	8372	9188	10201	10290	11929	11805	12509	12598	13475	14638	15844	14819	13686	11503
	1857	1869	1880	1890	1900	1910	1921	1931	1948	1953	1961	1971	1981	1991	2001	2011	2021

Sources: Croatian Bureau of Statistics publications

== Climate ==
Since records began in 1981, the highest temperature recorded at the local weather station was 39.6 °C (103.3 °F), on 20 July 2017. The coldest temperature was −24.2 °C (−11.6 °F), on 13 January 2003.

== Politics ==
=== Minority councils ===
Directly elected minority councils and representatives are tasked with consulting tasks for the local or regional authorities in which they are advocating for minority rights and interests, integration into public life and participation in the management of local affairs. At the 2023 Croatian national minorities councils and representatives elections Serbs of Croatia fulfilled legal requirements to elect 15 members minority councils of the Town of Slatina.
