= D314 road =

Road in Croatia

D314 state road

Route information
- Length: 2.9 km (1.8 mi)

Major junctions
- From: D2 near Orahovica
- To: Orahovica

Location
- Country: Croatia
- Counties: Virovitica-Podravina

Highway system
- Highways in Croatia

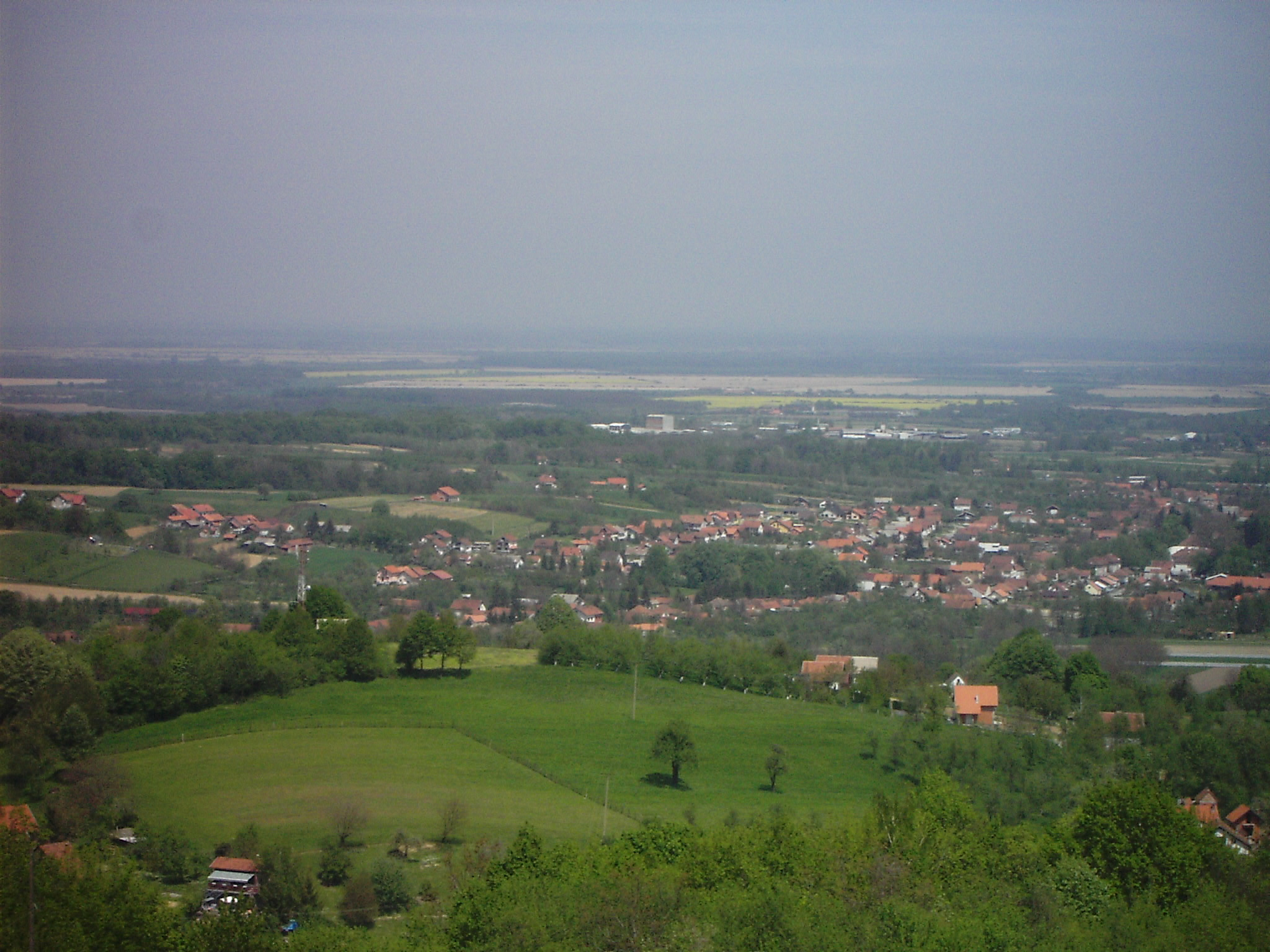
Orahovica, at the southern terminus of the D314 road

D314 branches off to the south from D2 between Čačinci and Feričanci towards the city of Orahovica in Croatia. The road is 2.9 km (1.8 mi) long.

Like all state roads in Croatia, the D314 is also managed and maintained by Hrvatske ceste, state owned company.

== Road junctions and populated areas ==
D417 junctions/populated areas
Type	Slip roads/Notes
	D2 to Slatina and Virovitica (to the west) and to Našice and Osijek (to the east). The northern terminus of the road.
	Orahovica; Ž4070 to the Ž4030 within the city and then via the Ž4030 Zdenci and to Kutjevo and Pleternica (D38). The southern terminus of the road.
