= D528 road =

Road in Croatia

D528 state road

Route information
- Length: 2.4 km (1.5 mi)

Major junctions
- From: D3 near Varaždin
- D2 near Varaždin
- To: A4 in Varaždin interchange

Location
- Country: Croatia
- Counties: Varaždin
- Major cities: Varaždin

Highway system
- Highways in Croatia

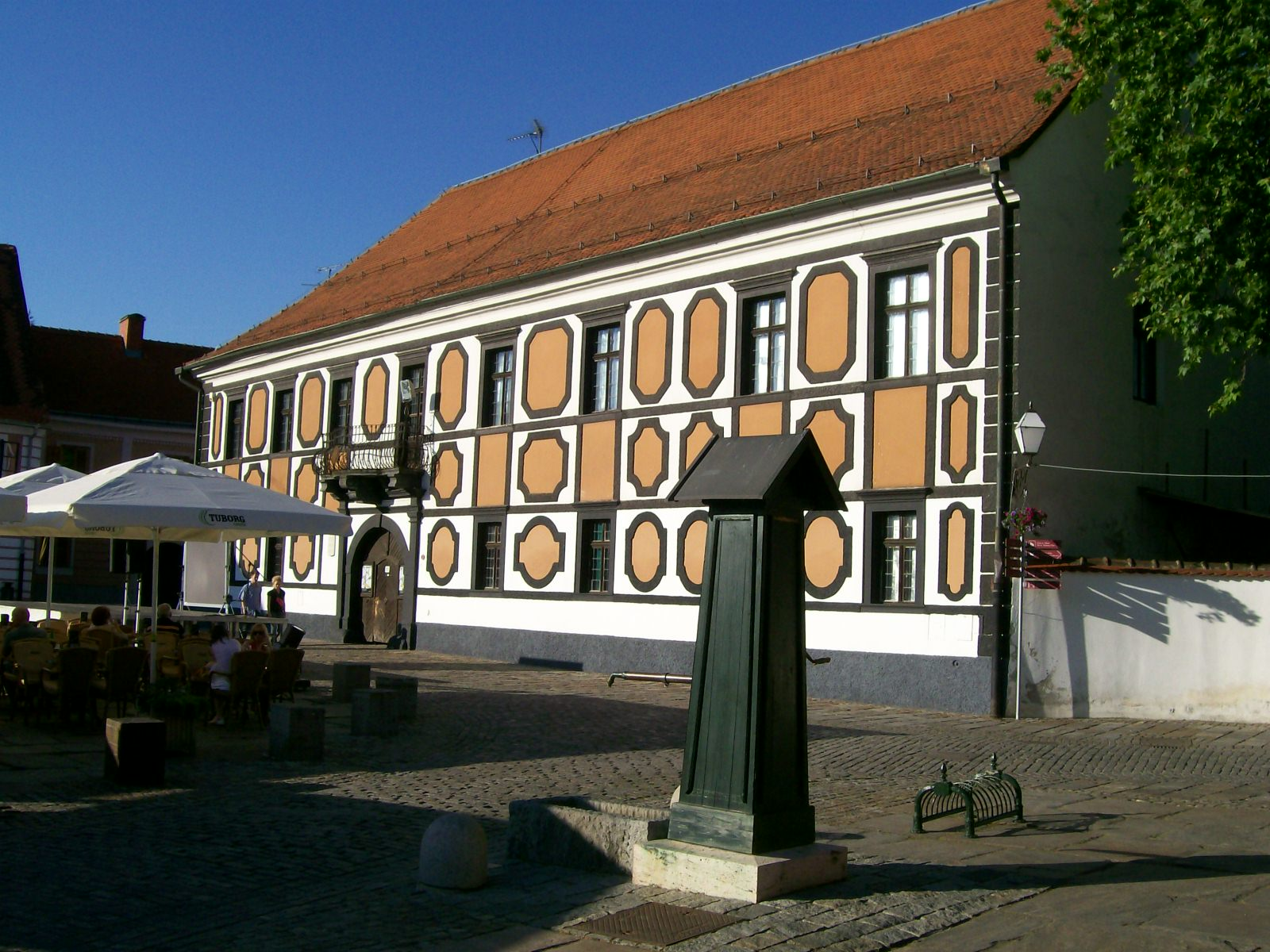
Varaždin, near the western terminus of the D528

D528 connects the A4 motorway Varaždin interchange to the D2 and D3 state roads, just to the south of the city of Varaždin. The eastern terminus of the road is an intersection with the D2 and D3 state roads, which are concurrent at that location. The road is 2.4 km (1.5 mi) long.

The D528 and all other state roads in Croatia are managed and maintained by Hrvatske ceste, state owned company.

== Traffic volume ==
The D528 state road traffic volume is not reported by Hrvatske ceste. However, they regularly count and report traffic volume on the A4 motorway Varaždin interchange, which connects to the D528 road only, thus permitting the D528 road traffic volume to be accurately calculated. The report includes no information on ASDT volumes.

D528 traffic volume
Road	Counting site	AADT	ASDT	Notes
A4	Varaždin interchange	354	n/a	Southbound A4 traffic leaving the motorway at the interchange.
A4	Varaždin interchange	2,681	n/a	Southbound A4 traffic entering the motorway at the interchange.
A4	Varaždin interchange	2,638	n/a	Northbound A4 traffic leaving the motorway at the interchange.
A4	Varaždin interchange	354	n/a	Northbound A4 traffic entering the motorway at the interchange.
D528	Varaždin interchange	6,027	n/a	Total traffic entering/leaving the A4 motorway from/to D528.

== Road junctions and populated areas ==
D528 junctions/populated areas
Type	Slip roads/Notes
	D2 to Nedeljanec (D35) and Dubrava Križovljanska border crossing to Slovenia (to the west) and Varaždin (to the north). D3 to Novi Marof (D22) and Breznički Hum (to the south) and Varaždin (to the north). The D2 and D3 roads are concurrent to the north of the intersection. The western terminus of the road.
	Ž2070 to Donji Kneginec and Gornji Kneginec.
	A4 in Varaždin interchange, to Zagreb (to the south) and to Čakovec (to the north). The eastern terminus of the road.

== See also ==
- A4 motorway
