= Miljevci =

Miljevci may refer to:

- Miljevci, Dalmatia, a region near Drniš, Croatia
- Miljevci (Bar Municipality), a village in Montenegro
- Miljevci, Virovitica–Podravina County, a village near Nova Bukovica
- Miljevci, Bosnia and Herzegovina, a village near Sanski Most
