= Neštin =

Neštin Нештин (Serbian) Neštin (Slovak)
- Village (Selo)
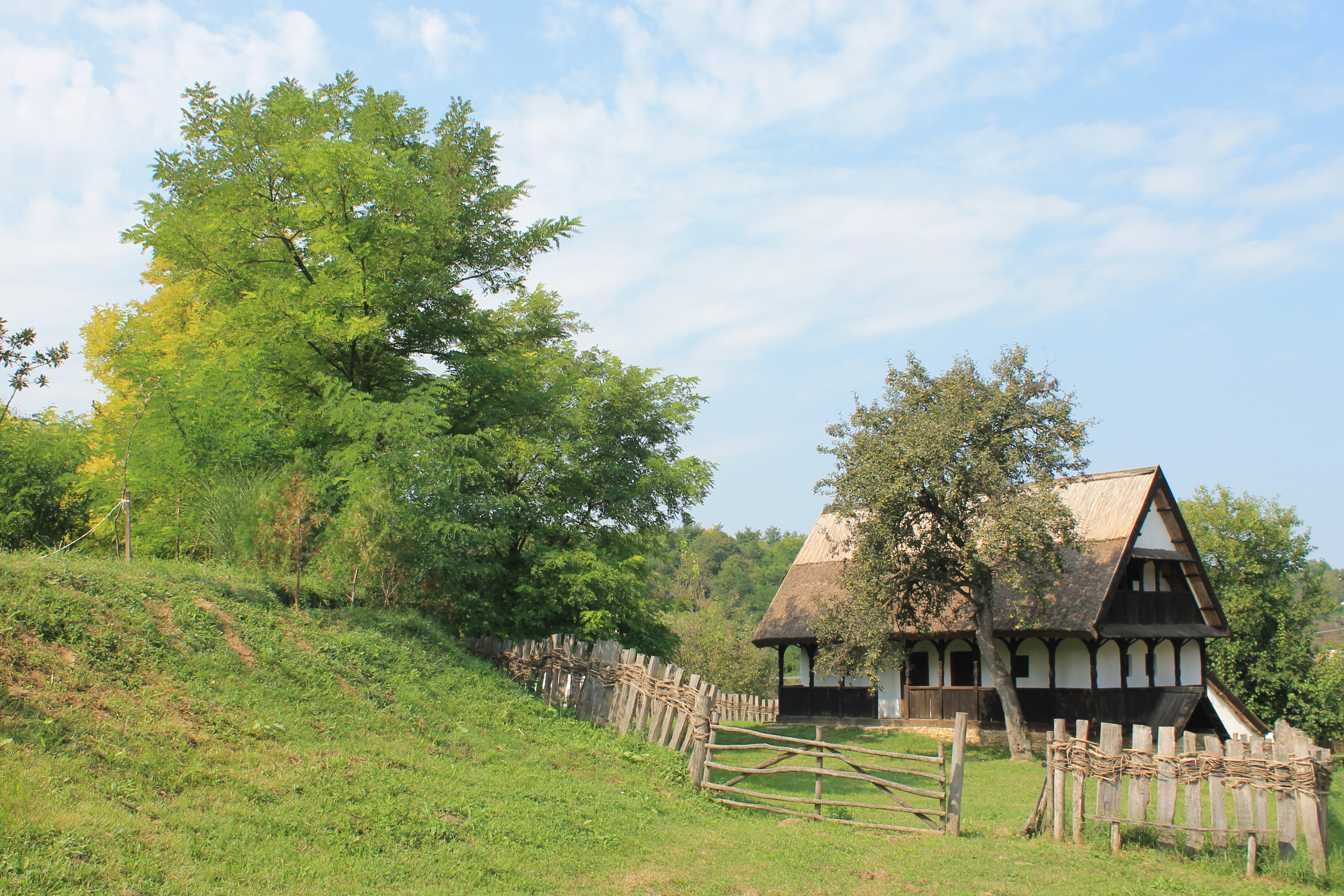
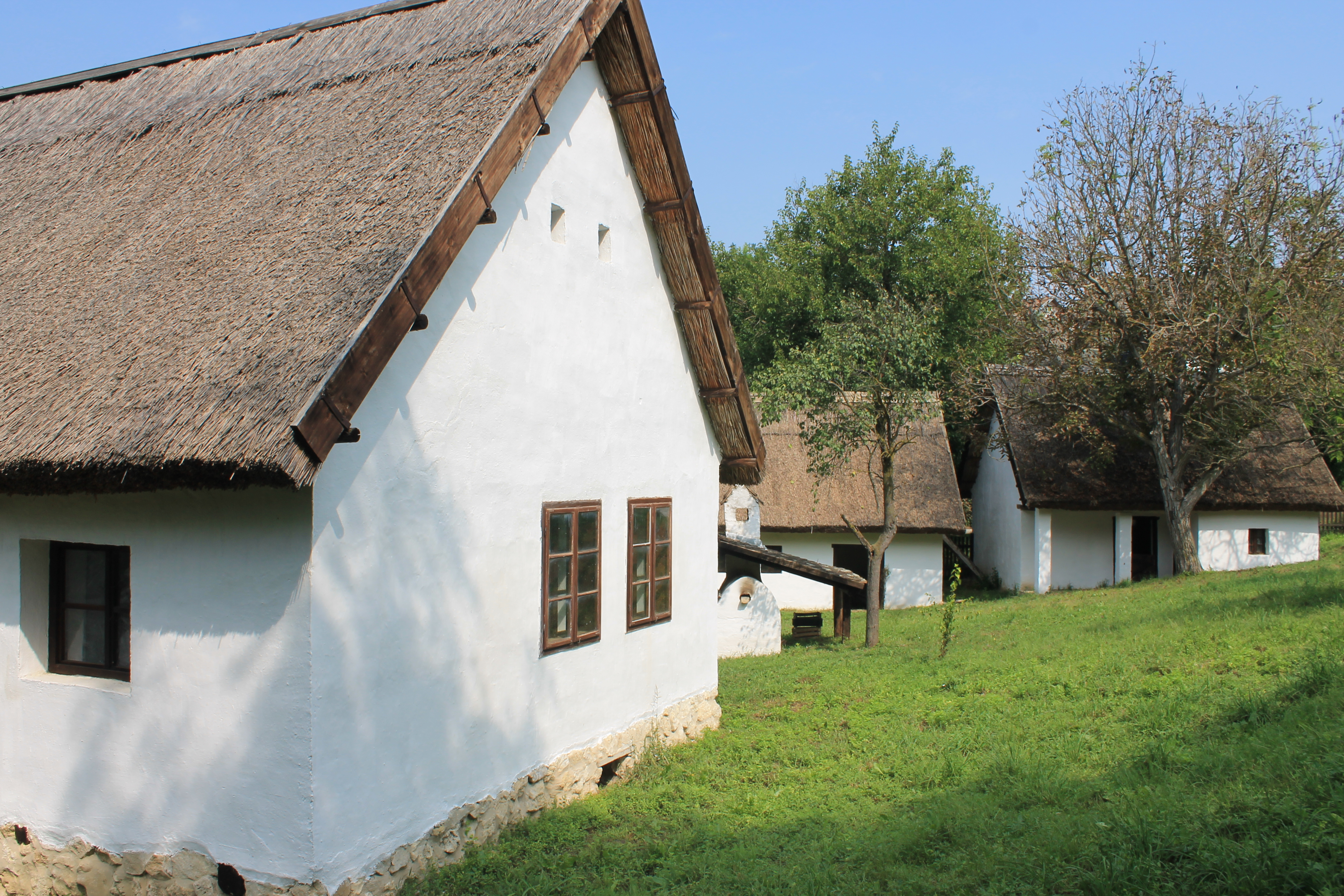
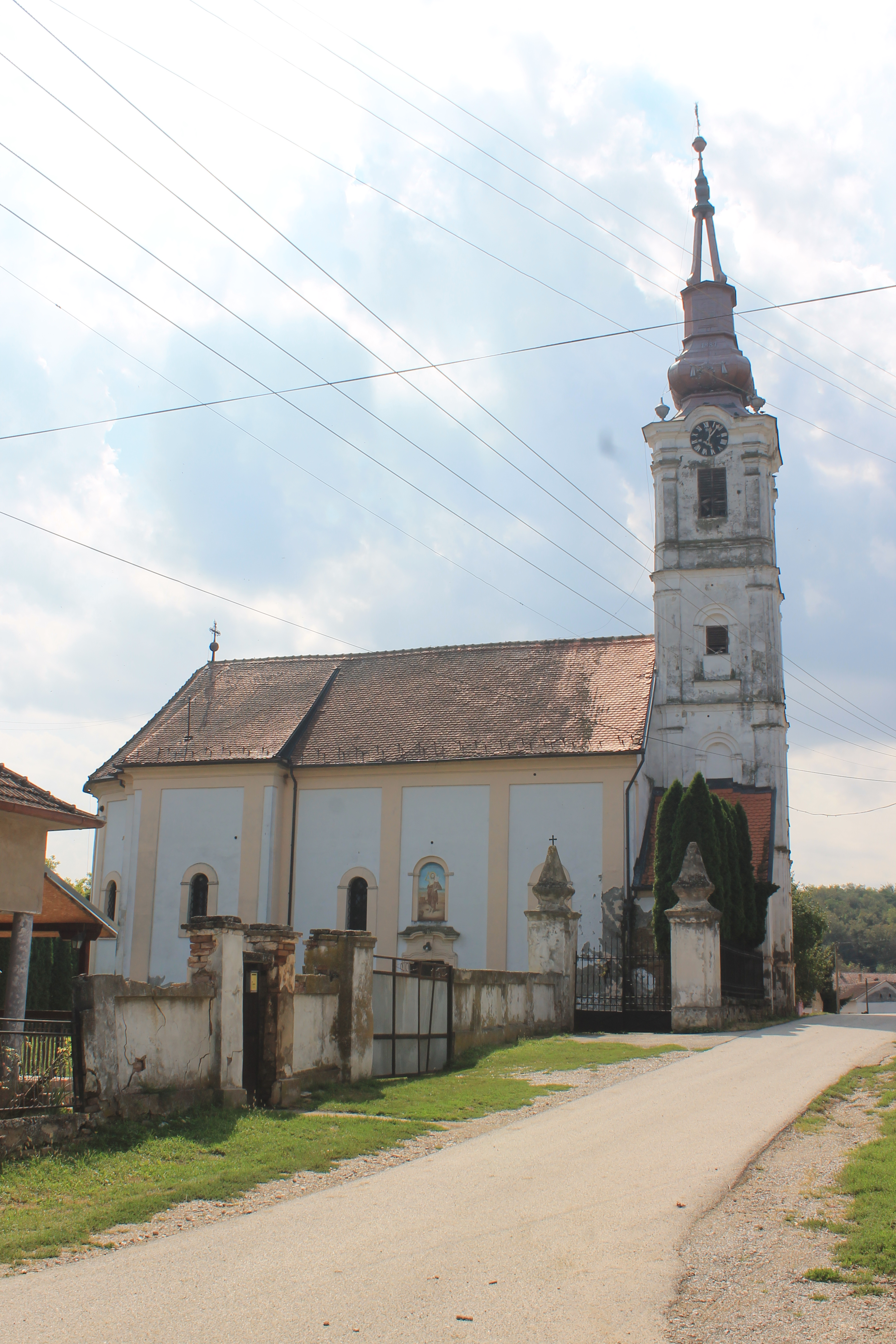
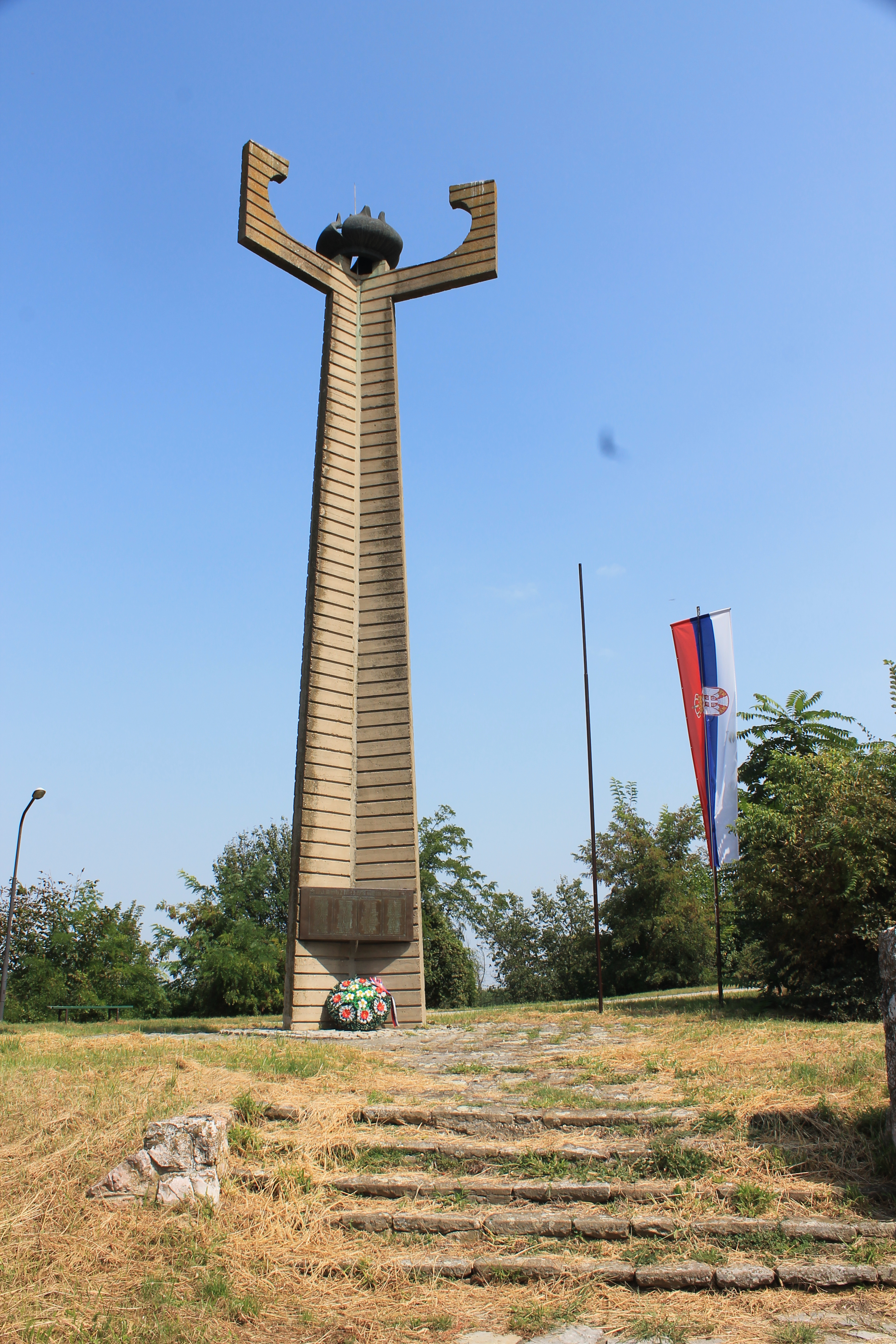
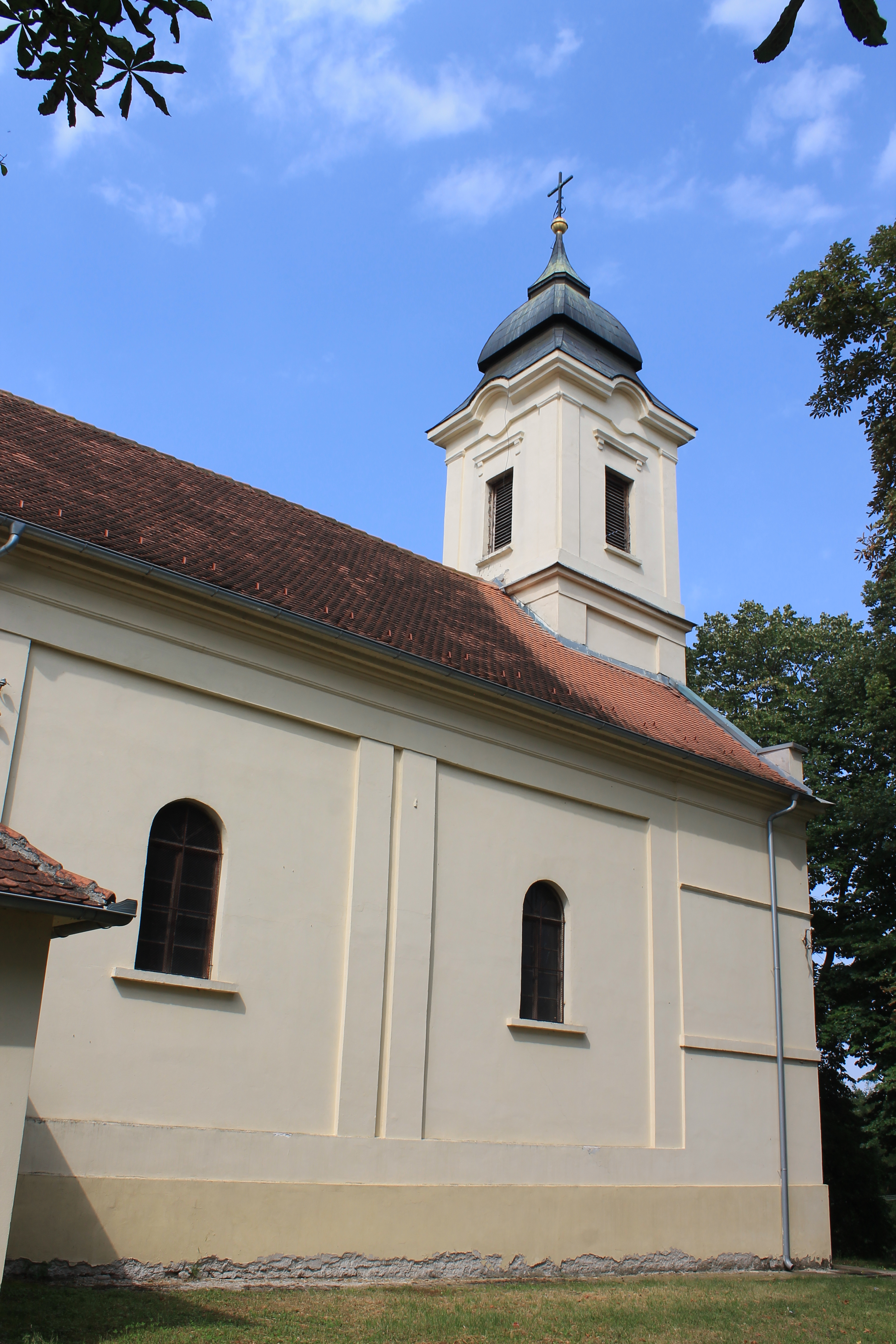
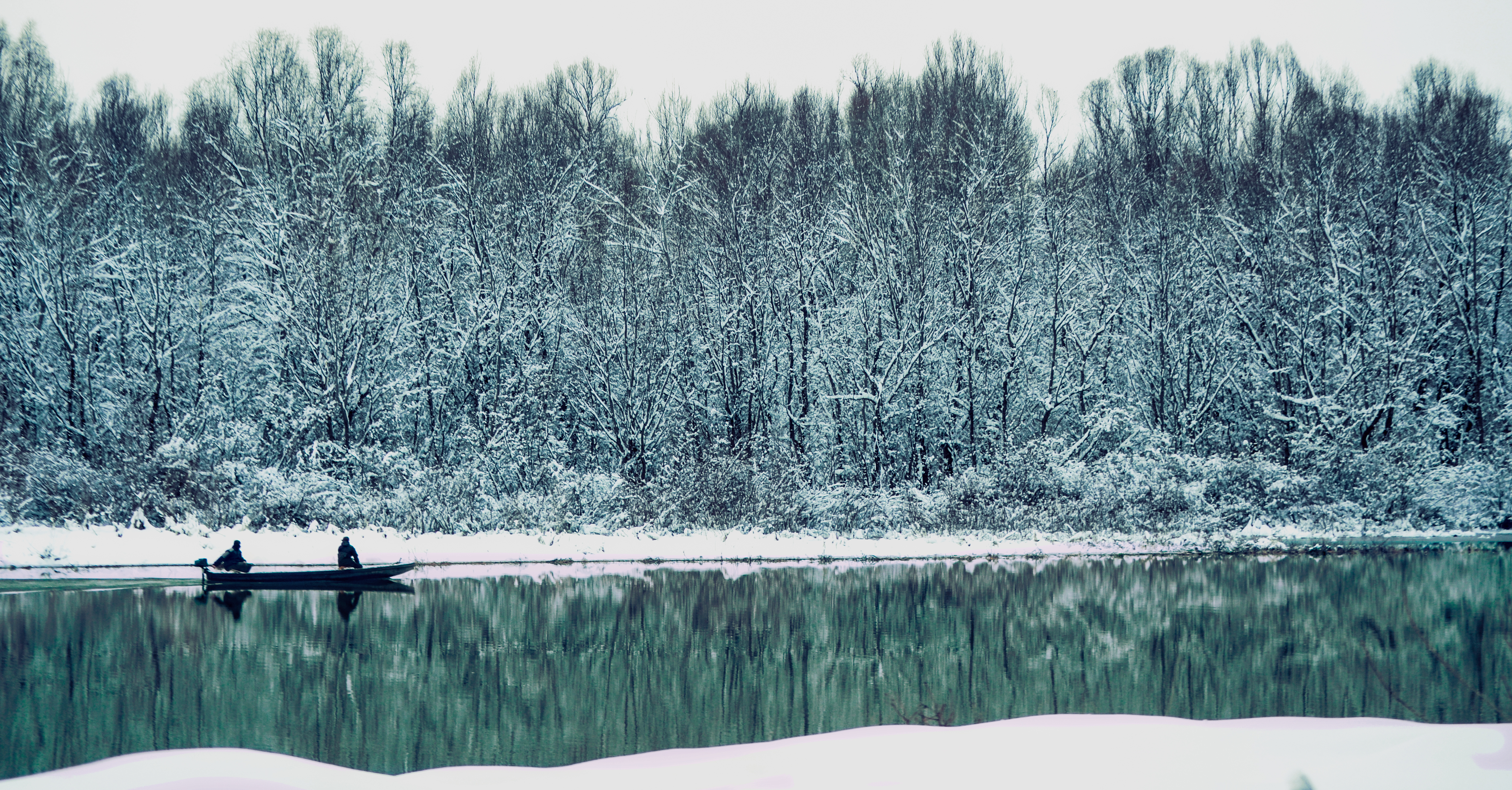
- Neštin
- Interactive map of Neštin
- Location within Vojvodina Location within Serbia Location within Europe
- Coordinates: 45.226°N 19.45°E
- Country: Serbia
- Province: Vojvodina
- Region: Syrmia (Podunavlje)
- District: South Bačka
- Municipality: Bačka Palanka

Area
  - Total: 33.8 km^{2} (13.1 sq mi)
- Elevation: 135 m (443 ft)

Population (2011)
  - Total: 794
  - Density: 23.5/km^{2} (60.8/sq mi)
- Time zone: UTC+1 (CET)
  - Summer (DST): UTC+2 (CEST)

Neštin (Serbian Cyrillic: Нештин) is a village located in the Bačka Palanka municipality, in the South Bačka District of the autonomous province of Vojvodina, Serbia. Geographically, it is located in the region of Syrmia. According to the 2011 census, the village has a population of 794 inhabitants. Also, wine produced in Neštin is well-known.

== Geography ==
Situated across the Danube from the municipality center, Neštin is a practical exclave, as the shortest road (9 km) linking it with Bačka Palanka (across the Ilok–Bačka Palanka Bridge) leads halfway through the territory of Croatia, and includes two border crossings. A tightened border regime owing to Croatia's accession to the European Union in 2013 has caused considerable inconvenience for the daily commuting of students and workers. Agriculture producers of Neštin were affected in particular, because transport of goods through Croatia was not permitted anymore without extensive paperwork.

== History ==
The 12-meter tall obelisk "Monument to Victims of Fascism 1941-45" designed by Jovan Soldatović is located in Neštin.

== Demographics ==
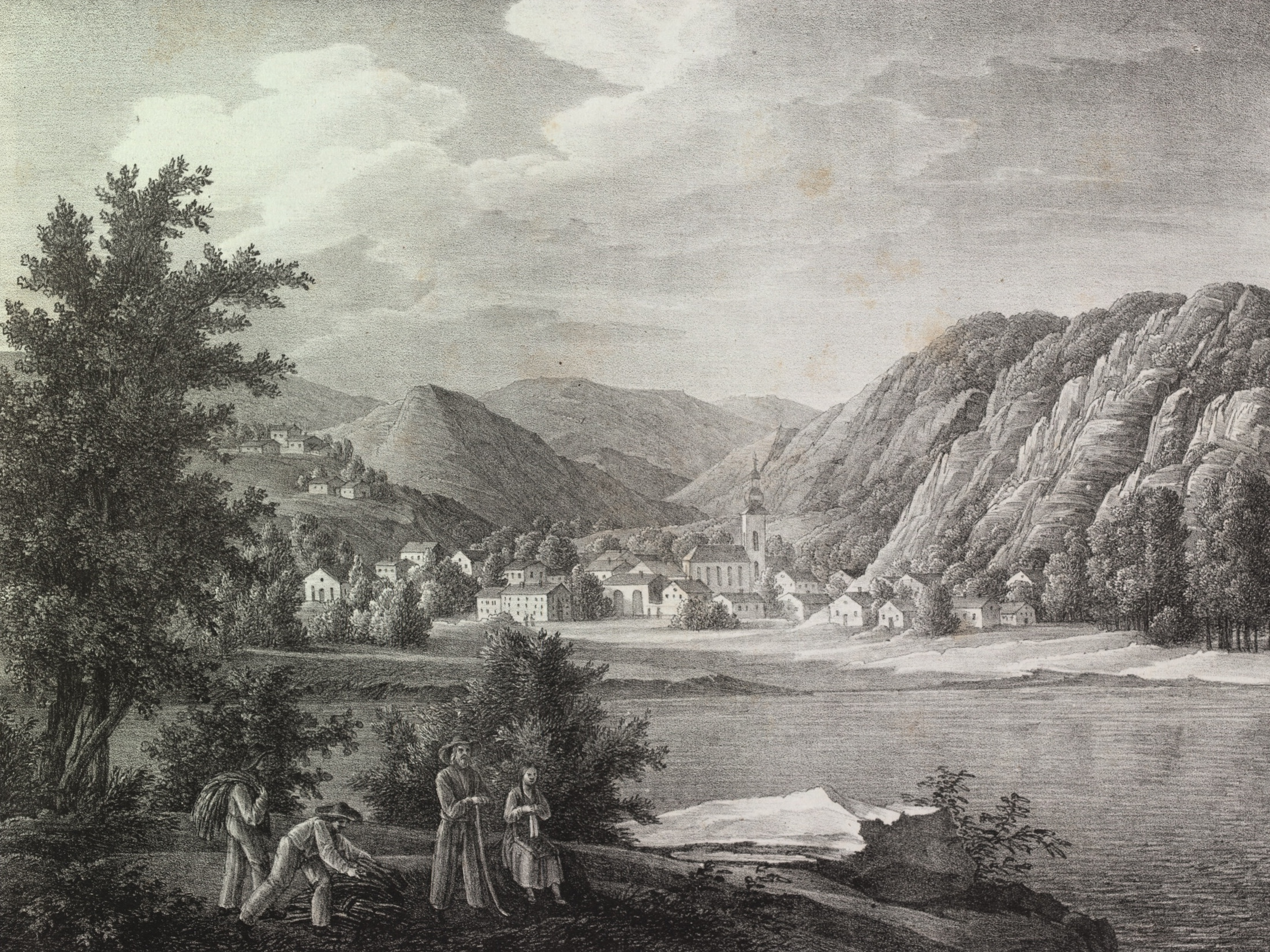
Neštin in 1826

Historical population
Year	Pop.	±% p.a.
1931	2,490	—
1948	1,120	−4.59%
1953	1,163	+0.76%
1961	1,217	+0.57%
1971	1,088	−1.11%
1981	1,043	−0.42%
1991	1,002	−0.40%
2002	900	−0.97%
2011	794	−1.38%

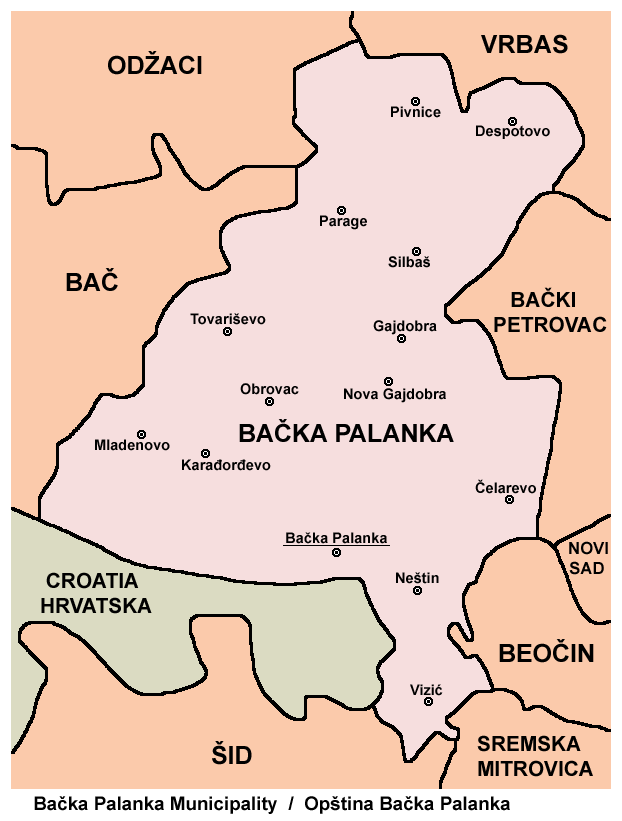
Map of the municipality of Bačka Palanka, showing the location of Neštin

According to the last official census done in 2011, the village of Neštin has 794 inhabitants.

== See also ==
- List of places in Serbia
- List of cities, towns and villages in Vojvodina
