= Subotica Podravska =

Coordinates: 46°11′N 16°45′E

- Village
- Interactive map of Subotica Podravska
- Country: Croatia
- County: Koprivnica-Križevci County

Area
  - Total: 3.0 sq mi (7.7 km^{2})

Population (2021)
  - Total: 471
  - Density: 160/sq mi (61/km^{2})
- Time zone: UTC+1 (CET)
  - Summer (DST): UTC+2 (CEST)

Subotica Podravska is a village in Croatia. It is connected by the D2 highway.
