= Nova Ves Petrijanečka =

Coordinates: 46°19′01″N 16°13′59″E

- Village
- Interactive map of Nova Ves Petrijanečka
- Country: Croatia
- County: Varaždin County

Area
  - Total: 9.6 km^{2} (3.7 sq mi)

Population (2021)
  - Total: 826
  - Density: 86/km^{2} (220/sq mi)
- Time zone: UTC+1 (CET)
  - Summer (DST): UTC+2 (CEST)

Nova Ves Petrijanečka is a village in Croatia. It is connected by the D2 highway.
