= Ilok–Bačka Palanka Bridge =

Bridge in Croatia and Serbia

Ilok–Bačka Palanka Bridge 25 May Bridge Мост '25. мај' (Serbian) or Мост Бачка Паланка-Илок (Serbian) Most Ilok-Bačka Palanka (Croatian)
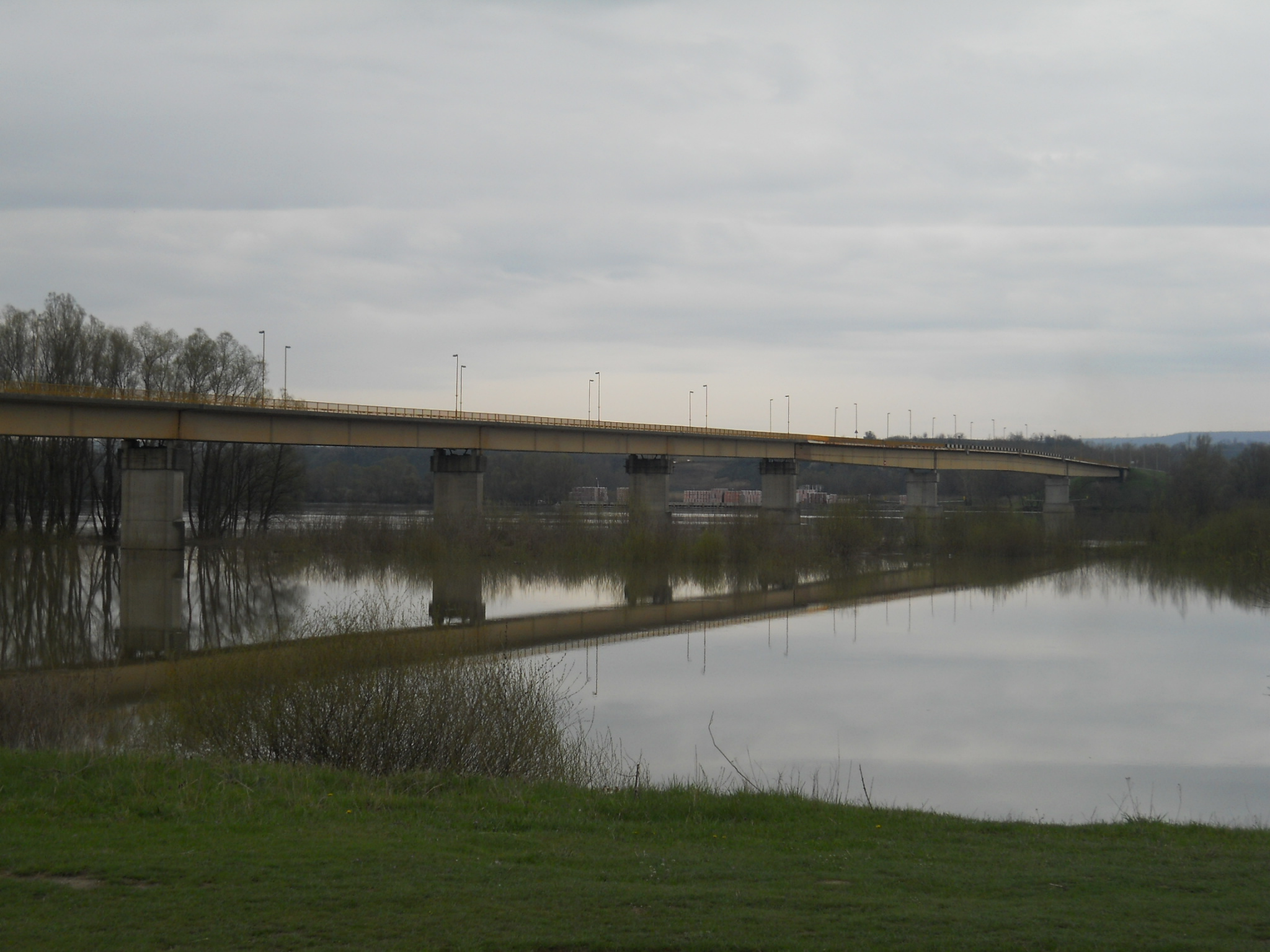
- View of the Bridge from Bačka Palanka riverbank
- Coordinates: 45°13′58″N 19°24′06″E
- Crosses: Danube
- Locale: Bačka Palanka, Vojvodina, Serbia; Ilok, Vukovar-Syrmia, Croatia
- Named for: Relay of Youth
- Preceded by: Erdut–Bogojevo Railway Bridge
- Followed by: Liberty Bridge, Novi Sad

Characteristics
- Design: girder bridge
- Total length: 825 meters

History
- Opened: 1974
- Rebuilt: 2002

Location
- Interactive map of Ilok–Bačka Palanka Bridge; 25 May Bridge

The Ilok–Bačka Palanka Bridge or the 25 May Bridge crosses the Danube at its 1297th kilometer, connecting the towns of Ilok, Croatia and Bačka Palanka, Serbia. It is the 825 meters long single-carriageway road bridge, built as a box girder construction.

== History ==
It was opened in 1974 as the "25 May" Bridge, named after the birthday of Yugoslav leader Josip Broz Tito. The bridge was damaged by airplane bombs during the NATO bombing of Yugoslavia on 4 April 1999. After reconstruction, it was opened for truck and bus traffic on 30 April 2002.

The bridge is a border crossing itself, and there is an additional land crossing nearby, towards the village of Neštin in the west. It is the terminal point of the Croatian D2 road and a part of Serbian road M18.

== See also ==
- List of bridges in Serbia
- List of crossings of the Danube
