= Josipovac, Osijek =

Josipovac
- Village
- Location within Osijek-Baranja County Location within Croatia
- Coordinates: 45°34′46″N 18°35′09″E
- Country: Croatia
- County: Osijek-Baranja
- City: Osijek

Area
  - Total: 16.2 km^{2} (6.3 sq mi)

Population (2021)
  - Total: 3,602
  - Density: 222/km^{2} (576/sq mi)
- Time zone: UTC+1 (CET)
  - Summer (DST): UTC+2 (CEST)
- Postal code: 31200 Josipovac
- Area code: 031
- Vehicle registration: OS

Josipovac (Hungarian: Józseffalva) is a suburb of Osijek in Croatia. It is connected by the D2 highway. According to the 2011 census, it has 4,101 inhabitants. Josipovac has two churches, two graveyards, an elementary school, an ambulance and a lot more.
South of Josipovac, there is a broadcasting centre with a free-standing lattice tower and a 110.3 metres tall guyed mast. Latter mast is insulated against ground and was before 1978 used for broadcasting on 1412 kHz and after 1978 for broadcasting on 594 kHz with 10 kW.
