= D418 road =

Road in Croatia

D418 state road

Route information
- Length: 2.5 km (1.6 mi)

Major junctions
- From: D2 south of Osijek
- To: Osijek Airport

Location
- Country: Croatia
- Counties: Osijek-Baranja

Highway system
- Highways in Croatia

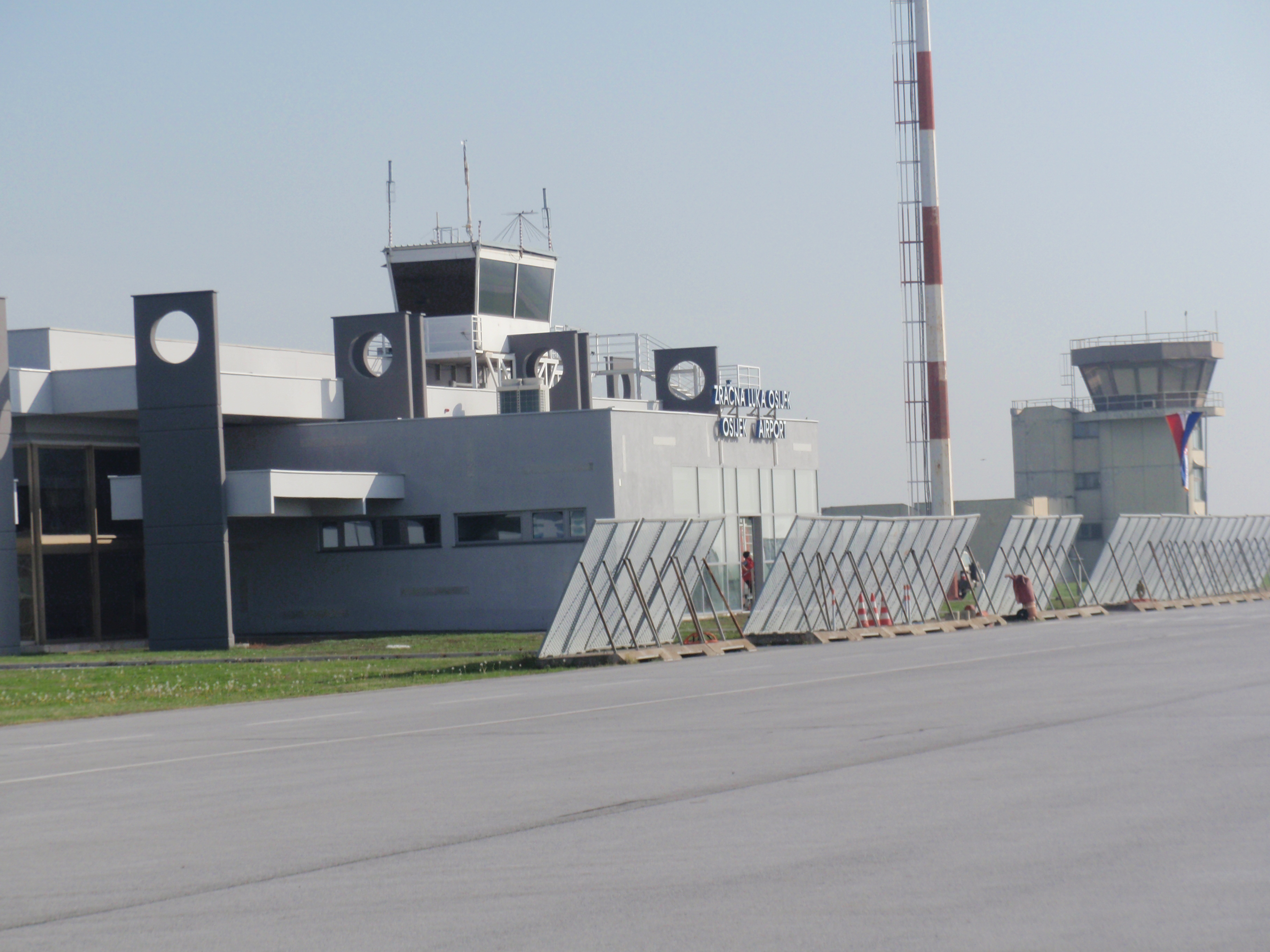
Osijek Airport, at the southern terminus of the D418 road

D418 branches off to the south from D2 east of the eastern end of Osijek bypass towards Osijek Airport. The road is 2.5 km (1.6 mi) long.

Like all state roads in Croatia, the D418 too is managed and maintained by Hrvatske ceste, state owned company.

== Road junctions and populated areas ==
D417 junctions/populated areas
Type	Slip roads/Notes
	D2 to Vukovar (to the east) and to Osijek (to the west). The northern terminus of the road.
	Osijek Airport; The southern terminus of the road.
