= Majerje =

Coordinates: 46°20′N 16°15′E

- Village
- Interactive map of Majerje
- Country: Croatia
- County: Varaždin County

Area
  - Total: 7.4 km^{2} (2.9 sq mi)

Population (2021)
  - Total: 687
  - Density: 93/km^{2} (240/sq mi)
- Time zone: UTC+1 (CET)
  - Summer (DST): UTC+2 (CEST)

Majerje is a village in Croatia. It is connected by the D2 highway.
