= Križovljan Radovečki =

Coordinates: 46°21′58″N 16°07′34″E

- Village
- Interactive map of Križovljan Radovečki
- Country: Croatia
- County: Varaždin County

Area
  - Total: 0.2 km^{2} (0.077 sq mi)

Population (2021)
  - Total: 235
  - Density: 1,200/km^{2} (3,000/sq mi)
- Time zone: UTC+1 (CET)
  - Summer (DST): UTC+2 (CEST)

Križovljan Radovečki is a village in Croatia. It is connected by the D2 highway.
