= Kloštar Podravski =

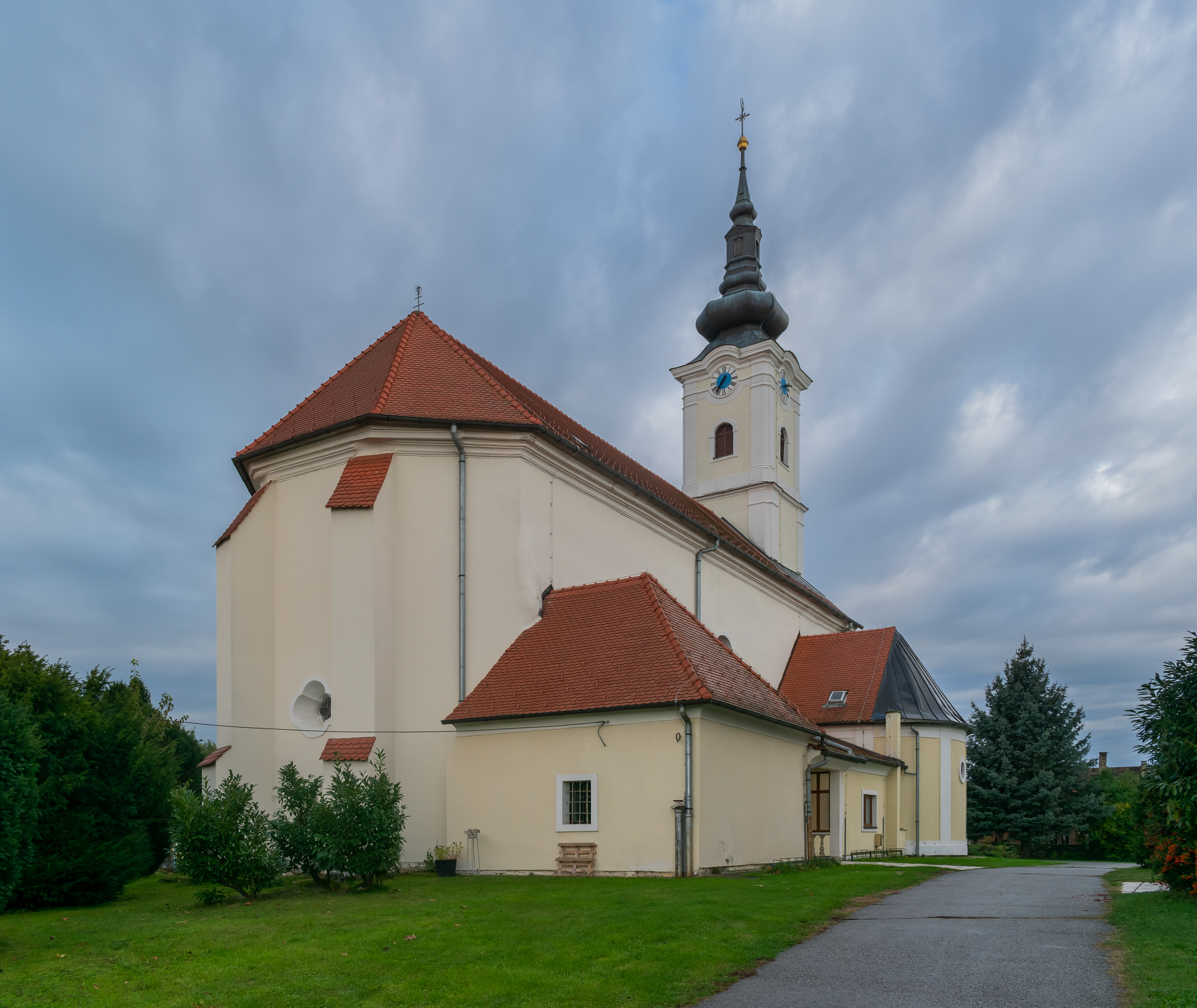
- Church in Kloštar Podravski
- Interactive map of Kloštar Podravski
- Location within Croatia
- Coordinates: 45°59′N 17°09′E
- Country: Croatia
- County: Koprivnica-Križevci County

Government
  - Mayor: Siniša Pavlović (HDZ)

Area
  - Total: 51.3 km^{2} (19.8 sq mi)

Population (2021)
  - Total: 2,749
  - Density: 53.6/km^{2} (139/sq mi)
- Time zone: UTC+1 (CET)
  - Summer (DST): UTC+2 (CEST)
- Postal code: 48350 Đurđevac
- Website: klostarpodravski.hr

Kloštar Podravski is a settlement and a municipality in the Koprivnica-Križevci County in Croatia.

According to the 2021 census, the municipality had 2,749 inhabitants, with Croats forming an absolute majority at 99.27%.

== History ==
In the late 19th century and early 20th century, Kloštar Podravski was part of the Bjelovar-Križevci County of the Kingdom of Croatia-Slavonia.

== Demographics ==
In 2021, the municipality had 2,749 residents in the following settlements:

- Budančevica, population 396
- Kloštar Podravski, population 1,281
- Kozarevac, population 486
- Prugovac, population 586
Kloštar Podravski: Population trends 1857–2021
v

population	2793	3162	3135	3840	4412	4539	4528	4694	4769	4849	4753	4453	4095	3893	3603	3306	2749
	1857	1869	1880	1890	1900	1910	1921	1931	1948	1953	1961	1971	1981	1991	2001	2011	2021

Sources: Croatian Bureau of Statistics publications

== Administration ==
The current mayor of Kloštar Podravski is Siniša Pavlović (HDZ) and the Kloštar Podravski Municipal Council consists of 13 seats.

Groups	Councilors per group
HDZ	9 / 13
Free Voters Group	2 / 13
HSS-Mreža	1 / 13
SDP	1 / 13
