= Štaglinec =

Coordinates: 46°07′24″N 16°52′31″E

- Village
- Interactive map of Štaglinec
- Country: Croatia
- County: Koprivnica-Križevci
- Town: Koprivnica

Area
  - Total: 1.9 km^{2} (0.73 sq mi)

Population (2021)
  - Total: 453
  - Density: 240/km^{2} (620/sq mi)
- Time zone: UTC+1 (CET)
  - Summer (DST): UTC+2 (CEST)

Štaglinec is a village in Croatia. It is connected by the D2 highway.
