= Bistrica, Croatia =

Bistrica
- Village
- Location within Croatia
- Coordinates: 45°44′N 17°37′E
- Country: Croatia
- County: Virovitica-Podravina County
- Municipality: Slatina

Area
  - Total: 6.3 km^{2} (2.4 sq mi)

Population (2021)
  - Total: 118
  - Density: 19/km^{2} (49/sq mi)
- Time zone: UTC+1 (CET)
  - Summer (DST): UTC+2 (CEST)
- Postal code: 33520 Slatina

Bistrica is a village near Slatina, Croatia. It is connected by the D2 highway.
