= Poljanec =

- Village
- Location of Poljanec in Croatia
- Coordinates: 46°16′N 16°34′E
- Country: Croatia
- County: Varaždin County
- Municipality: Martijanec

Area
  - Total: 5.0 km^{2} (1.9 sq mi)

Population (2021)
  - Total: 603
  - Density: 120/km^{2} (310/sq mi)
- Time zone: UTC+1 (CET)
  - Summer (DST): UTC+2 (CEST)
- Postal code: 42230 Ludbreg
- Area code: +385 (0)42

Poljanec is a village in Croatia. It is on the D2 highway.
