= Lozan =

- Village
- Location within Croatia
- Coordinates: 45°53′N 17°17′E
- Country: Croatia
- County: Virovitica-Podravina County
- Municipality: Špišić Bukovica

Area
  - Total: 11.4 km^{2} (4.4 sq mi)

Population (2021)
  - Total: 340
  - Density: 30/km^{2} (77/sq mi)
- Time zone: UTC+1 (CET)
  - Summer (DST): UTC+2 (CEST)

Lozan is a village in Croatia. It is connected by the D2 highway.
