= Gornje Vratno =

Coordinates: 46°22′N 16°09′E

- Village
- Interactive map of Gornje Vratno
- Country: Croatia
- County: Varaždin County

Area
  - Total: 5.0 km^{2} (1.9 sq mi)

Population (2021)
  - Total: 1,297
  - Density: 260/km^{2} (670/sq mi)
- Time zone: UTC+1 (CET)
  - Summer (DST): UTC+2 (CEST)

Gornje Vratno is a village in Croatia. It is connected by the D2 highway.
