= D417 road =

Road in Croatia

D417 state road

Route information
- Length: 2.3 km (1.4 mi)

Major junctions
- From: D2 near Osijek
- To: Port of Osijek

Location
- Country: Croatia
- Counties: Osijek-Baranja

Highway system
- Highways in Croatia

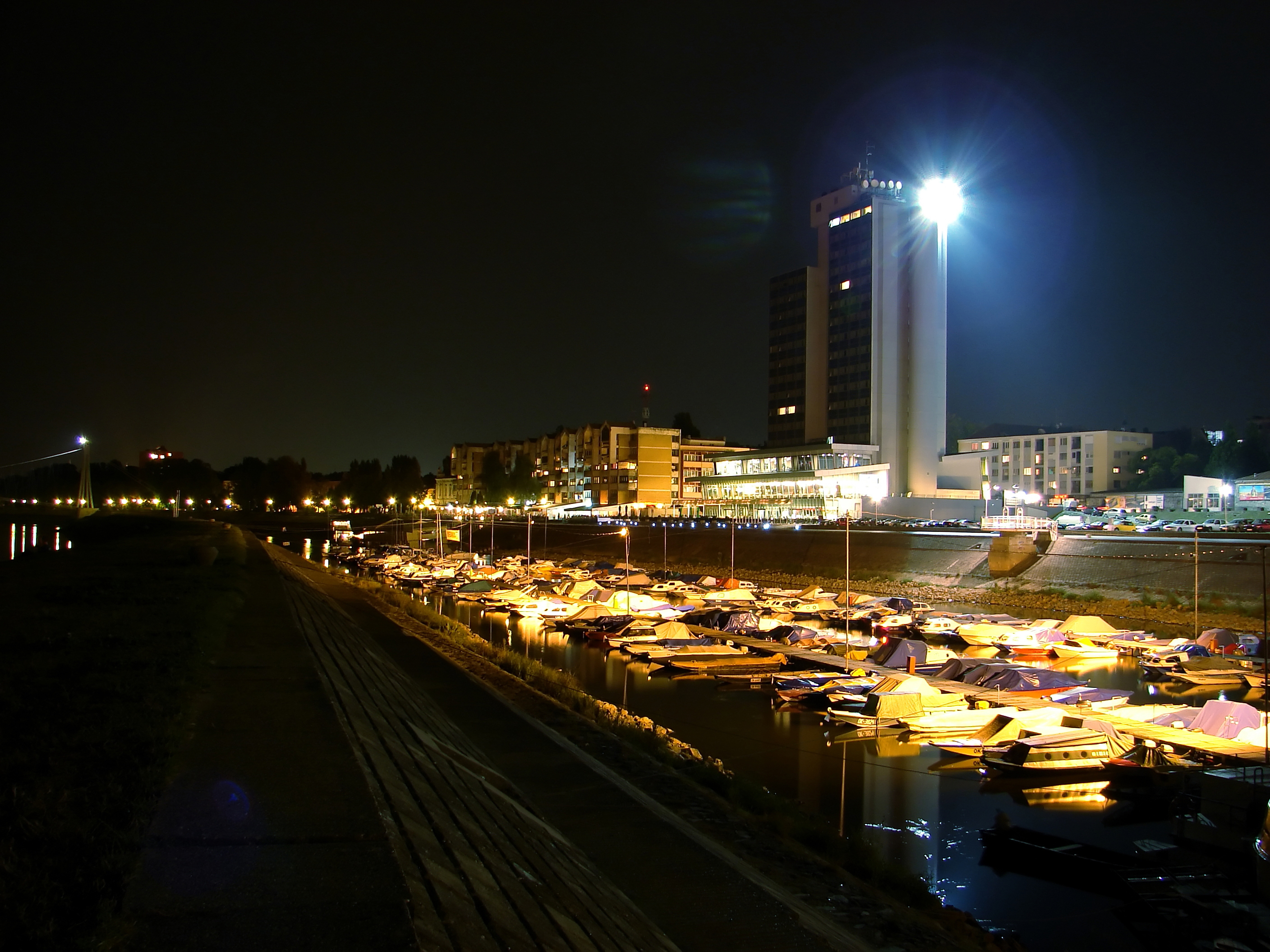
Osijek, at the northern terminus of the D417 road

D417 branches off to the north from D2 at the eastern end of Osijek bypass towards Port of Osijek and to the eastern parts of the city of Osijek and to Nemetin. The road is 2.3 km (1.4 mi) long.

The D417, like all state roads in Croatia, is managed and maintained by Hrvatske ceste, state owned company.

== Road junctions and populated areas ==
D417 junctions/populated areas
Type	Slip roads/Notes
	D2 to Vukovar (to the east) and to Našice and the A5 motorway Osijek interchange (to the west). The southern terminus of the road.
	Ž4068 to Osijek and Nemetin.
	Port of Osijek; The northern terminus of the road.
