= Kunovec Breg =

Coordinates: 46°11′10″N 16°46′00″E

- Village
- Interactive map of Kunovec Breg
- Country: Croatia
- County: Koprivnica-Križevci
- Municipality: Koprivnica

Area
  - Total: 1.8 sq mi (4.6 km^{2})

Population (2021)
  - Total: 578
  - Density: 330/sq mi (130/km^{2})
- Time zone: UTC+1 (CET)
  - Summer (DST): UTC+2 (CEST)

Kunovec Breg is a village in Croatia. It is connected by the D2 highway.
