= Čičkovina =

- Village
- Location of Čičkovina in Croatia
- Coordinates: 46°17′N 16°32′E
- Country: Croatia
- County: Varaždin County
- Municipality: Martijanec

Area
  - Total: 5.2 km^{2} (2.0 sq mi)

Population (2021)
  - Total: 169
  - Density: 33/km^{2} (84/sq mi)
- Time zone: UTC+1 (CET)
  - Summer (DST): UTC+2 (CEST)
- Postal code: 42230 Ludbreg
- Area code: +385 (0)42

Čičkovina is a village in Croatia. It is connected by the D2 highway.
