= Bukovački Antunovac =

Coordinates: 45°38′09″N 17°47′38″E

- Village
- Interactive map of Bukovački Antunovac
- Country: Croatia
- County: Virovitica-Podravina County
- Municipality: Nova Bukovica

Area
  - Total: 5.6 km^{2} (2.2 sq mi)

Population (2021)
  - Total: 109
  - Density: 19/km^{2} (50/sq mi)
- Time zone: UTC+1 (CET)
  - Summer (DST): UTC+2 (CEST)

Bukovački Antunovac is a village in Croatia. It is connected by the D2 highway.
