= Cret Bizovački =

- Village (Selo)
- Location within Osijek-Baranja County Location within Croatia Location within Europe
- Country: Croatia
- County: Osijek-Baranja County

Area
  - Total: 8.8 km^{2} (3.4 sq mi)

Population (2021)
  - Total: 485
  - Density: 55/km^{2} (140/sq mi)
- Time zone: UTC+1 (CET)
  - Summer (DST): UTC+2 (CEST)

Cret Bizovački is a village in Croatia. It is connected by the D2 highway.
