= Martin, Croatia =

Martin
- Village (Selo)
- Location within Croatia
- Coordinates: 45.491241°N 18.073795°E
- Country: Croatia
- County: Osijek-Baranja
- Municipality: Našice

Area
  - Total: 4.6 km^{2} (1.8 sq mi)

Population (2021)
  - Total: 945
  - Density: 210/km^{2} (530/sq mi)
- Time zone: UTC+1 (CET)
  - Summer (DST): UTC+2 (CEST)

Martin is a village in Croatia. It is connected by the D2 highway.
