= Budančevica =

Coordinates: 45°59′N 17°09′E

- Villlage
- Interactive map of Budančevica
- Country: Croatia
- County: Koprivnica-Križevci County

Area
  - Total: 3.9 km^{2} (1.5 sq mi)

Population (2021)
  - Total: 396
  - Density: 100/km^{2} (260/sq mi)
- Time zone: UTC+1 (CET)
  - Summer (DST): UTC+2 (CEST)

Budančevica is a village in Croatia. Budančevica is connected by the D2 highway.
