= Nova Bukovica =

- Location within Croatia
- Coordinates: 45°39′36″N 17°46′1″E
- Country: Croatia
- County: Virovitica-Podravina County

Area
  - Total: 74.9 km^{2} (28.9 sq mi)

Population (2021)
  - Total: 1,275
  - Density: 17.0/km^{2} (44.1/sq mi)
- Time zone: UTC+1 (CET)
  - Summer (DST): UTC+2 (CEST)
- Website: novabukovica.hr

Nova Bukovica is a village and municipality in Croatia in the Virovitica–Podravina County.

In the 2011 census it had a total population of 1,771, in the following settlements:

- Bjelkovac, population 52
- Brezik, population 158
- Bukovački Antunovac, population 198
- Dobrović, population 128
- Donja Bukovica, population 85
- Gornje Viljevo, population 31
- Miljevci, population 317
- Nova Bukovica, population 802

In the same census, 85% of the population were Croats.

== Politics ==
=== Minority councils ===
Directly elected minority councils and representatives are tasked with consulting tasks for the local or regional authorities in which they are advocating for minority rights and interests, integration into public life and participation in the management of local affairs. At the 2023 Croatian national minorities councils and representatives elections Serbs of Croatia fulfilled legal requirements to elect 10 members minority councils of the Municipality of Nova Bukovica but with only 9 representatives being elected in the body in the end.
