= Donji Meljani =

Coordinates: 45°44′N 17°38′E

- Village
- Interactive map of Donji Meljani
- Country: Croatia
- County: Virovitica-Podravina County

Area
  - Total: 6.2 km^{2} (2.4 sq mi)

Population (2021)
  - Total: 206
  - Density: 33/km^{2} (86/sq mi)
- Time zone: UTC+1 (CET)
  - Summer (DST): UTC+2 (CEST)

Donji Meljani is a village in Croatia. It is connected by the D2 highway.
