= Kozice, Croatia =

Coordinates: 45°41′N 17°44′E

Kozice
- Village
- Interactive map of Kozice
- Country: Croatia
- County: Virovitica-Podravina County

Area
  - Total: 23.4 km^{2} (9.0 sq mi)

Population (2021)
  - Total: 403
  - Density: 17.2/km^{2} (44.6/sq mi)
- Time zone: UTC+1 (CET)
  - Summer (DST): UTC+2 (CEST)

Kozice, Croatia is a village in Croatia. It is connected by the D2 highway.
