= Donji Daruvar =

Donji Daruvar Dolní Daruvar (Czech)
- Village
- Location within Croatia
- Country: Croatia
- County: Bjelovar-Bilogora County
- Municipality: Daruvar

Area
  - Total: 2.5 sq mi (6.4 km^{2})

Population (2021)
  - Total: 624
  - Density: 250/sq mi (98/km^{2})
- Time zone: UTC+1 (CET)
  - Summer (DST): UTC+2 (CEST)

Donji Daruvar (Czech: Dolni Daruvar) is a village in Croatia. It is connected by the D5 highway.

According to the 2021 census, its population was 624.
