= Dubrava Križovljanska =

Coordinates: 46°22′52″N 16°03′40″E

- Village
- Interactive map of Dubrava Križovljanska
- Country: Croatia
- County: Varaždin County

Area
  - Total: 2.4 km^{2} (0.93 sq mi)

Population (2021)
  - Total: 216
  - Density: 90/km^{2} (230/sq mi)
- Time zone: UTC+1 (CET)
  - Summer (DST): UTC+2 (CEST)

Dubrava Križovljanska is a village in Croatia, near the border with Slovenia. It is connected by the D2 highway.
