= Špišić Bukovica =

- Location of Špišić Bukovica in Croatia
- Coordinates: 45.85°N 17.3°E
- Country: Croatia
- County: Virovitica-Podravina County

Area
  - City: 107.8 km^{2} (41.6 sq mi)
  - Urban: 32.4 km^{2} (12.5 sq mi)

Population (2021)
  - City: 3,303
  - Density: 30.64/km^{2} (79.36/sq mi)
  - Urban: 1,346
  - Urban density: 41.5/km^{2} (108/sq mi)
- Website: spisicbukovica.hr

Špišić Bukovica is a municipality in Croatia in the Virovitica–Podravina County.

== Demographics ==
It has a total population of 4,221 (2011 census), in the following settlements:

- Bušetina, population 815
- Lozan, population 440
- Novi Antunovac, population 101
- Okrugljača, population 272
- Rogovac, population 228
- Špišić Bukovica, population 1,686
- Vukosavljevica, population 679

98.5% of the population are Croats, per census 2001.

Colonist settlements of Jova reka, Okrugljača, and Špišić Bukovica were established on the territory of the village municipality during the land reform in interwar Yugoslavia.

== History ==
In the late 19th century and early 20th century, Špišić Bukovica was part of the Virovitica County of the Kingdom of Croatia-Slavonia.
