= Bakić, Croatia =

Coordinates: 45°44′N 17°41′E

Bakić
- Village
- Interactive map of Bakić
- Country: Croatia
- County: Virovitica-Podravina County

Area
  - Total: 11.2 km^{2} (4.3 sq mi)

Population (2021)
  - Total: 428
  - Density: 38.2/km^{2} (99.0/sq mi)
- Time zone: UTC+1 (CET)
  - Summer (DST): UTC+2 (CEST)

Bakić is a village in Croatia.
