= Miljevci, Virovitica-Podravina County =

Coordinates: 45°40′04″N 17°49′35″E

- Interactive map of Miljevci, Virovitica-Podravina County

Miljevci is a village near Nova Bukovica, Croatia. In the 2011 census, it had 317 inhabitants.
