= Feričanci =

- Municipality
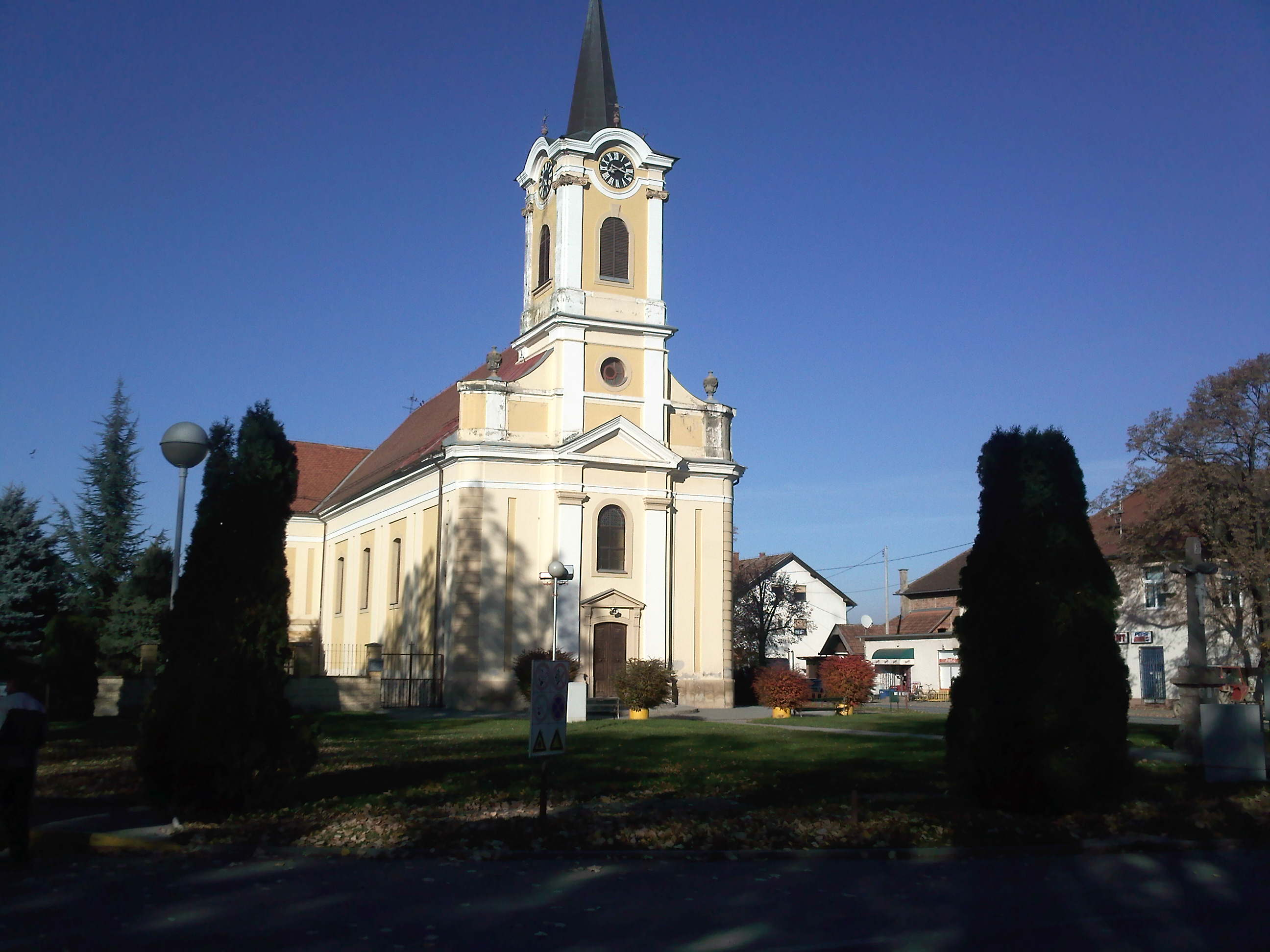

- Location in Croatia Feričanci (Croatia)
- Coordinates: 45°31′25″N 17°58′39″E
- Country: Croatia
- Region: Slavonia
- County: Osijek-Baranja County

Government
  - Mayor: Antun Glavaš

Area
  - Municipality: 45.8 km^{2} (17.7 sq mi)
  - Urban: 21.4 km^{2} (8.3 sq mi)

Population (2021)
  - Municipality: 1,725
  - Density: 37.7/km^{2} (97.5/sq mi)
  - Urban: 1,332
  - Urban density: 62.2/km^{2} (161/sq mi)
- Time zone: UTC+1 (Central European Time)
- Website: opcina-fericanci.hr

Feričanci (Hungarian: Ferencfalva) is a municipality in Osijek-Baranja County, Croatia.

There are a total of 2,134 inhabitants (census 2011), in the following settlements:

- Feričanci, population 1,626
- Gazije, population 53
- Valenovac, population 185
- Vučjak Feričanački, population 270

97% of the population are Croats (2011 census).

== Name ==
The name of the village in Croatian is plural. In German, the village was called also "Feritschanze".
