= Gornji Miholjac =

Coordinates: 45°46′N 17°39′E

- Village
- Interactive map of Gornji Miholjac
- Country: Croatia
- County: Virovitica-Podravina County

Area
  - Total: 10.6 km^{2} (4.1 sq mi)

Population (2021)
  - Total: 214
  - Density: 20.2/km^{2} (52.3/sq mi)
- Time zone: UTC+1 (CET)
  - Summer (DST): UTC+2 (CEST)

Gornji Miholjac is a village in Croatia.
