= D530 road =

Road in Croatia

D530 state road

Route information
- Length: 1.6 km (0.99 mi)

Major junctions
- From: D2 near Zamlaka
- To: A4 in Ludbreg interchange

Location
- Country: Croatia
- Counties: Varaždin

Highway system
- Highways in Croatia

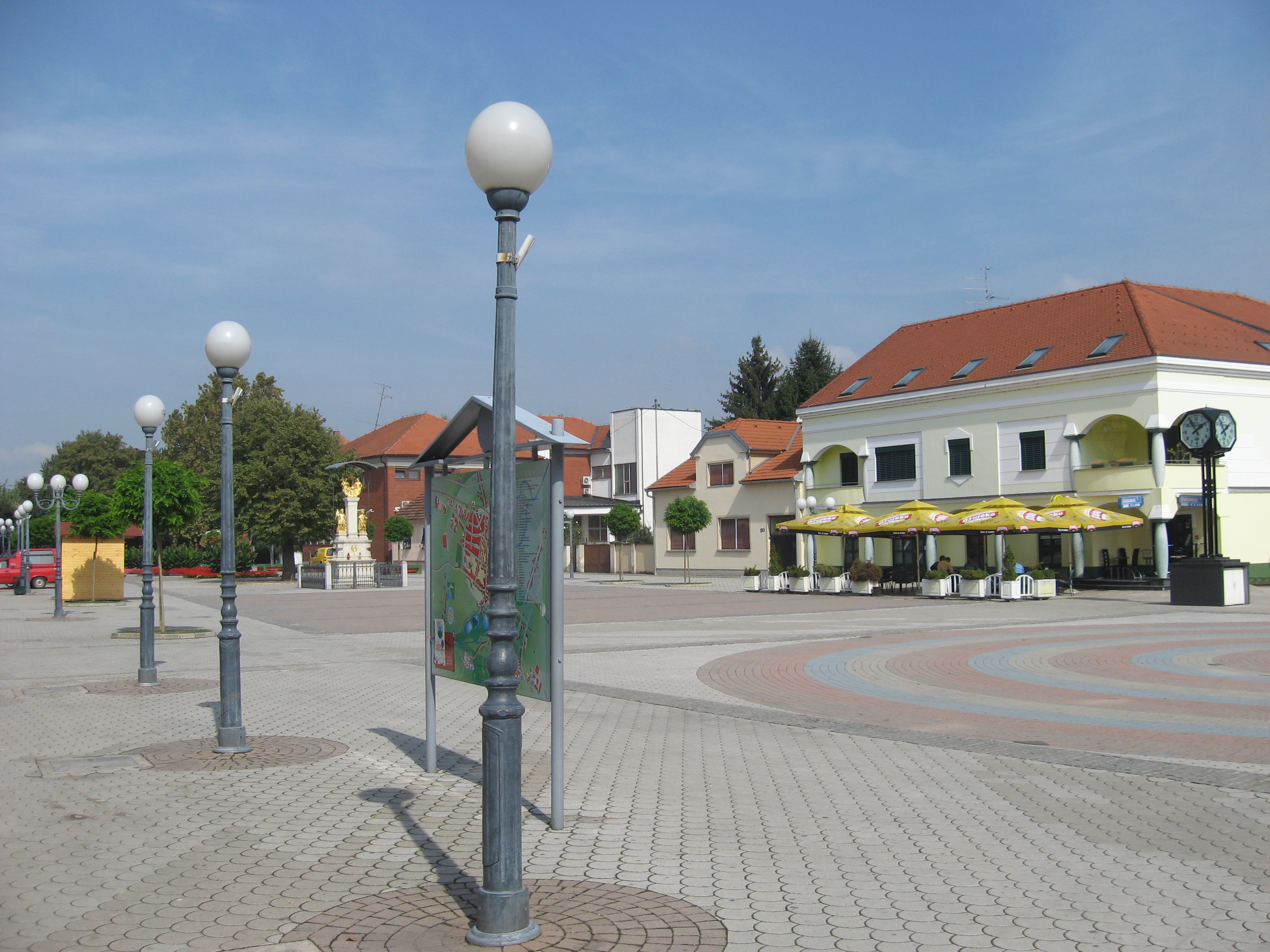
The D530 connects Ludbreg and the A4 motorway

D530 connects the A4 motorway Ludbreg interchange to the D2 state road, near the village of Zamlaka providing access to the motorway from Koprivnica, Ludbreg and Varaždin. The road is 1.6 km (0.99 mi) long.

Like all state roads in Croatia, the D530 is managed and maintained by Hrvatske ceste, state owned company.

== Traffic volume ==
The D530 state road traffic volume is not reported by Hrvatske ceste, however they regularly count and report traffic volume on the A4 motorway Ludbreg interchange, which connects to the D530 road only, thus permitting the D530 road traffic volume to be accurately calculated. The report includes no information on ASDT volumes.

D530 traffic volume
Road	Counting site	AADT	ASDT	Notes
A4	Ludbreg interchange	498	n/a	Southbound A4 traffic leaving the motorway at the interchange.
A4	Ludbreg interchange	528	n/a	Southbound A4 traffic entering the motorway at the interchange.
A4	Ludbreg interchange	94	n/a	Northbound A4 traffic leaving the motorway at the interchange.
A4	Ludbreg interchange	93	n/a	Northbound A4 traffic entering the motorway at the interchange.
D530	Ludbreg interchange	1,213	n/a	Total traffic entering/leaving the A4 motorway from/to D530.

== Road junctions and populated areas ==
D530 junctions/populated areas
Type	Slip roads/Notes
	D2 to Bartolovec and Varaždin (D3) (to the west) and to Ludbreg and Koprivnica (to the east). The eastern terminus of the road.
	A4 in Ludbreg interchange, to Varaždin and Zagreb (to the south) and to Čakovec (to the north). The western terminus of the road.

== See also ==
- A4 motorway
