= List of disasters in Croatia by death toll =

The list of disasters in Croatia by death toll includes major disasters and accidents - excluding warfare and other intentional acts - that took place on Croatian soil and resulted in 10 or more fatalities:

Disaster	Type	Location	Deaths	Date	References
1667 Dubrovnik earthquake	Earthquake	Dubrovnik	c. 2000-5000	6 April 1667	
Raša coal mine explosion (Note: The sources quote various figures, from 185 to 491. The higher figures are now ascribed to confusion in initial reporting, when injured and hospitalized miners were erroneously counted as dead.)	Explosion	Raša	185	28 February 1940	
SS Baron Gautsch (Note: The sources quote various figures, including estimates of over 300 fatalities.)	Shipwreck	Adriatic Sea	177	13 August 1914	
1976 Zagreb mid-air collision	Aircrash	Zagreb	176	10 September 1976	
Zagreb train disaster	Railway accident	Zagreb	153	30 August 1974	
Raša coal mine explosion	Explosion	Raša	86	14 March 1948	
Aviogenex Flight 130	Aircrash	Rijeka Airport	78	23 May 1971	
Medveščak flood	Flood	Medveščak	52	26 July 1651	
1996 Croatia USAF CT-43 crash	Aircrash	North East of Cavtat	35	3 April 1996	
Bilaj bus accident	Crash	Bilaj near Gospić, M604 railway	25	29 September 1983	
Rijeka hospital fire	Fire	Rijeka	23	28 March 1975	
Plavno train accident	Railway accident	Plavno	21	14 August 1949	
1954 Zagreb tram accident	Railway accident	Zagreb	19	31 October 1954	
1964 Zagreb flood	Flood	Zagreb	17	26 October 1964	
Sveti Petar u Šumi derailment	Railway accident	Sveti Petar u Šumi	15	5 August 1949	
Risnjak Ju 52 crash	Aircrash	Risnjak	15	29 June 1951	
Popovac bus accident	Crash	Popovac	14	30 September 1967	
Pojatno bus accident	Crash	Pojatno	14	22 September 1989	
A1 bus crash	Crash	A1 highway near Gospić	14	7 September 2008	
August Cesarec fire	Fire	Adriatic Sea	12	18 September 1971	
2007 Kornat fire	Fire	Kornat	12	30 August 2007	
A4 bus crash	Crash	A4 highway near Breznički Hum	12	6 August 2022	
Medvednica DC-3 crash	Aircrash	Medvednica	10	21 September 1950	
Aurora–Ilirija ship collision	Shipwreck	Adriatic Sea	10	6 May 1992	
A3 bus crash	Crash	A3 highway near Slavonski Brod	10	25 July 2021	

== See also ==
- List of disasters in Antarctica by death toll
- List of disasters in Australia by death toll
- List of disasters in Canada by death toll
- List of disasters in Germany by death toll
- List of disasters in Great Britain and Ireland by death toll
- List of disasters in New Zealand by death toll
- List of disasters in Poland by death toll
- List of disasters in Ukraine by death toll
- List of disasters in the United States by death toll
