= Milan Crnković =

Croatian writer

Milan Crnković (February 15, 1925 – 1998) was a Croatian children's literature professor and critic.

== Biography ==
Crnković was born in the village of Apatija near Ludbreg, in the Podravina region of Croatia. His parents were Franjo and Jelka Crnkovic (née Sever). He was the oldest of four children.

He attended elementary school in the neighboring village of Slokovec.

In September 1949, Crnković accepted a position in a technical high school in Rijeka. On February 15, 1950 he married Anka Sutic in Zagreb. They had three children: Marija, Berislav, and Nella. He died from complications of lung cancer on April 20, 1998.

== Major works ==
- Children's Literature, school book. Printed in Zagreb in 1967.
- Problems and Criteria in the Evaluation of Children's Literature. Art and the child. Vol 13, pp 5–17. Printed in Zagreb in 1971.
- Vocabulary of Cakavian songs of Dear Gervais. Published in Rijeka in 1975.
- The Narrative of Brlic Mazuranic. Vol 35, p. 2-24. Published in Rijeka in 1975. Published in Italian.
- Stories of Duro Turic. Vol 2, p 109-115. Published in Rijeka in 1977.
- Croatian Children's Literature to the End of the 19th Century. School book published in Zagreb in 1978.
- The Nonsense Grammar and Style of Zvonimir Balog. Vol 3 p 36-36. Published in Novi Sad in 1979.
- Society in Children's Literature. Vol 65, p 17-29. Published in Zagreb in 1980.
- A Children's Story. Published in Novi Sad in 1982.
- Telegraphic or Epigrammatic fables of Gustav Krkleca. Vol 4, p 35-52. Published in Zagreb in 1983.
- Antun Barac and Croatian Children's Literature. Proceedings of Barcev. University of Zagreb, 1984.
- What Children's Stories (anthology of children's stories with interpretations. Published in Zagreb in 1987.
