= Salnikov =

Salnikov (Russian: Сальников) is a surname of Russian origin. The name has derived from the Russian word salnik that means a gland.

It may refer to:

- Aleksandr Salnikov (1949-2017) Soviet Ukrainian basketball player and Olympian
- Andrei Salnikov (born 1982), Russian footballer
- Anton Salnikov (born 1979), prizewinner at the Franz Liszt Piano Competition
- Oleg Salnikov (born 1975), Russian footballer
- Roman Salnikov (born 1976), Ukrainian ice hockey left wing
- Sergei Salnikov (1925–1984), Soviet footballer and manager
- Vladimir Salnikov (born 1960), Russian swimmer and world record holder
- Yuri Salnikov (born 1950), Soviet equestrian and Olympic champion

== See also ==
- Selnik (disambiguation)
