= Štefanec =

Štefanec may refer to:

== People ==
- Ivan Štefanec, Slovak politician

== Villages in Croatia ==
- Štefanec, Međimurje County
- Štefanec, Varaždin County
