= Čukovec =

Čukovec may refer to:

- Čukovec, Varaždin County, a village near Ludbreg, Croatia
- Čukovec, Međimurje County, a village near Prelog, Croatia
