= Lake Varaždin =

- Varaždinsko jezero (Croatian)
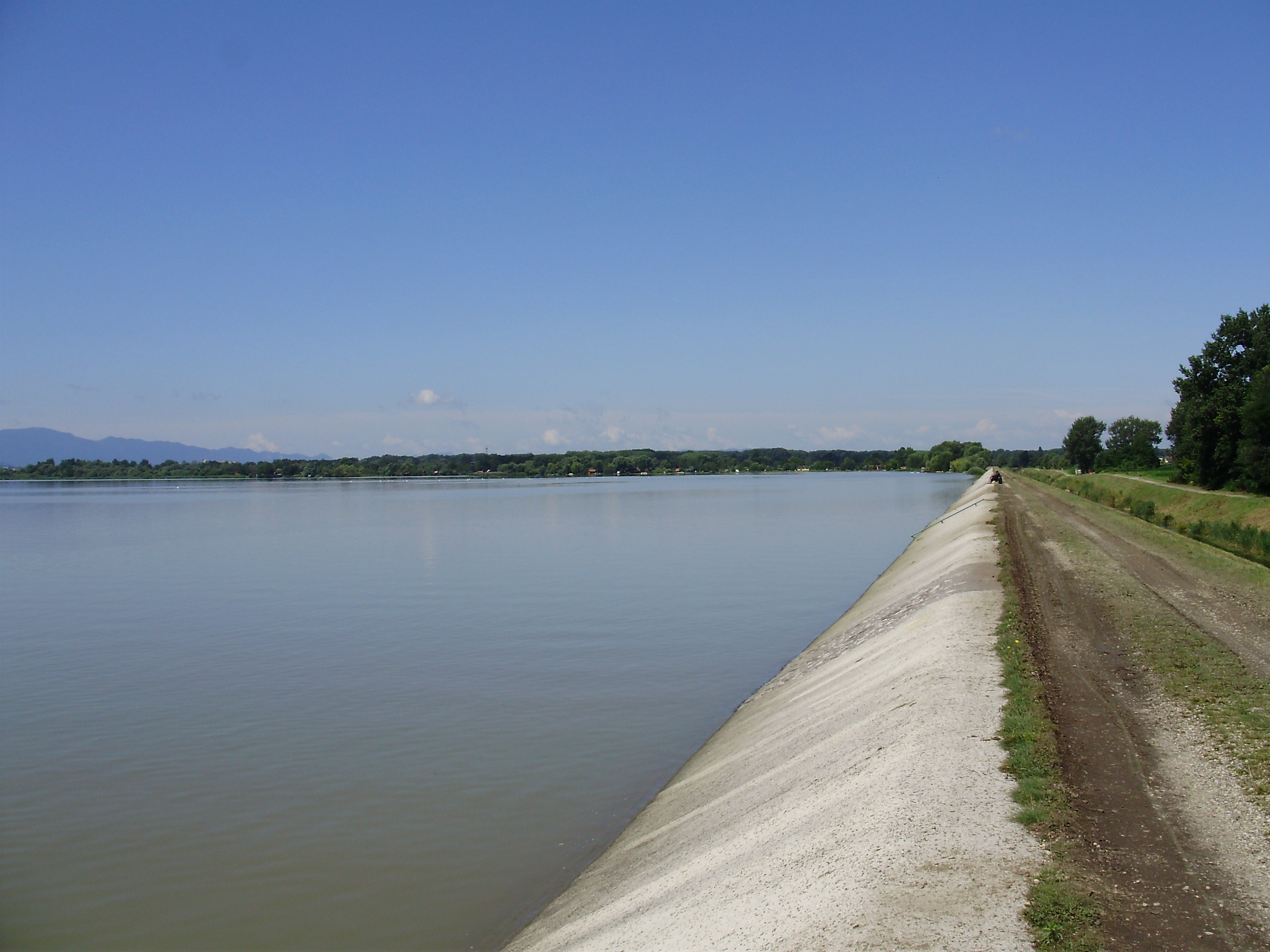

- Location within Croatia
- Interactive map of Lake Varaždin
- Location: Međimurje County, Croatia; Varaždin County, Croatia
- Coordinates: 46°19′N 16°24′E
- Type: reservoir
- Primary inflows: Drava
- Primary outflows: Drava
- Basin countries: Croatia
- Max. length: 7.5 km (4.7 mi)
- Max. width: 1.6 km (0.99 mi)
- Surface area: 10.1 km^{2} (3.9 sq mi)
- Surface elevation: 158 m (518 ft)
- Settlements: Gornji Kuršanec, Varaždin, Bartolovec, Štefanec

Lake Varaždin (Croatian: Varaždinsko jezero) is a reservoir on the Drava in northern Croatia. It is administratively divided between Međimurje County and Varaždin County, bordered by the municipalities of Varaždin, Trnovec Bartolovečki and Čakovec. The Drava flows into the reservoir near the city of Varaždin, while the dam is located near the village of Šemovec.

Lake Varaždin is one of three reservoirs built on the Drava in Croatia, the other two being the smaller Lake Ormož (which is located on the border with Slovenia) and the bigger Lake Dubrava. The three reservoirs and the power plants they serve form the Hydro North group of hydro power plants run by the HEP Group. It serves the Čakovec Hydro Power Plant, since the Varaždin Hydro Power Plant is served by Lake Ormož. The power plant was built in 1982.

== Tourism ==
Lake Varaždin is also a popular angling, leisure and water sports destination for many people from the region, especially during the summer. There are many log cabins built on the shores of the lake near Varaždin and Gornji Kuršanec.
