= Antun Blažić =

Croatian partisan

- Born: 28 May 1916; Globočec Ludbreški, Kingdom of Croatia-Slavonia, Austria-Hungary
- Died: September 1943 (aged 27); Maruševec, Independent State of Croatia

Antun Blažić (28 May 1916 – September 1943) was a Croatian Jewish Partisan and People's Hero of Yugoslavia.

Blažić was born in Globočec Ludbreški on 28 May 1916. In 1941, Blažić become a member of the Communist Party of Yugoslavia. During World War II, he was actively involved in the organization of the Ludbreg region uprising. In the summer of 1941, as one of the first in his region, Blažić joined the Partisans. With Partisans he was a commissioner assistant to a detachment assigned to form the task force in the Ludbreg region. Since 1943, Blažić was member of the League of Communists of Croatia district committee for Varaždin. In Varaždin he also helped the Partisan groups organization. Blažić was member of ZAVNOH. In September 1943, while in village Maruševec, Blažić was attacked by Ustaše. As he was alone, he could not retreat and thus decided to kill himself so he would not be taken alive. On 5 May 1951, Blažić was declared People's Hero of Yugoslavia.

== Bibliography ==
- Đurđević-Đukić, Olga (1975). Narodni heroji Jugoslavije, A-M, N-Ž. Beograd: Mladost.
