= Čakovec Hydroelectric Power Plant =

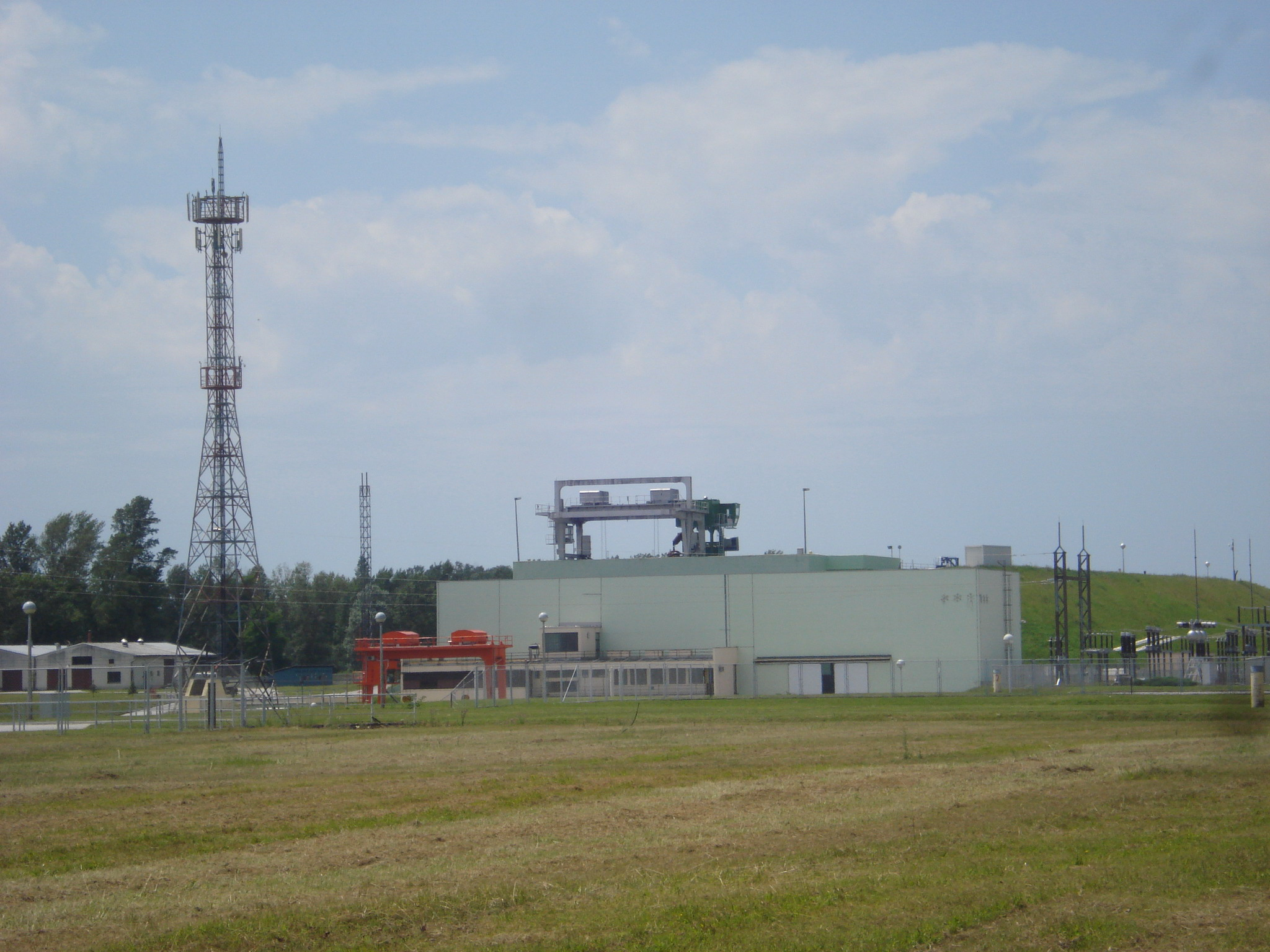
- Čakovec Hydroelectric Power Plant - east view
- Official name: Hidroelektrana Čakovec
- Country: Croatia
- Location: Čakovec, Međimurje County
- Coordinates: 46°18′41″N 16°29′40″E
- Status: Operational
- Commission date: 1982
- Owner: Hrvatska elektroprivreda
- Operator: Hrvatska elektroprivreda

Power generation
- Units operational: 4 × 21 MW
- Make and model: water turbine (4)
- Nameplate capacity: 84 MW

External links
- Commons: Related media on Commons

Čakovec Hydroelectric Power Plant is a large hydroelectric power plant in Croatia that has four turbines with a total nominal capacity of 78 MW (unit A - 38 MW, unit B - 38 MW, unit C - 1.1 MW and unit D - 0.34 MW).

== Overview ==
According to the type of power plant, it is a flow, low-pressure, derivation hydroelectric power plant with an accumulation (area of 10.5 km^{2} (4 sq mi) and volume of 51.6 [hm^3] for daily and partial weekly flow regulation. Units A and B of the power plant have horizontal pipe turbines and the generators are "in the bulb".

== Purpose ==
It is a multipurpose facility harnessing the Drava River water power, providing flood and erosion control, improving drainage, water supply, traffic and conditions for development of leisure industry and sports. Čakovec hydro plant installed power at generator terminals is 75.9 MW, and possible average annual output is 400 GWh. Gross head at the power house for Qi is 17.53 m.

The power plant, which uses Lake Varaždin as its reservoir, was completed in 1982. It is located near the villages of Šemovec and Orehovica. Although named after Čakovec, the county seat of Međimurje County, the power plant is almost entirely located within Varaždin County, while the reservoir is equally divided between the two counties.

It is operated by Hrvatska elektroprivreda.
