= A4 (Croatia) =

Motorway in Croatia

A4 motorway
- Autocesta A4
- Varaždinska autocesta
- in use other motorways

Route information
- Part of
- Length: 97.0 km (60.3 mi)

Major junctions
- From: Hungarian M7
- D20 in Čakovec interchange D530 in Ludbreg interchange D528 in Varaždin interchange D22 and D24 in Novi Marof interchange D10 in Sveta Helena interchange
- To: A3 in Ivanja Reka interchange

Location
- Country: Croatia
- Counties: City of Zagreb, Zagreb, Varaždin, Međimurje
- Major cities: Zagreb, Varaždin, Čakovec

Highway system
- Highways in Croatia

The A4 motorway (Croatian: Autocesta A4) is a motorway in Croatia spanning 97.0 kilometres (60.3 mi). It connects the nation's capital, Zagreb, to the city of Varaždin and to Budapest, Hungary via the Goričan border crossing. The motorway represents a major north–south transportation corridor in Croatia and is a part of European routes E65 and E71. The A4 motorway route also follows Pan-European corridor Vb.

Apart from Zagreb and Varaždin, the A4 motorway runs near a number of Croatian cities, and connects to the rest of the Croatian motorway network east of Zagreb. The motorway route was completed in 2008. The motorway's national significance is reflected in the positive economic impact on the cities and towns it connects, as well as its importance to tourism in Croatia. The genuine importance of the motorway as a transit route will be demonstrated upon completion of proposed expansion of Port of Rijeka and Rijeka transport node, since the A4 represents an integral part of the Rijeka–Zagreb–Budapest transport route.

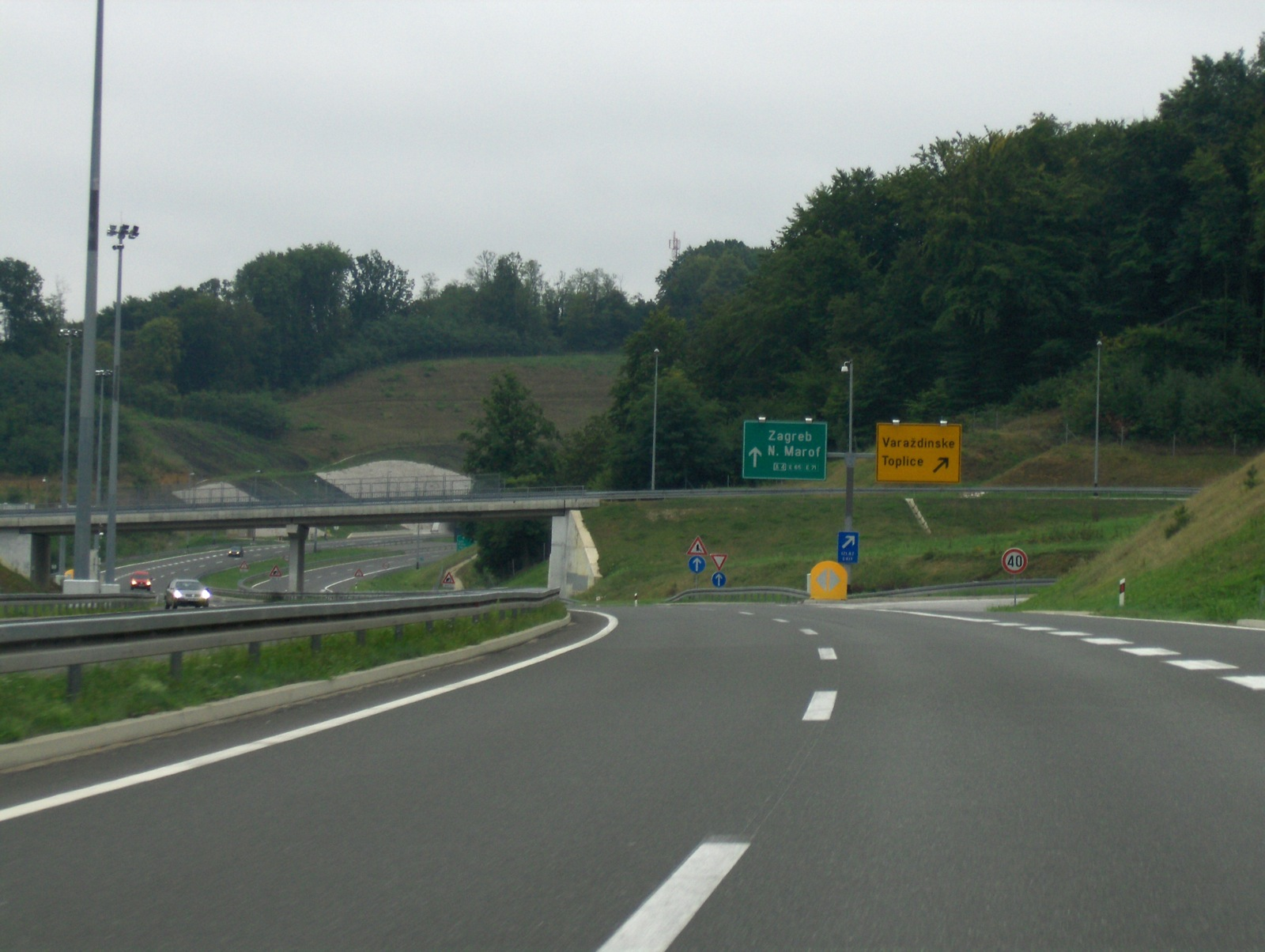
The A4 motorway at Varaždinske Toplice exit

As the route traverses hilly terrain, it requires a substantial number of viaducts and tunnels, as well as two major bridges to span the Drava and Mura rivers. The motorway consists of two traffic lanes and an emergency lane in each driving direction separated by a central reservation. There are no emergency lanes in the tunnels. All intersections of the A4 motorway are grade separated. As of October 2010, there are 12 exits and 3 rest areas operating along the route. As the motorway is tolled using a ticket system, each exit includes a toll plaza. Exits south of the Sveta Helena mainline toll plaza have no toll plazas, as that part of the A4 route is not tolled. The same applies to the northernmost section between the Goričan exit and the Hungarian border.

A motorway connecting Zagreb to Varaždin and Budapest was proposed in the early 1970s, but unlike the Zagreb–Rijeka or Zagreb–Belgrade motorways, no construction was actually carried out. The first section of the road, later designated as the A4 motorway, was developed as a 6-kilometre (3.7 mi) two-lane road to serve as an interchange ramp in Ivanja Reka. The majority of the entire motorway was built between 1997 and 2003, leaving only a 1.6-kilometre (0.99 mi) section between the Goričan interchange and the Goričan–Letenye border crossing left to build. The section was fully completed on October 22, 2008. In 1998, construction costs were estimated at 850 million German marks (€434.5 million). Although a 32-year concession for development of the motorway was awarded to Transeuropska Autocesta d.d. (TEA) in 1997, Hrvatske autoceste took over development, maintenance and management of the route in 2000 when the concession was cancelled, leading to a dispute with Astaldi, the majority owner of TEA.

== Route description ==
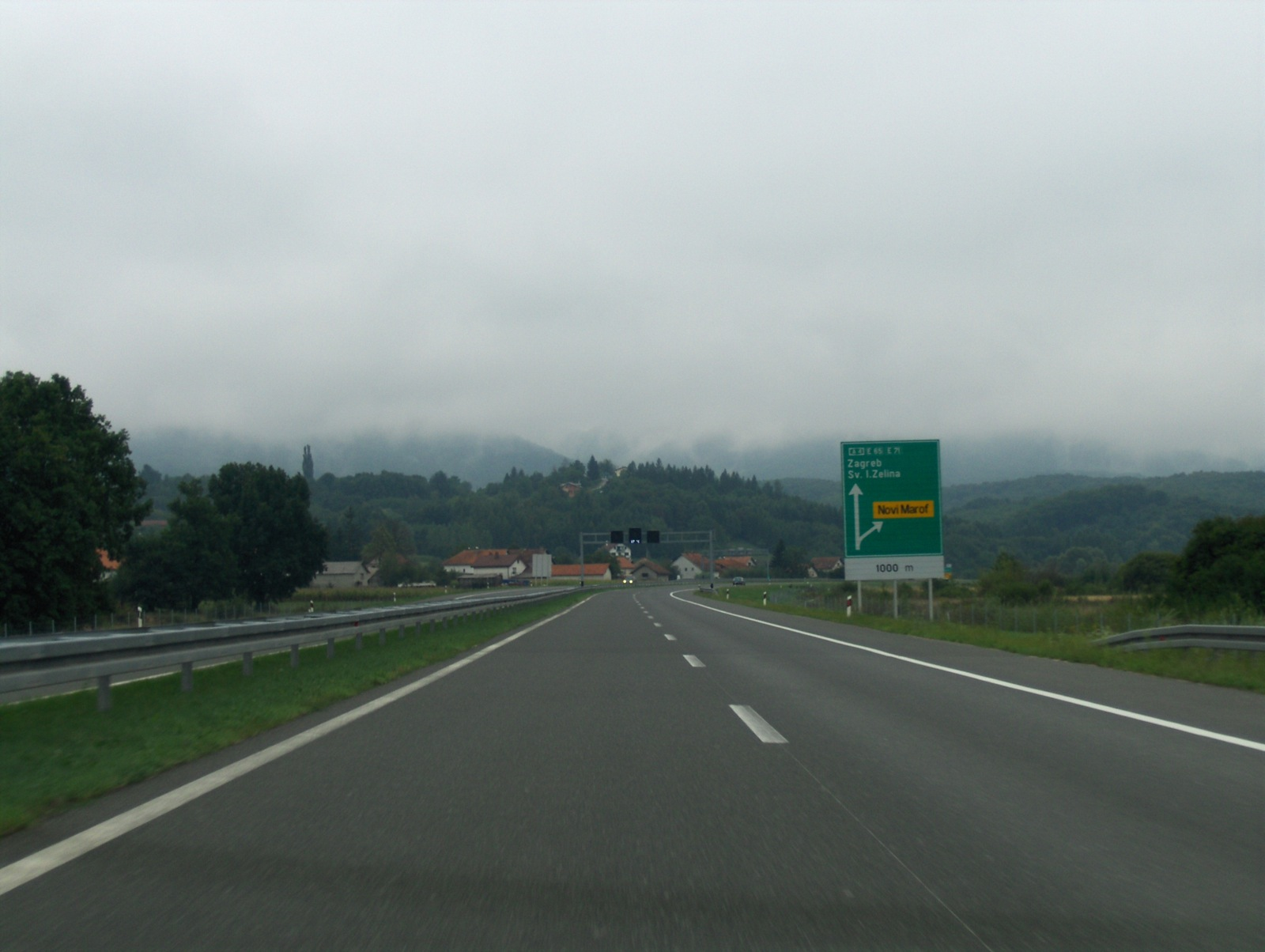
The A4 route near Novi Marof

The A4 motorway is a significant north–south motorway in the northern Croatia connecting the nation's capital, Zagreb, to the Hungarian M7 motorway at the Goričan border crossing The southern terminus of the A4 motorway at the interchange in Ivanja Reka represents its junction with the rest of the Croatian motorway network via the A3 motorway. As a part of the road network of Croatia, the motorway is a part of European route E65 and European route E71. The motorway is of major importance to Croatia in terms of the development of its economy, notably tourism, as it represents the shortest and the most comfortable route between Budapest, Hungary and the Adriatic Sea. This particularly applies to tourist resorts on the Istria and Kvarner Gulf islands and to the Port of Rijeka, but it is also true for resorts in the Dalmatia region, served via the A1 motorway. The genuine importance of the motorway as a transit route will be demonstrated upon completion of the proposed expansion of the Port of Rijeka and Rijeka transport node. This expansion is planned to encompass the growth of the Port of Rijeka's cargo handling capacity, improved railroad links and a new Rijeka bypass motorway linking the A6, via a new interchange, to the present routes of the A7 and A8 motorways. The project is, among other goals, aimed to increase traffic along the Croatian part of Pan-European corridor Vb, of which the A4 motorway is a part.

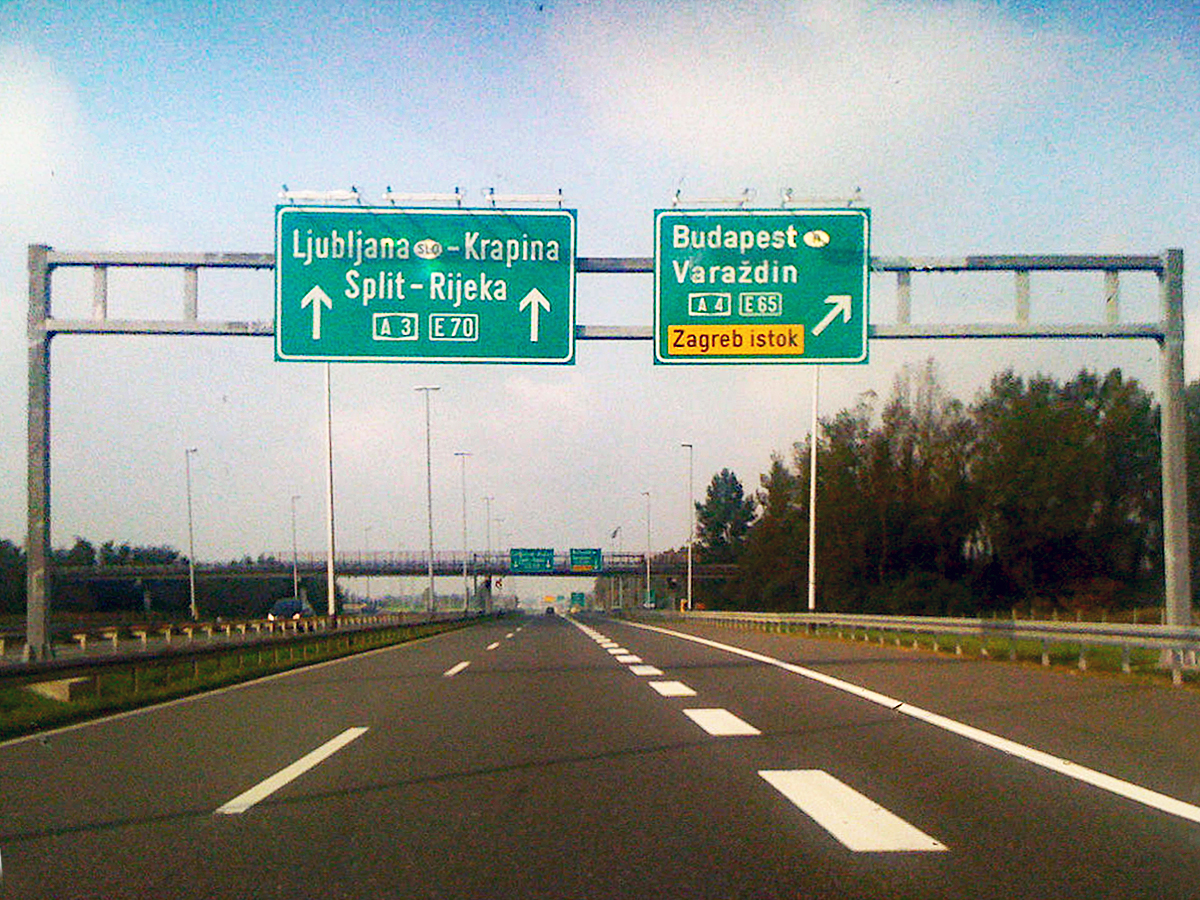
Ivanja Reka interchange, westbound approach along the A3

The motorway spans 97.0 kilometres (60.3 mi) between the Goričan border crossing to Hungary and Zagreb–Ivanja Reka interchange on the A3 motorway. Among other cities and towns, it connects to Čakovec via the D20, Ludbreg and Koprivnica via the D530 and D2, Varaždin via the D528, Novi Marof via the D22, Vrbovec and Križevci via the D10 state roads and Dugo Selo via the Ž3034 county road. Future development of the motorway will include additional rest areas and a possible expansion of interchanges. The A4 motorway consists of two traffic lanes and an emergency lane in each driving direction along its entire length, except in tunnels where there are emergency bays instead. All existing interchanges are trumpet interchanges, except in Ivanja Reka, which is a modified cloverleaf. There is a number of rest areas along the motorway, providing various types of services ranging from parking spaces and restrooms to filling stations and restaurants. As of October 2010, the motorway has 12 interchanges, providing access to numerous towns and cities and the Croatian state road network. The A4 motorway is concurrent with the D3 state road between the Komin and Ivanja Reka interchanges, although the D3 is not signposted along that section. The motorway is operated by Hrvatske autoceste.

An automatic traffic monitoring and guidance system is in place along the motorway. It consists of measuring, control and signaling devices, located in zones where driving conditions may vary—at interchanges, near viaducts, bridges, tunnels and in zones where fog and strong winds are known to occur. The system consists of variable traffic signs used to communicate changing driving conditions, possible restrictions and other information to motorway users.

The A4 motorway runs through hills and plains crossed by a number of watercourses, requiring a number of bridges, viaducts and tunnels along the route. Particular attention to the environment is also required, due to the several water supply and natural heritage zones.

== Toll ==
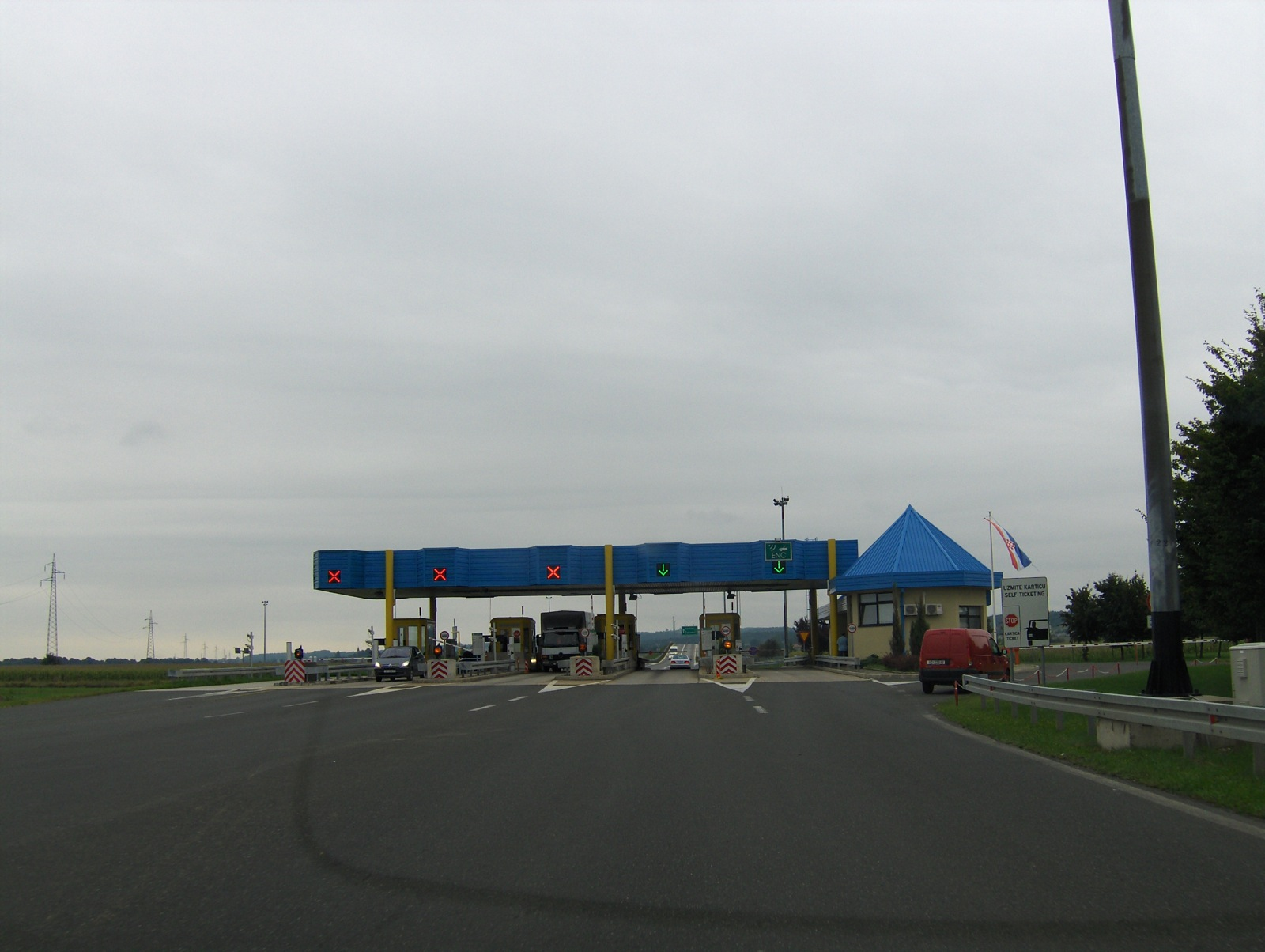
Varaždin exit toll plaza

The A4 is a tolled motorway based on the vehicle classification in Croatia using a closed toll system. As of October 2010, toll charged along the A4 route between the Sveta Helena and Goričan mainline toll plazas varies depending on the length of route travelled and ranges from 7.00 kuna (€0.96) to 36.00 kuna (€4.93) for passenger cars and 22.00 kuna (€3.01) to 120.00 kuna (€16.44) for semi-trailer trucks. The toll is payable in either Croatian kuna or euros using major credit cards, debit cards and a number of prepaid toll collection systems. The latter includes various types of smart cards issued by the motorway operator and ENC, an electronic toll collection (ETC) system which is shared at most motorways in Croatia and provides drivers with discounted toll rates for dedicated lanes at toll plazas. The northernmost section of the motorway, between the border and Goričan interchange (inclusive) is not tolled. Similarly, the southernmost part of the A4 motorway route, located between Sveta Helena and Ivanja Reka interchanges (inclusive) is also toll-free, as it is a part of the Zagreb bypass, which services a significant volume of traffic.

== Notable structures ==
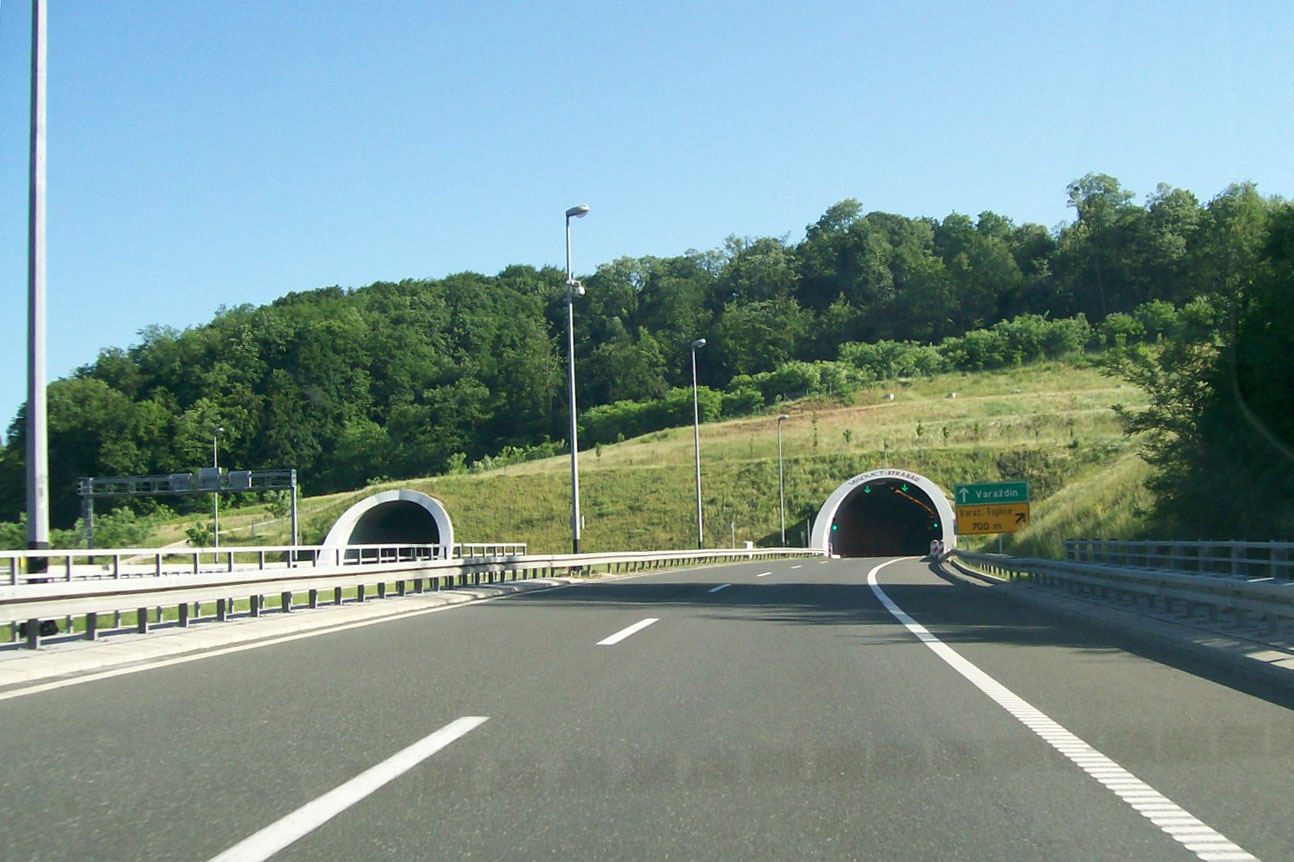
Hrastovec Tunnel

The A4 motorway Varaždin–Breznički Hum section route runs through hilly landscape requiring a number of viaducts and tunnels, especially along the Breznički Hum–Novi Marof section and around the Varaždinske Toplice exit. Each comprises four traffic lanes, while the viaducts have emergency lanes. Two most notable structures are the Hrastovec and Vrtlinovec tunnels, located to the south and north of the exit, respectively. Both of the tunnels consist of two tubes each, and each of them carry two traffic lanes. The Hrastovec Tunnel tubes are unequal in length, as the southbound tube is 498 metres (1,634 ft) long, while the northbound tube is 523 metres (1,716 ft) long. The Vrtlinovec Tunnel southbound tube is 628 metres (2,060 ft) long and its northbound tube is 522 metres (1,713 ft) long, earning the distinction of being the longest tunnel on the A4 route. There are two major bridges on the A4 motorway, both of them located north of Varaždin. The longest one is the Drava Bridge, carrying the motorway across the Drava River, measuring 507.7 metres (1,666 ft) long. There is also the Zrinski Bridge, carrying the A4 motorway across Mur River and across the Croatia–Hungary border, thus representing the northern terminus of the motorway, where northbound A4 traffic defaults to the Hungarian M7 motorway towards Nagykanizsa and Budapest. The 216-metre (709 ft) Zrinski Bridge was the final structure completed on the route. Both the Drava and Mura bridges carry six motorway lanes.

== History ==
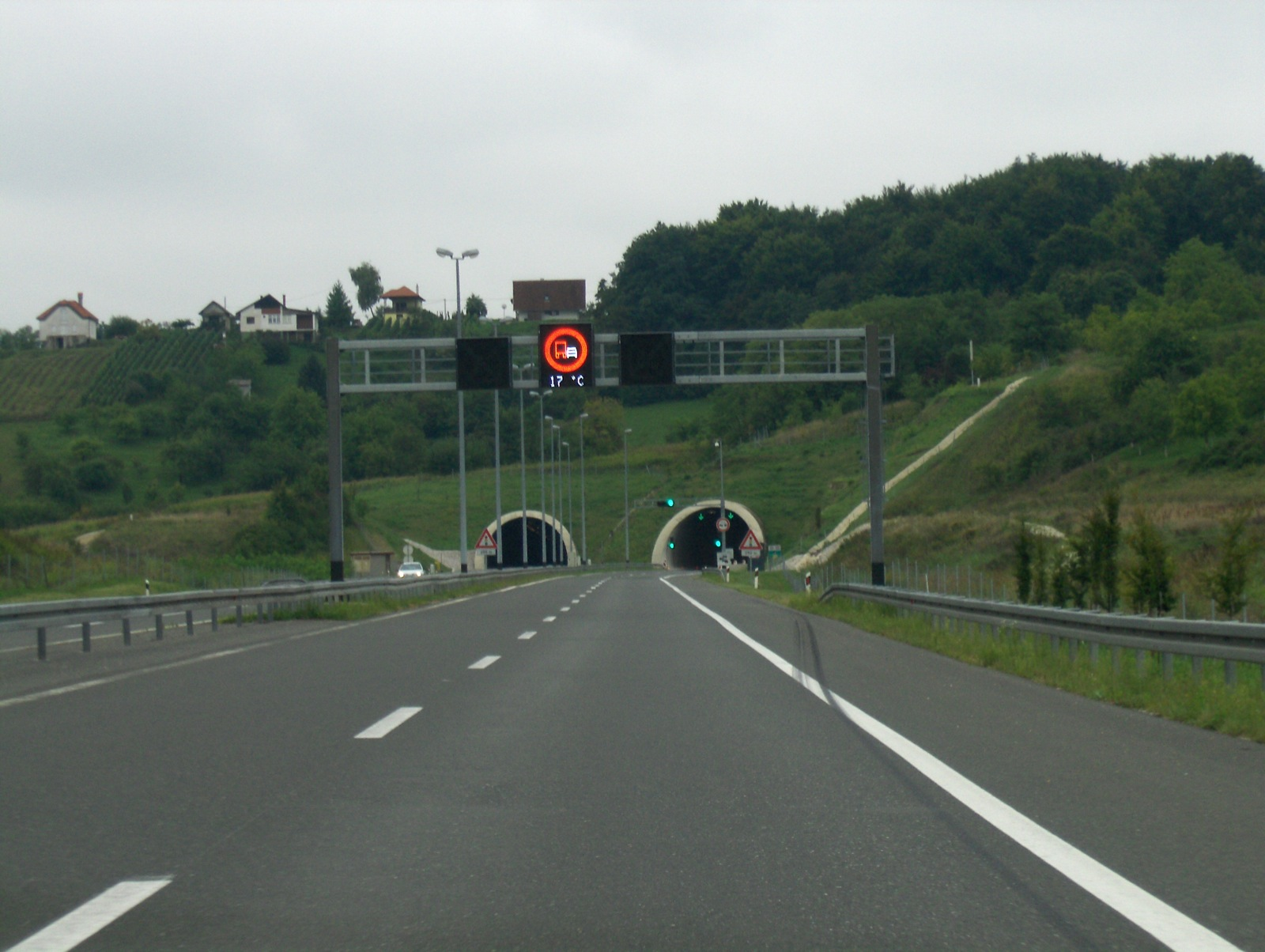
Variable traffic signs ahead of Vrtlinovec Tunnel

A motorway connecting Zagreb to Varaždin and Budapest was proposed in the early 1970s, but unlike the Zagreb–Rijeka and Zagreb–Belgrade motorways, no construction was carried out. Although the first section of the route, now designated as the A4 motorway, was completed in 1980, development for the motorway was proposed once again in 1991 to facilitate links between the Varaždin area, Zagreb and the remainder of the Croatian motorway network. The route was added to the network of Pan-European transport corridors in June 1997, during the third Pan-European Transport Conference in Helsinki, and on August 7, 1997, the government of the Republic of Croatia decided to establish the Autocesta Rijeka–Zagreb–Goričan company and award it a 28-year concession to develop, operate and maintain the route as a six-lane motorway. The route consisted of the entire Croatian section of the Pan-European corridor Vb except for 20.8-kilometre (12.9 mi) of the Lučko–Ivanja Reka section of the A3 motorway, which was already in use as a part of Zagreb bypass.

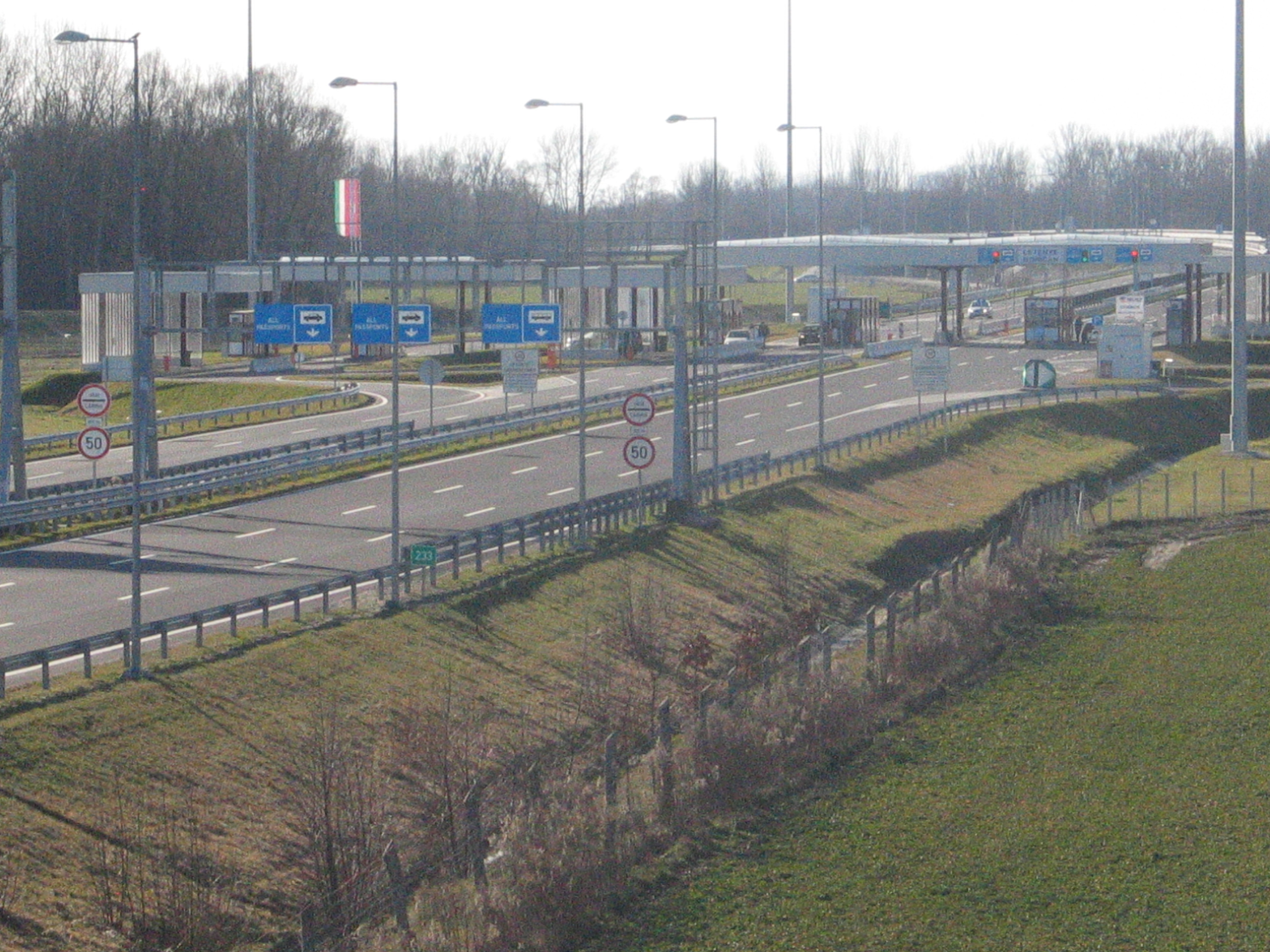
Letenye-Goričan border crossing, Hungarian side of the border

Later that same year, on May 14, 1998, the government signed an agreement with Astaldi, regulating construction of the Zagreb Goričan motorway by 2000. On December 11, 1997, pursuant to the agreement, the government established the Autocesta Rijeka–Zagreb company to take the place of the Autocesta Rijeka–Zagreb–Goričan company, and awarded it the 28-year concession to develop, maintain and operate the Zagreb–Rijeka motorway, effectively excluding the Zagreb–Goričan motorway from the original concession. At the same time, the Transeuropska autocesta d.o.o. (TEA) company was established by the government and awarded concession for development, operation and maintenance of the Zagreb–Goričan motorway. Astaldi owned 51% of TEA, with the remainder owned by the Republic of Croatia. TEA was to secure financing of the project in 1998. Construction began as scheduled; however, financial and legal problems ensued, and by 1999, the press speculated that Astaldi had given up the project, but Astaldi repeatedly denied these claims. Ultimately, the government cancelled the contract and ceded the motorway to Croatian Roads Administration (ancestor of Hrvatske autoceste and Hrvatske ceste), leading Astaldi to turn to the commercial arbitration court in Vienna, which ruled in its favour. The Republic of Croatia was subsequently required to pay Astaldi 44.3 million euro in damages.

In 1980, the 6-kilometre (3.7 mi) Popovec–Ivanja Reka section was the first part of the A4 motorway to be built, as a semi-motorway, for the new Ivanja Reka interchange on the motorway, later designated A3. The first section completed was the 16-kilometre (9.9 mi) Goričan–Čakovec section, opened to traffic in 1997, followed by the 22.4-kilometre (13.9 mi) Komin–Popovec and the 15.58-kilometre (9.68 mi) Čakovec–Varaždin sections, completed in 1998. In 2000, the 12.3-kilometre (7.6 mi) Breznički Hum–Komin section was finished, and in 2003, the motorway route was nearly completed as the 23.25-kilometre (14.45 mi) Varaždin–Breznički Hum section and the second carriageway in the Popovec–Ivanja Reka section were built. The final 1.6-kilometre (0.99 mi) section between the Goričan exit and the Hungarian border opened on October 22, 2008, the same day the final section of the A6 motorway was finalised, marking completion of the Budapest–Zagreb–Rijeka motorway.

== Road incidents ==
- 6 August 2022 - A bus crash killed 12 people.

== Traffic volume ==
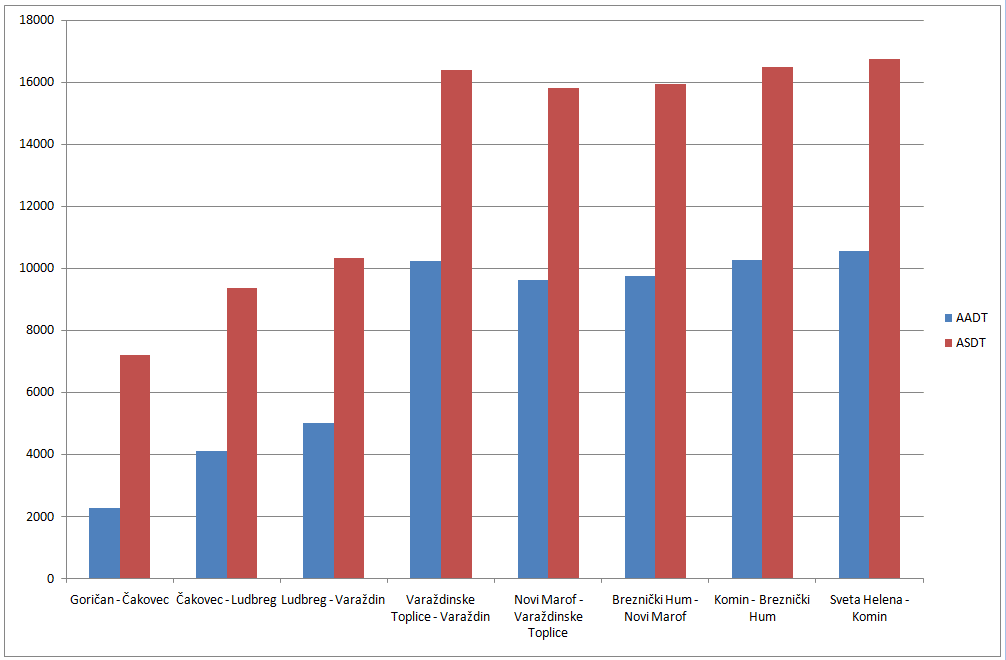
2009 A4 traffic volume by section

Traffic is regularly counted and reported by Hrvatske autoceste, operator of the motorway, and results are published by Hrvatske ceste. The largest annual average daily traffic (AADT) volume is often recorded in the Sveta Helena–Komin section, although all sections between Sveta Helena and Varaždin display similar AADT. AADT data for sections north of Varaždin show considerable drops in traffic volume. As the motorway traffic volume is measured through analysis of toll ticket sales, the southernmost section of the motorway, Ivanja Reka–Sveta Helena, is not included in the report. However, since the section is a part of the Zagreb bypass, it carries significantly heavier traffic than any other sections of the A4 motorway—in 2004, traffic volume along the toll-free section of the A4 motorway was approximately 24,000 vehicles per day (AADT) between the Kraljevečki Novaki and Sveta Helena interchanges and nearly 41,000 vehicles per day between the Kraljevečki Novaki and Ivanja Reka interchanges. Traffic volume measured on the Ivanja Reka–Ivanić Grad section of the A3 motorway increased by 30%, hinting at a similar increase in traffic volume on the A4 route south of Sveta Helena.

Variations between AADT and average summer daily traffic (ASDT) traffic volumes are attributed to the fact that the motorway carries substantial tourist traffic to the Adriatic Sea resorts.

A4 traffic volume details
Road	Counting site	AADT	ASDT	Notes
A4	1303 Čakovec north	2,687	8,841	Between Goričan and Čakovec interchanges.
A4	1306 Ludbreg north	4,308	10,829	Between Čakovec and Ludbreg interchanges.
A4	1212 Varaždin north	5,220	11,874	Between Varaždin and Ludbreg interchanges.
A4	1215 Varaždinske Toplice north	9,800	17,041	Between Varaždinske Toplice and Varaždin interchanges.
A4	1220 Novi Marof north	9,089	16,365	Between Novi Marof and Varaždinske Toplice interchanges.
A4	1225 Breznički Hum north	9,232	16,526	Between Breznički Hum and Novi Marof interchanges.
A4	1229 Komin north	9,642	16,934	Between Komin and Breznički Hum interchanges.
A4	2002 Sveta Helena north	9,988	17,220	Between Sveta Helena and Komin interchanges.

== Rest areas ==
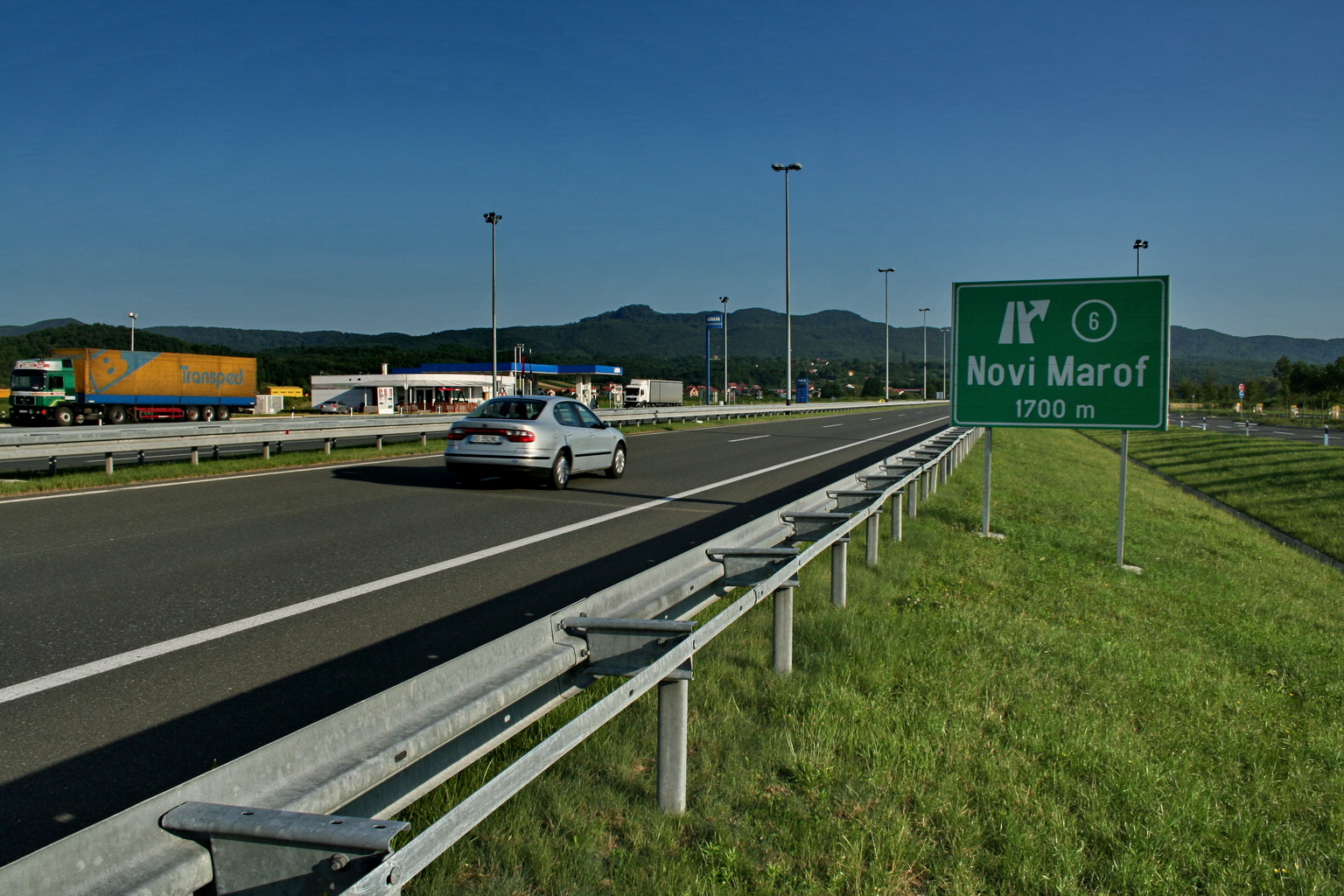
Ljubešćica rest area

As of October 2010, there are three rest areas along the A4 motorway. Legislation identifies four types of rest areas designated as types A through D: A-type rest areas comprise a full range of amenities, including a filling station, a restaurant and a hotel or motel; B-type rest areas have no lodging; C-type rest areas are very common and include a filling station and a café, but no restaurants or accommodations; D-type rest areas only offer parking spaces, possibly picnicking tables and benches, and restrooms. Even though rest areas found along the A4 motorway generally follow this ranking system, there are considerable variations, as some of them offer extra services. The filling stations regularly have small convenience stores, and some of them may offer LPG fuel.

The primary motorway operator, Hrvatske autoceste (HAC), leases the A, B and C type rest areas to various operators through public tenders. As of October 2010, there are two such rest area operators on the A4 motorway: INA and Crodux. The rest area operators are not permitted to sub-lease the fuel operations. The A4 motorway rest areas are accessible from both directions of the motorway and operate 24 hours a day, 7 days a week.

List of A4 motorway rest areas
County	km	Name	Operators	Notes
Varaždin	26.9	Drava	HAC	Facilities found at Varaždin rest area comprise parking area only.
Varaždin	44.7	Ljubešćica	INA	Facilities found at Ljubešćica rest area comprise a filling station selling petrol and diesel fuel, a café and restrooms.
City of Zagreb	86.3	Sesvete	Crodux; McDonald's	Facilities found at Sesvete rest area comprise a filling station selling petrol and diesel fuel, a restaurant, a café and restrooms.
1.000 mi = 1.609 km; 1.000 km = 0.621 mi

== Exit list ==
County	km	Exit	Name	Destination	Notes
Međimurje	0.0	Border crossing within the EU	Goričan border crossing	M7 E65 E71	Goričan border crossing to Hungary; The motorway extends as Hungarian M7 motorway towards Nagykanizsa and Budapest. The northern terminus of European routes E65/E71 concurrency The northern terminus of the motorway
Međimurje	1.3	1	GP Goričan	D3	Connection to Goričan border crossing to Hungary
Međimurje	2.8	2	Goričan	D3	Connection to Goričan
Međimurje	4.7	Toll plaza traffic sign	Goričan toll plaza		
Međimurje	16.9	3	Čakovec	D20	Connection to Čakovec and Prelog
Varaždin	23.1	Drava River Bridge			
Varaždin	25.0	4	Ludbreg	D530	Connection to Varaždin and Lubreg via D2 state road
Varaždin	26.9	Rest area traffic sign	Drava rest area		
Varaždin	32.7	5	Varaždin	D528	Connection to Varaždin via D3 state road and to D2 state road junction west of Varaždin
Varaždin	36.9	Vrtlinovec Tunnel			
Varaždin	38.6	6	Varaždinske Toplice	D526	Connection to Varaždinske Toplice and to D24 state road
Varaždin	39.2	Hrastovec Tunnel			
Varaždin	44.7	Rest area traffic sign	Ljubešćica rest area		
Varaždin	47.0	7	Novi Marof	D24 D22	Connection to Novi Marof and Križevci via D22 state road
Varaždin	56.6	8	Breznički Hum	D3	Connection to Breznički Hum
Zagreb County	68.8	9	Komin	D3	Connection to Komin
Zagreb County	77.2	Toll plaza traffic sign	Sveta Helena toll plaza		
Zagreb County	79.2	10	Sveta Helena	D10 Ž3016	Connection to Vrbovec and Križevci via D10 expressway. Connection to Rakovec, Sveta Helena and Donja Zelina (D3) (via the Ž3016); The eastern terminus of Zagreb bypass.
City of Zagreb	86.3	Rest area traffic sign	Sesvete rest area		
City of Zagreb	90.4	11	Popovec	D3	Connection to Popovec and Soblinec (D29); The northern terminus of concurrency of the A4 motorway and the D3 state road.
City of Zagreb	93.6	12	Sesvete	Ž3034	Connection to Sesvete and Kraljevečki Novaki, Dugo Selo
Zagreb County	96.4	13	Zagreb istok	A3 E65 E70 E71	Connection to Zagreb via Slavonska Avenue, Slavonski Brod (eastbound A3) as well as A11, A1, A2 motorways, southern and western Zagreb bypass exits, Samobor and Slovenia (westbound A3). The southern terminus of European routes E65/E71 concurrency The southern terminus of D3 state road concurrency The southern terminus of the motorway. Southbound A4 traffic defaults to westbound A3 motorway.
1.000 mi = 1.609 km; 1.000 km = 0.621 mi: Concurrency terminus

== See also ==
- International E-road network
- Transport in Croatia
