= Bolfan =

Coordinates: 46°13′N 16°41′E

- Village
- Interactive map of Bolfan
- Country: Croatia
- County: Varaždin County
- Municipality: Ludbreg

Area
  - Total: 8.8 km^{2} (3.4 sq mi)

Population (2021)
  - Total: 362
  - Density: 41/km^{2} (110/sq mi)
- Time zone: UTC+1 (CET)
  - Summer (DST): UTC+2 (CEST)

Bolfan is a village in the Ludberg municipality, Varaždin County, in Croatia. It is connected by the D2 highway.
