= Vinogradi Ludbreški =

Settlement in Varaždin County, Croatia

- Settlement
- Interactive map of Vinogradi Ludbreški
- Location of Vinogradi Ludbreški in Croatia
- Coordinates: 46°13′59″N 16°37′41″E
- Country: Croatia
- County: Varaždin County
- City: Ludbreg

Area
  - Total: 19.6 km^{2} (7.6 sq mi)

Population (2021)
  - Total: 679
  - Density: 34.6/km^{2} (89.7/sq mi)
- Time zone: UTC+1 (CET)
  - Summer (DST): UTC+2 (CEST)
- Postal code: 42230 Ludbreg
- Area code: +385 (0)42

Vinogradi Ludbreški is a settlement in the City of Ludbreg in Croatia. In 2021, its population was 679.

== Demographics ==
Vinogradi Ludbreški: Population trends 1857–2021
v

| population | | | | | | | | | 658 | 629 | 599 | 476 | 448 | 480 | 564 | 648 | 679 |
| | 1857 | 1869 | 1880 | 1890 | 1900 | 1910 | 1921 | 1931 | 1948 | 1953 | 1961 | 1971 | 1981 | 1991 | 2001 | 2011 | 2021 |

Sources: Croatian Bureau of Statistics publications
