= Selnik =

Selnik may refer to:

- Selnik, North Macedonia, a village in the Municipality of Delčevo
- Selnik, Ig, a village in Slovenia
- Selnik, Ludbreg, a village near Ludbreg, Varaždin County, Croatia
- Selnik, Maruševec, a village near Maruševec, Varaždin County, Croatia
