= Slokovec =

Coordinates: 46°15′N 16°39′E

- Village
- Interactive map of Slokovec
- Country: Croatia
- County: Varaždin County
- Town: Ludbreg

Area
  - Total: 2.8 km^{2} (1.1 sq mi)

Population (2021)
  - Total: 227
  - Density: 81/km^{2} (210/sq mi)
- Time zone: UTC+1 (CET)
  - Summer (DST): UTC+2 (CEST)

Slokovec is a village in Croatia. The village lies in the Ludberg municipality, Varaždin County.
