= Bartolovec =

- Village
- Location of Bartolovec in Croatia
- Coordinates: 46°17′49″N 16°26′10″E
- Country: Croatia
- County: Varaždin County
- Municipality: Trnovec Bartolovečki

Area
  - Total: 4.7 km^{2} (1.8 sq mi)

Population (2021)
  - Total: 653
  - Density: 140/km^{2} (360/sq mi)
- Time zone: UTC+1 (CET)
  - Summer (DST): UTC+2 (CEST)
- Postal code: 42202 Trnovec Bartolovečki
- Area code: +385 (0)42

Bartolovec is a village in Varaždin County, Croatia.

The village is part of the Trnovec Bartolovečki municipality. It is located near Lake Varaždin, a reservoir on the Drava, around 6 kilometres east of the city of Varaždin. It is connected with the villages of Žabnik and Štefanec. In the 2011 census, Bartolovec had a population of 749.

The D2 state road goes through the village.
