= Gornji Kuršanec =

- Village
- Location within Croatia
- Coordinates: 46°19′41″N 16°21′36″E
- Country: Croatia
- County: Međimurje County
- Municipality: Nedelišće

Area
  - Total: 6.1 km^{2} (2.4 sq mi)

Population (2021)
  - Total: 797
  - Density: 130/km^{2} (340/sq mi)
- Time zone: UTC+1 (CET)
  - Summer (DST): UTC+2 (CEST)
- Postal code: 40305 Nedelišće

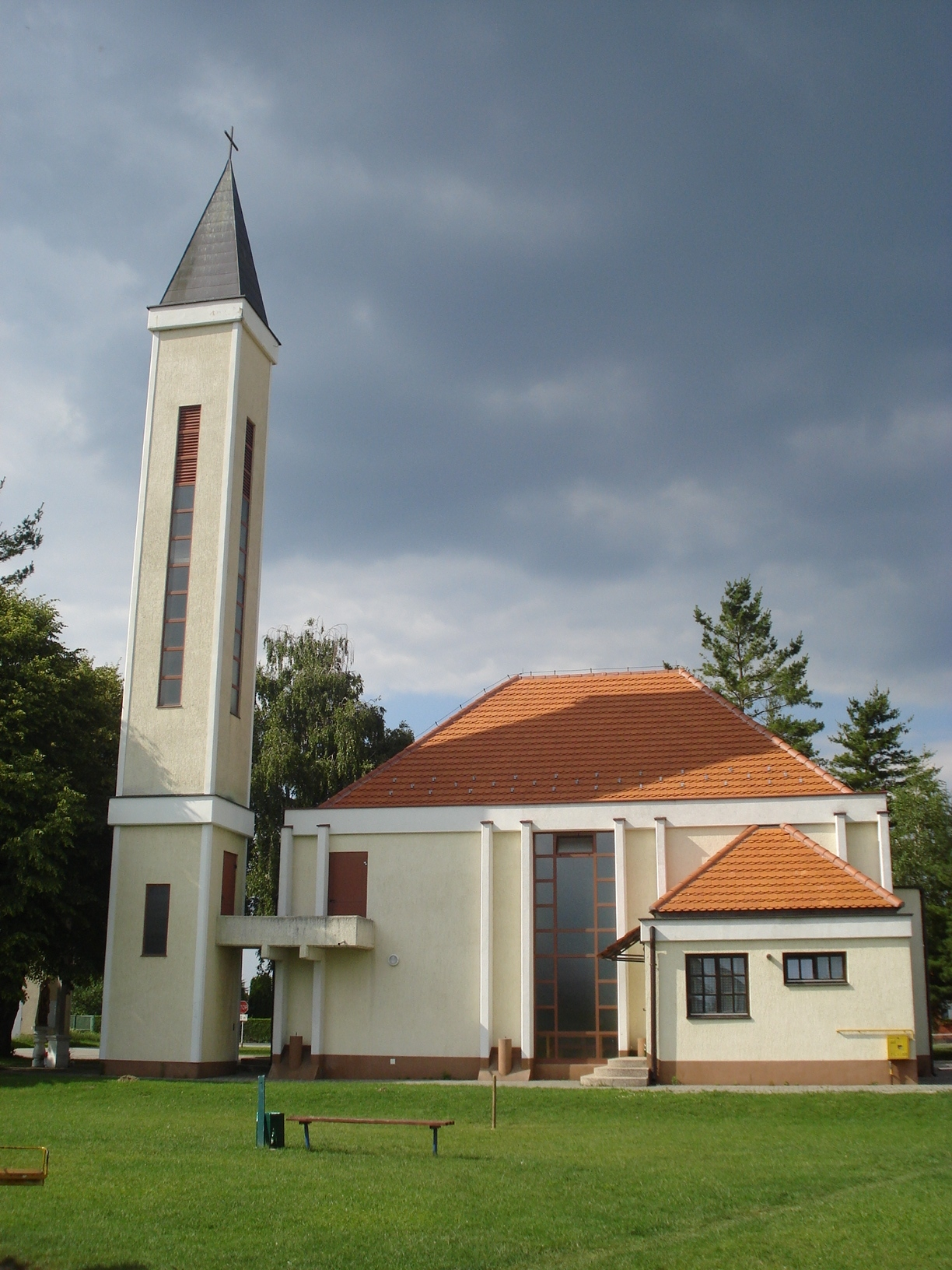
Church of the Assumption of the Blessed Virgin Mary in the village

Gornji Kuršanec (Hungarian: Felsőzrínyifalva) is a village in Međimurje County, Croatia. It is part of the municipality of Nedelišće and had a population of 793 in the 2011 census.

The village is located close to the Drava River and just over 3 kilometres from the centre of Varaždin, the county seat of Varaždin County. The D3 state road goes through the village, providing the main traffic connection between Varaždin and Čakovec, the county seat of Međimurje County. The railroad between the two cities also goes through the village.

Also close to the village is Lake Varaždin, a reservoir lake on the Drava River. The area of the lake that is close to Gornji Kuršanec is a popular summer weekend destination for many people from the region, with many log cabins built on the shores of both the lake and the river, which flows into it nearby.
