= Rudolf Fizir =

Croatian aircraft designer (1891–1960)

Rudolf Fizir (13 January 1891 – 11 November 1960) was an airplane constructor. He designed at least 18 original planes, some conversions of landplanes to seaplanes - and a parachute.

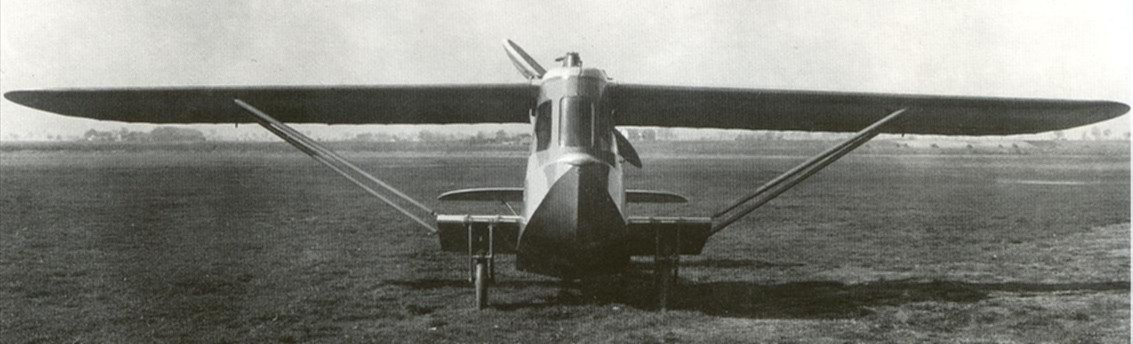
The amphibious Fizir A.F.2 from 1931

Fizir was born in Ludbreg, a small town on the river Bednja, in the north of Croatia. In 1914, whilst still a senior student, he was offered his first job in Schwerin, where he worked in the construction of fighter aircraft for the German Fliegerkorps in the new Fokker-Flugzeugbau factory. From there he was sent to Budapest, in order to find and organize a Fokker subsidiary.

Between 1918 and 1920, Fizir was employed in the automobile industry, where he gathered experience with internal combustion engines. In 1920, he returned to Ludbreg, and then moved to Petrovaradin. There he started to build his aircraft designs in his yard, at his own expense.

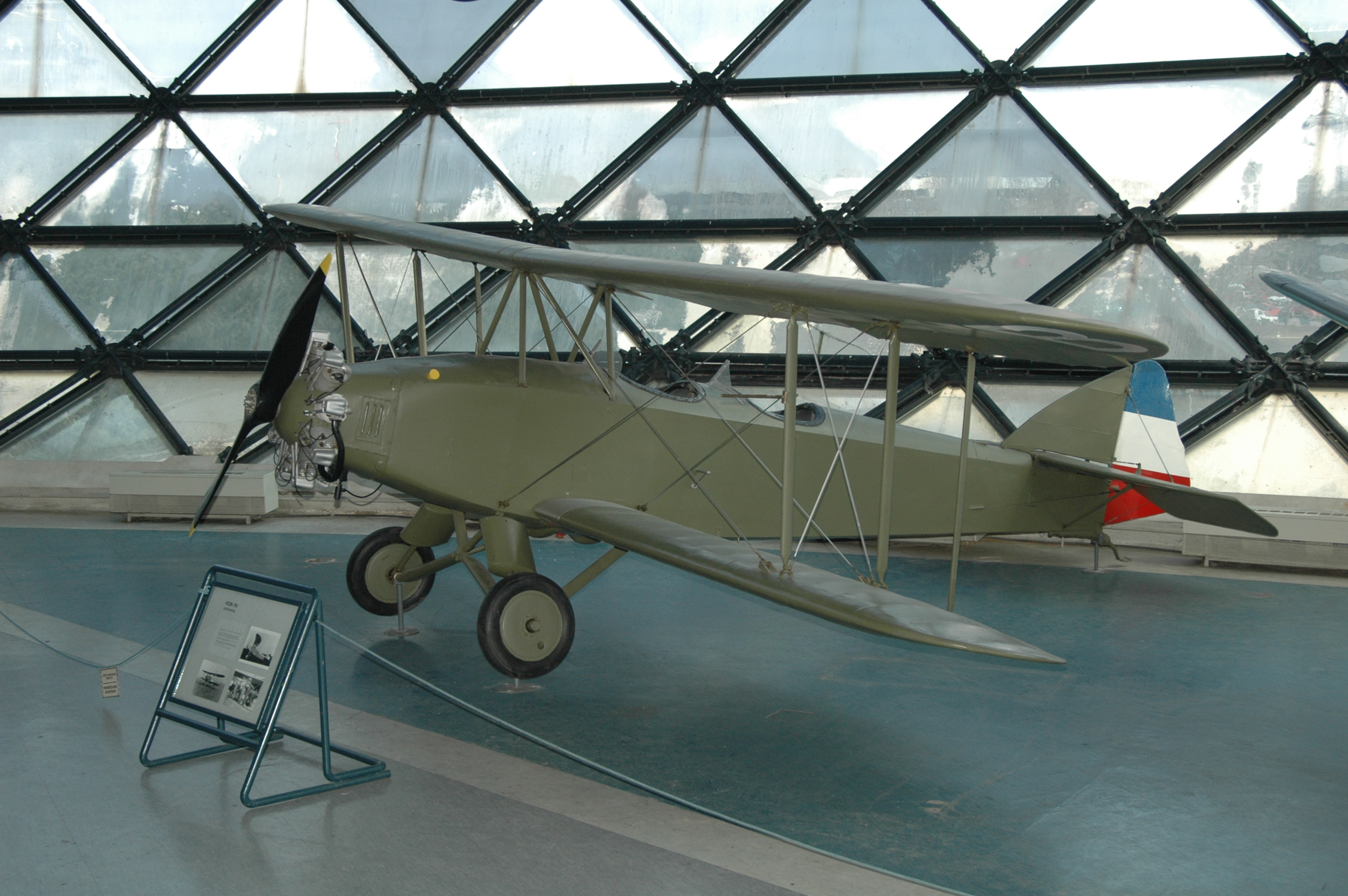
Fizir FN on display in the Museum of Aviation in Belgrade

With a biplane, which Fizir built in 1925, he won the first prize in the 1927 Little Entente contest, despite having an engine with only half the power of other competing designs. Other aircraft he produced were named after the engines used, such as the Fizir-Mercedes, Fizir-Wright, Fizir-Titan, Fizir-Kastor, Fizir-Gypsi, and the half-metallic Fizir-Jupiter. His successful designs, almost all wooden, were economic to produce, reflecting the low economic power of the pre-World War II Kingdom of Yugoslavia, wartime Croatia (Independent State of Croatia) and post-World War II Yugoslavia, and were highly regarded in Germany and France throughout the 1930s, 40s and 50s. He had a strong affiliation for trainers and seaplanes, having a vision of connecting the Adriatic islands with a regular seaplane service.

His greatest success was the Fizir FN two-seater with dual controls, over 100 of which were built, which was in use as a trainer up to 30 years after World War II. Rudolf Fizir was awarded with the Paul Tissandier Diploma from the Fédération Aéronautique Internationale for achievements in aviation, and held the rank of pukovnik (colonel) in the Croatian Battle Air Force. After World War II, Fizir worked as a motorcycle designer, and continued with aircraft construction in his retirement years.

The road leading to Zagreb Airport was named in his honour.
