= Hrastovsko =

Settlement in Varaždin County, Croatia

- Settlement
- Interactive map of Hrastovsko
- Location of Hrastovsko in Croatia
- Coordinates: 46°14′38″N 16°34′26″E
- Country: Croatia
- County: Varaždin County
- City: Ludbreg

Area
  - Total: 4.7 km^{2} (1.8 sq mi)

Population (2021)
  - Total: 674
  - Density: 140/km^{2} (370/sq mi)
- Time zone: UTC+1 (CET)
  - Summer (DST): UTC+2 (CEST)
- Postal code: 42230 Ludbreg
- Area code: +385 (0)42

Hrastovsko is a settlement in the City of Ludbreg in Croatia. In 2021, its population was 674.

== Demographics ==
Hrastovsko: Population trends 1857–2021
v

| population | 475 | 537 | 590 | 704 | 738 | 760 | 702 | 811 | 845 | 847 | 812 | 816 | 792 | 805 | 812 | 760 | 674 |
| | 1857 | 1869 | 1880 | 1890 | 1900 | 1910 | 1921 | 1931 | 1948 | 1953 | 1961 | 1971 | 1981 | 1991 | 2001 | 2011 | 2021 |

Sources: Croatian Bureau of Statistics publications
