= Kućan Ludbreški =

- Village
- Location of Kućan Ludbreški in Croatia
- Coordinates: 46°14′42″N 16°36′02″E
- Country: Croatia
- County: Varaždin County
- Town: Ludbreg

Area
  - Total: 0.9 km^{2} (0.35 sq mi)

Population (2021)
  - Total: 160
  - Density: 180/km^{2} (460/sq mi)
- Time zone: UTC+1 (CET)
  - Summer (DST): UTC+2 (CEST)
- Postal code: 42230 Ludbreg
- Area code: +385 (0)42

Kućan Ludbreški is a village in the Ludberg municipality, in Croatia's Varaždin County. It is connected by the D24 highway.
