= Segovina =

Settlement in Varaždin County, Croatia

- Settlement
- Interactive map of Segovina
- Location of Segovina in Croatia
- Coordinates: 46°12′22″N 16°38′38″E
- Country: Croatia
- County: Varaždin County
- City: Ludbreg

Area
  - Total: 5.8 km^{2} (2.2 sq mi)

Population (2021)
  - Total: 41
  - Density: 7.1/km^{2} (18/sq mi)
- Time zone: UTC+1 (CET)
  - Summer (DST): UTC+2 (CEST)
- Postal code: 42230 Ludbreg
- Area code: +385 (0)42

Segovina is a settlement in the City of Ludbreg in Croatia. In 2021, its population was 41.

== Demographics ==
Segovina: Population trends 1857–2021
v

population	172	198	189	152	172	199	169	145	132	126	119	107	81	69	51	37	41
	1857	1869	1880	1890	1900	1910	1921	1931	1948	1953	1961	1971	1981	1991	2001	2011	2021

Sources: Croatian Bureau of Statistics publications
