= 2022 Croatian bus crash =

2022 road incident in Croatia

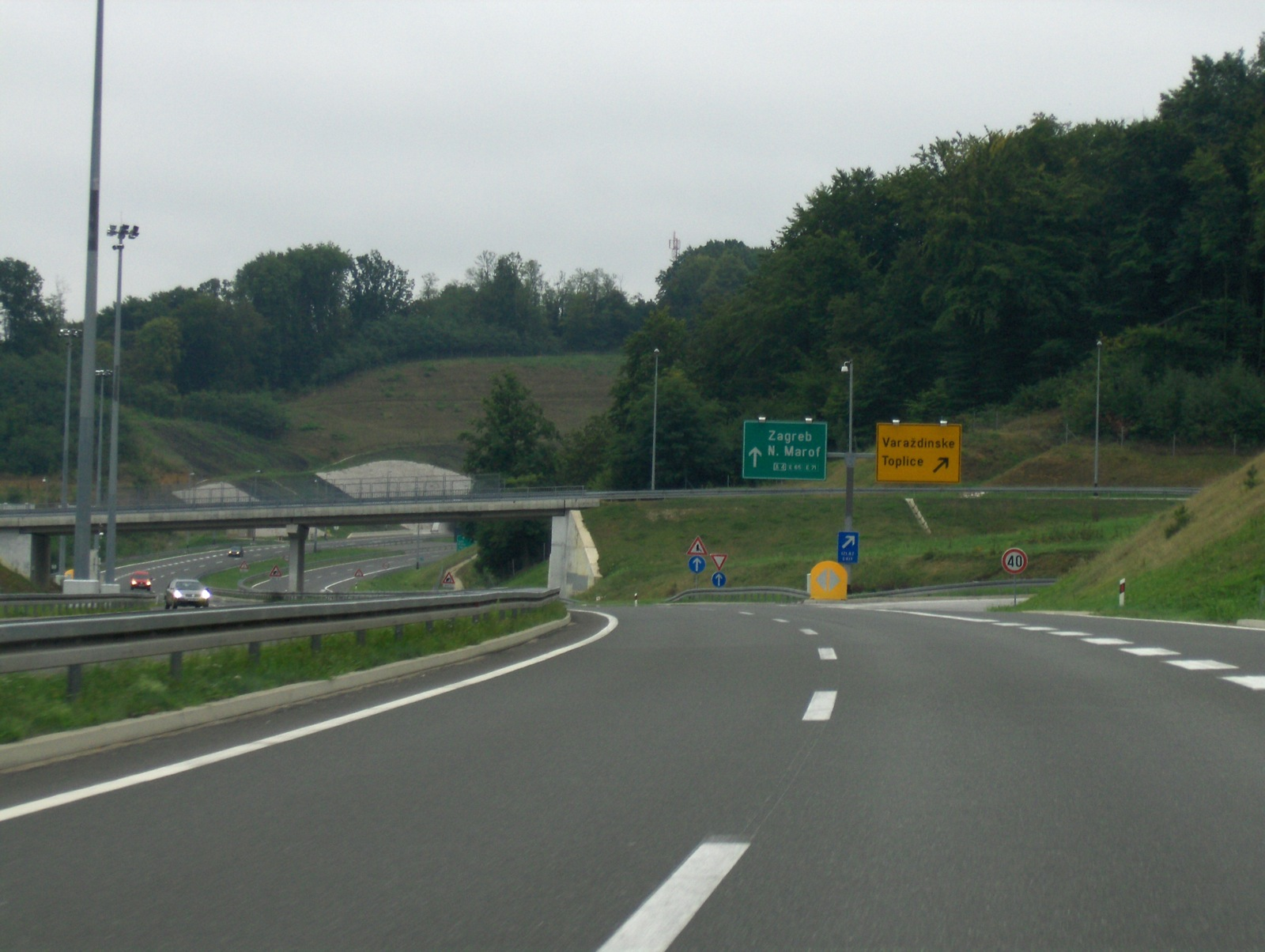
- The A4 highway exit at Varaždinske Toplice. The crash occurred along the road 13 miles from this exit.

Details
- Date: 6 August 2022
- Location: A4 highway near Breznički Hum
- Country: Croatia
- Incident type: Bus crash

Statistics
- Vehicles: 1
- Deaths: 12
- Injured: 32

On 6 August 2022, a bus crash in Croatia killed 12 people. It was the deadliest road incident in the country since 2008.

== Events ==
The bus left Częstochowa on 5 August, and was carrying Polish pilgrims of the Brotherhood of St Joseph Catholic group to a shrine in Medjugorje, Bosnia and Herzegovina. The bus veered off the road and crashed into a ditch. The crash occurred on the A4 highway near Breznički Hum. Twelve people were killed and 32 were injured. The official cause of the crash has yet to be determined. According to Croatian media, the driver fell asleep or fainted.

== Response ==
Polish Prime Minister Mateusz Morawiecki confirmed the tragedy. Prime Minister of Croatia Andrej Plenković tweeted his condolences to the victims.

== See also ==
- 2022 in Croatia
