= Sigetec Ludbreški =

- Village
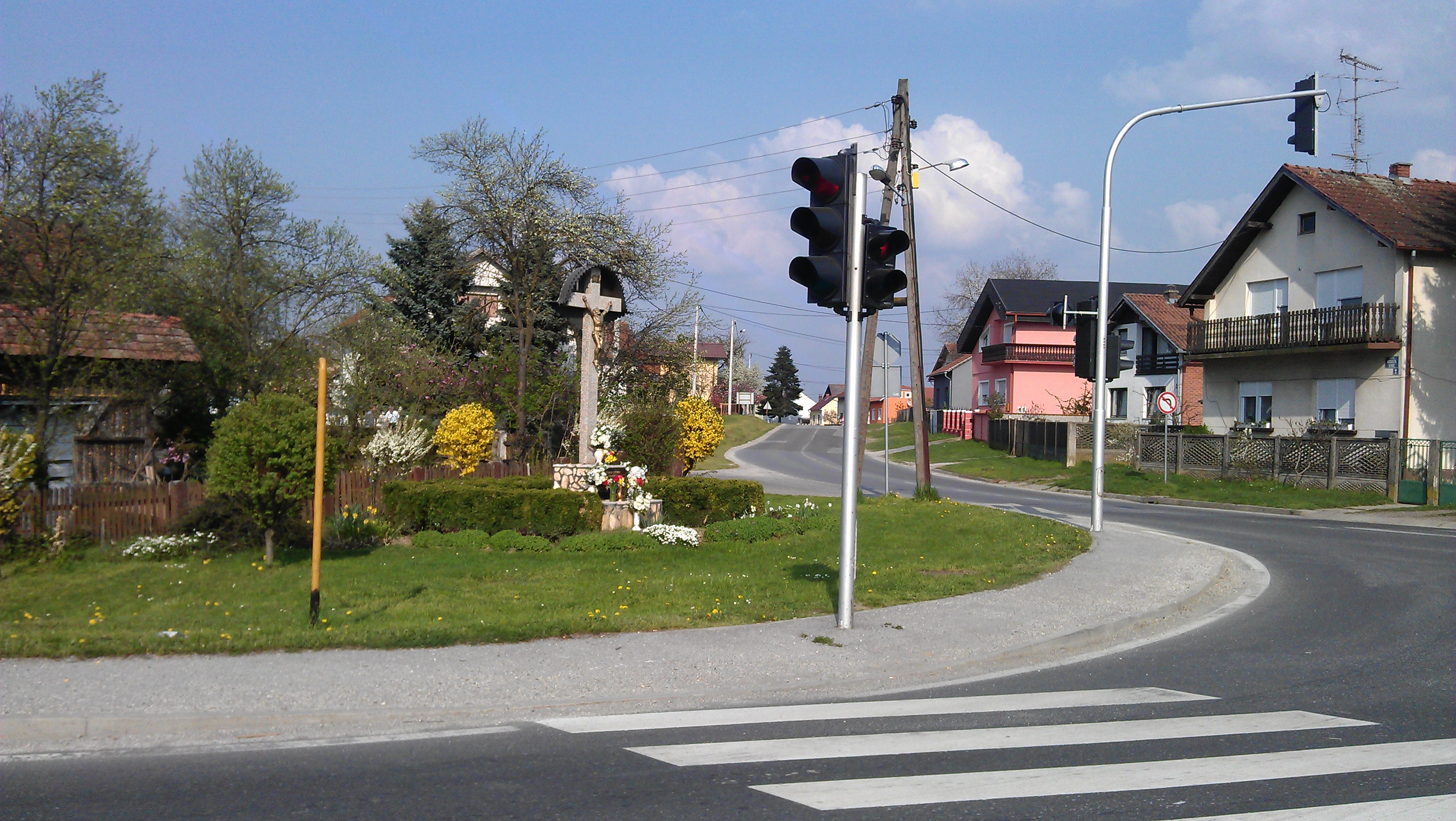

- Location of Sigetec Ludbreški in Croatia
- Coordinates: 46°16′N 16°38′E
- Country: Croatia
- County: Varaždin County
- Town: Ludbreg

Area
  - Total: 5.5 km^{2} (2.1 sq mi)

Population (2021)
  - Total: 596
  - Density: 110/km^{2} (280/sq mi)
- Time zone: UTC+1 (CET)
  - Summer (DST): UTC+2 (CEST)

Sigetec Ludbreški is a village in Croatia's Ludberg municipality, Varaždin County, It is connected by the D2 highway.
