= Trnovec Bartolovečki =

- Municipality
- Location of Trnovec Bartolovečki in Croatia
- Coordinates: 46°17′41″N 16°23′56″E
- Country: Croatia
- County: Varaždin County

Government
  - Municipal mayor: Verica Vitković

Area
  - Total: 38.7 km^{2} (14.9 sq mi)

Population (2021)
  - Total: 6,145
  - Density: 159/km^{2} (411/sq mi)
- Time zone: UTC+1 (CET)
  - Summer (DST): UTC+2 (CEST)
- Postal code: 42202 Trnovec Bartolovečki
- Area code: +385 (0)42
- Website: trnovec-bartolovecki.hr

Trnovec Bartolovečki is a municipality in Varaždin County, Croatia.

The total population of the municipality in the 2011 census was 6,884, in the following villages (settlements):

- Bartolovec, population 749
- Šemovec, population 916
- Štefanec, population 412
- Trnovec, population 4,185
- Zamlaka, population 445
- Žabnik, population 177

In the same census, over 99% the people living in the municipality were Croats.

The village of Trnovec is located around 6 kilometres from the centre of Varaždin, the county seat of Varaždin County. Varaždin Airport is located just outside the village. The entire municipality borders the shores of the Drava, especially Lake Varaždin, a reservoir built on the river.
