= Globočec Ludbreški =

- Village
- Location of Globočec Ludbreški in Croatia
- Coordinates: 46°14′10″N 16°38′38″E
- Country: Croatia
- County: Varaždin County
- Town: Ludbreg

Area
  - Total: 4.7 km^{2} (1.8 sq mi)

Population (2021)
  - Total: 418
  - Density: 89/km^{2} (230/sq mi)
- Time zone: UTC+1 (CET)
  - Summer (DST): UTC+2 (CEST)

Globočec Ludbreški is a village in the Ludberg municipality, Varaždin County, in Croatia. It is connected by the D2 highway.

== Notable people ==
- Antun Blažić - Croatian Partisan and People's Hero of Yugoslavia
