= Čukovec, Varaždin County =

Čukovec
- Village
- Interactive map of Čukovec
- Coordinates: 46°13′54″N 16°39′32″E
- Country: Croatia
- County: Varaždin County
- Town: Ludbreg

Area
  - Total: 4.2 km^{2} (1.6 sq mi)

Population (2021)
  - Total: 263
  - Density: 63/km^{2} (160/sq mi)
- Time zone: UTC+1 (CET)
  - Summer (DST): UTC+2 (CEST)

Čukovec is a village in the Ludberg municipality, Varaždin County, in Croatia. It is connected by the D2 highway.
