= Kraljevečki Novaki =

- Suburb
- Location within Croatia
- Coordinates: 45°50′N 16°09′E
- Country: Croatia
- County: City of Zagreb
- District: Sesvete
- Part of Sesvete since 1991
- Time zone: UTC+1 (CET)
  - Summer (DST): UTC+2 (CEST)

Kraljevečki Novaki is a former village that has been recorded as part of Sesvete, Croatia since 1991. The last census that recorded its population as a standalone settlement was in 1981, when it had 632 inhabitants.

It is connected by the D3 highway at the A4 interchange.
