= Selnik, Ludbreg =

Settlement in Varaždin County, Croatia

Selnik
- Settlement
- Interactive map of Selnik
- Location of Selnik in Croatia
- Coordinates: 46°16′01″N 16°36′25″E
- Country: Croatia
- County: Varaždin County
- City: Ludbreg

Area
  - Total: 5.4 km^{2} (2.1 sq mi)

Population (2021)
  - Total: 761
  - Density: 140/km^{2} (360/sq mi)
- Time zone: UTC+1 (CET)
  - Summer (DST): UTC+2 (CEST)
- Postal code: 42230 Ludbreg
- Area code: +385 (0)42

Selnik is a settlement in the City of Ludbreg in Croatia. In 2021, its population was 761.

== Demographics ==
Selnik: Population trends 1857–2021
v

population	334	386	452	555	622	618	648	692	848	832	832	792	853	900	905	844	761
	1857	1869	1880	1890	1900	1910	1921	1931	1948	1953	1961	1971	1981	1991	2001	2011	2021

Sources: Croatian Bureau of Statistics publications
