= Šemovec =

- Village
- Location of Šemovec in Croatia
- Coordinates: 46°18′N 16°28′E
- Country: Croatia
- County: Varaždin County
- Municipality: Trnovec Bartolovečki

Area
  - Total: 11.9 km^{2} (4.6 sq mi)

Population (2021)
  - Total: 825
  - Density: 69.3/km^{2} (180/sq mi)
- Time zone: UTC+1 (CET)
  - Summer (DST): UTC+2 (CEST)
- Postal code: 42202 Trnovec Bartolovečki
- Area code: +385 (0)42

Šemovec is a village in Varaždin County, Croatia.

The village is located near the Drava, around 10 kilometres east of Varaždin, and belongs to the Trnovec Bartolovečki municipality. Its population in the 2011 census was 916.

The D2 state road goes through the village, and there is also a portion of the A4 motorway passing through nearby, between Šemovec and Zamlaka.

Šemovec has one public elementary school.
