= Gland (disambiguation) =

A gland is an organ in an animal's body that synthesizes a substance for release.

Gland may also refer to:

== Geography ==
- Gland (Oise), a river in France, tributary of the Oise (river)
- Gland (Rhone), a river in France, tributary of the Rhône
- Gland, Aisne, a commune in the Aisne département, in France
- Gland, Switzerland, a town in Switzerland
- Gland, Yonne, a commune in the Yonne département, in France

== Science and technology ==
- Gland (botany), a secretory structure on a plant that produces a sticky, viscous substance
- Gland (engineering), a type of fluid seal allowing rotary or linear motion
- Cable gland, a device designed to attach and secure the end of a cable to the equipment

== See also ==
- List of glands of the human body
