= Apatija =

Settlement in Varaždin County, Croatia

- settlement
- Interactive map of Apatija
- Location within Croatia
- Coordinates: 46°15′14″N 16°40′05″E
- Country: Croatia
- County: Varaždin County
- City: Ludbreg

Area
  - Total: 2.2 km^{2} (0.85 sq mi)

Population (2021)
  - Total: 230
  - Density: 100/km^{2} (270/sq mi)
- Time zone: UTC+1 (CET)
  - Summer (DST): UTC+2 (CEST)
- Postal code: 42230 Ludbreg
- Area code: +385 (0)42

Apatija is a settlement in the City of Ludbreg in Croatia. In 2021, its population was 230.

== Demographics ==
Apatija: Population trends 1857–2021
v

population	192	232	272	318	330	345	373	416	410	398	369	385	348	329	287	250	230
	1857	1869	1880	1890	1900	1910	1921	1931	1948	1953	1961	1971	1981	1991	2001	2011	2021

Sources: Croatian Bureau of Statistics publications
