= Štefanec, Varaždin County =

Štefanec
- Village
- Location within Croatia
- Coordinates: 46°18′07″N 16°27′18″E
- Country: Croatia
- County: Varaždin County
- Municipality: Trnovec Bartolovečki

Area
  - Total: 4.8 km^{2} (1.9 sq mi)

Population (2021)
  - Total: 360
  - Density: 75/km^{2} (190/sq mi)
- Time zone: UTC+1 (CET)
  - Summer (DST): UTC+2 (CEST)
- Postal code: 42202 Trnovec Bartolovečki
- Area code: +385 (0)42

Štefanec is a village in Varaždin County, Croatia.

The village is located near Lake Varaždin, around 8 kilometres east of Varaždin, and belongs to the Trnovec Bartolovečki municipality. Its population in the 2001 census was 412. It was formerly known as Štefanec Bartolovečki, which was mentioned as its official name in all censuses between 1953 and 1991.

The D2 state road goes through the village.
