= Breznički Hum =

- Municipality
- Općina Breznički Hum; Municipality of Breznički Hum
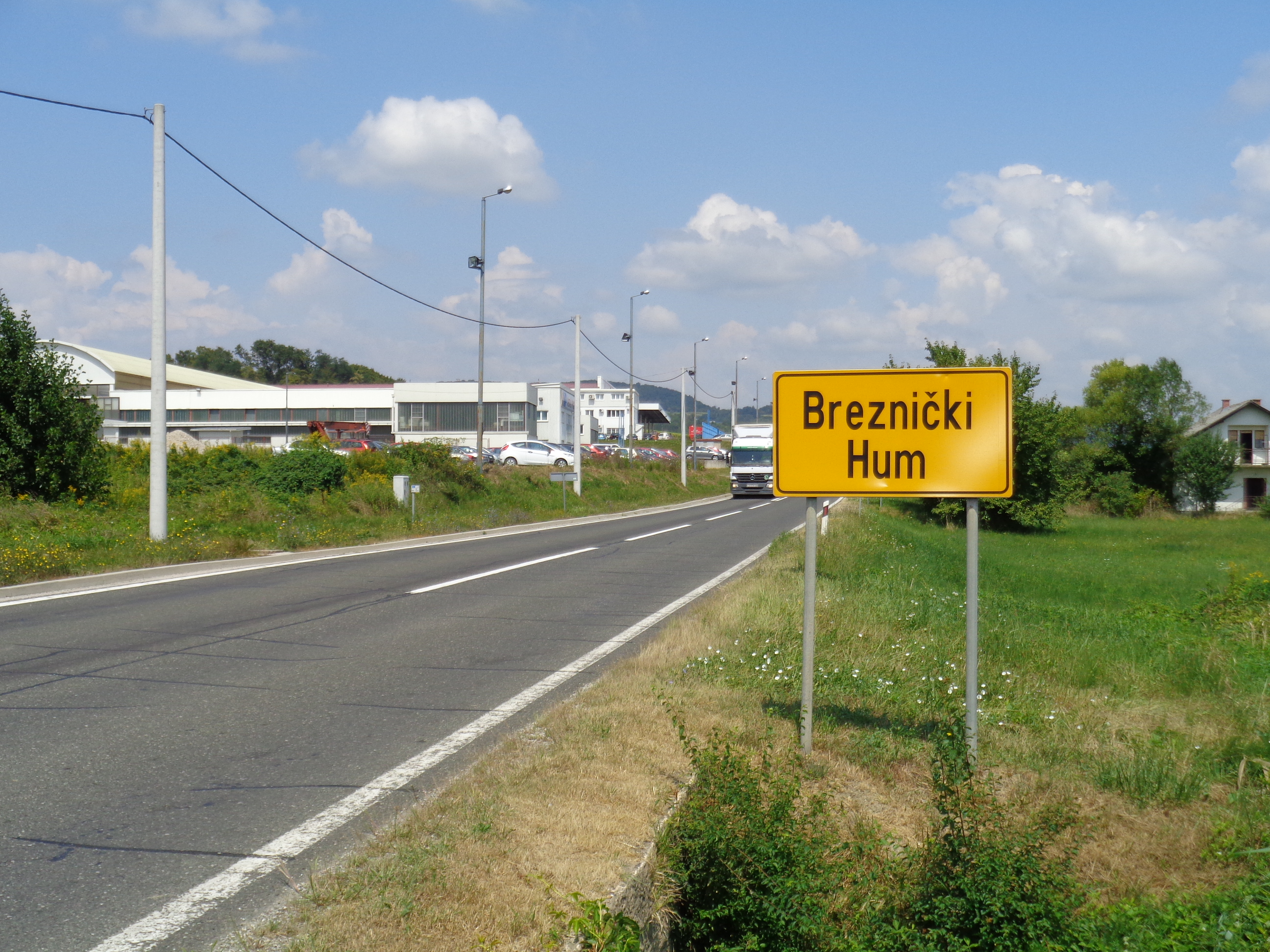
- Entrance to the village

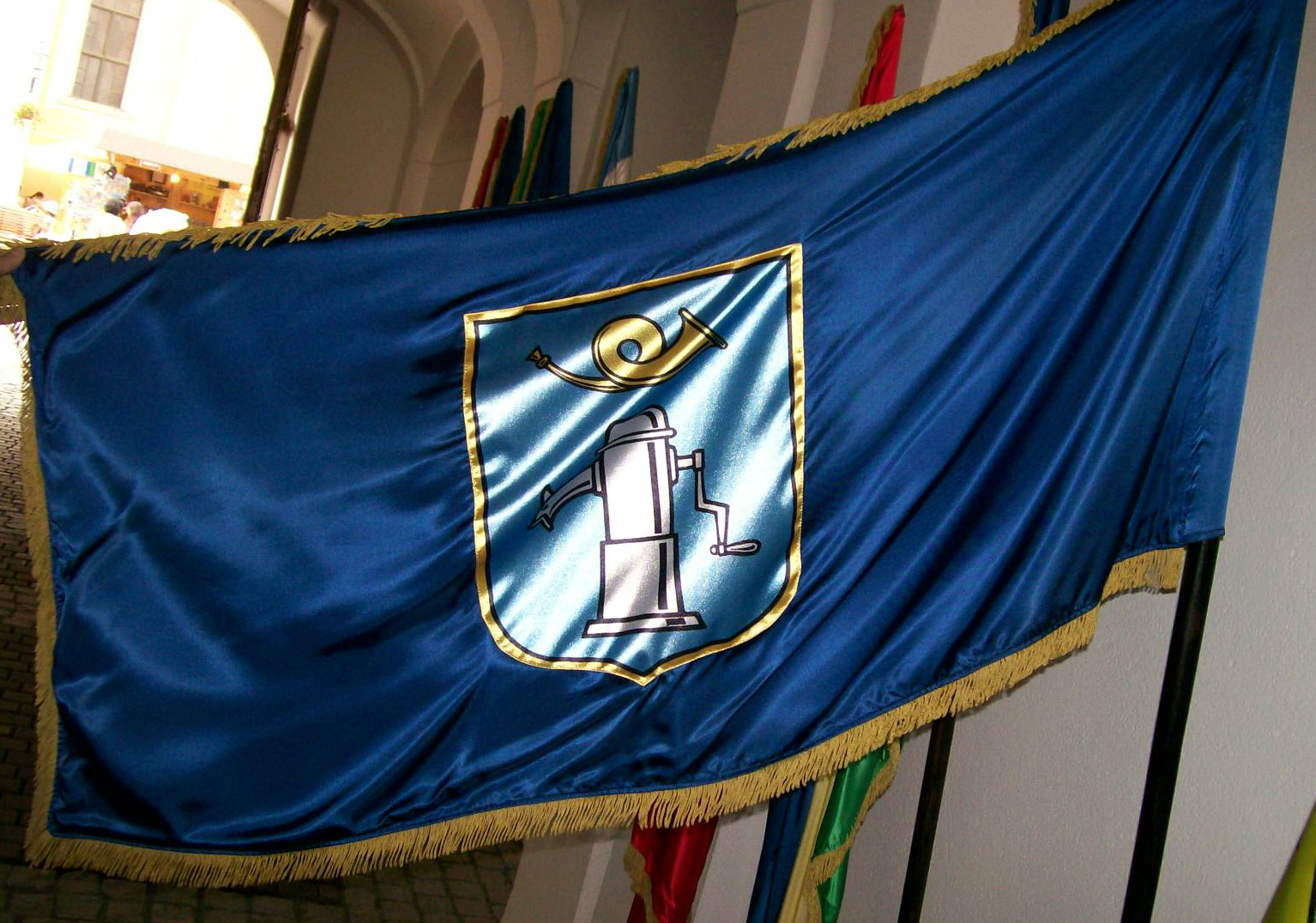
- Flag

- Location of Breznički Hum in Croatia
- Coordinates: 46°06′16″N 16°16′50″E
- Country: Croatia
- County: Varaždin County

Government
  - Municipal mayor: Darko Žugčić (HDZ)

Area
  - Municipality: 26.0 km^{2} (10.0 sq mi)
  - Urban: 5.6 km^{2} (2.2 sq mi)

Population (2021)
  - Municipality: 1,132
  - Density: 43.5/km^{2} (113/sq mi)
  - Urban: 410
  - Urban density: 73/km^{2} (190/sq mi)
- Time zone: UTC+1 (CET)
  - Summer (DST): UTC+2 (CEST)
- Postal code: 42225 Breznički Hum
- Vehicle registration: VŽ
- Website: breznicki-hum.hr

Breznički Hum is a village and municipality in Croatia in Varaždin County.

== Demographics ==
In the 2021 census, the municipality had a population of 1,132 in the following settlements:

- Breznički Hum, population 410
- Butkovec, population 200
- Krščenovec, population 101
- Radešić, population 155
- Šćepanje, population 266

The majority of inhabitants are Croats, making up 99.12% of the population.

Breznički Hum: Population trends 1857–2021
v

population	1624	1760	1901	2173	2287	2601	2464	2852	2978	2960	2763	2395	2041	1740	1575	1356	1132
	1857	1869	1880	1890	1900	1910	1921	1931	1948	1953	1961	1971	1981	1991	2001	2011	2021

Sources: Croatian Bureau of Statistics publications

== Administration ==
The current municipal mayor of Breznički Hum is Darko Žugčić (HDZ) and the Breznički Hum Municipal Council consists of 9 seats.

Groups	Councilors per group
HDZ	5 / 9
HNS-HSS-Reformists-SDP	4 / 9
