= Ludbreg =

City in Varaždin County, Croatia

- City
- Grad Ludbreg
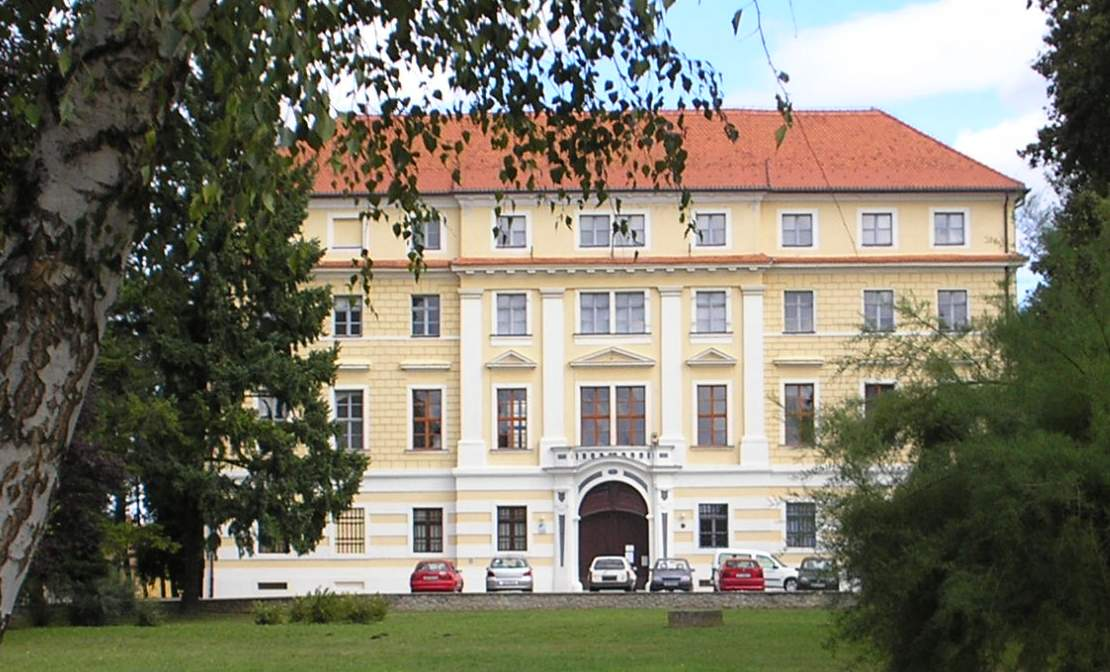
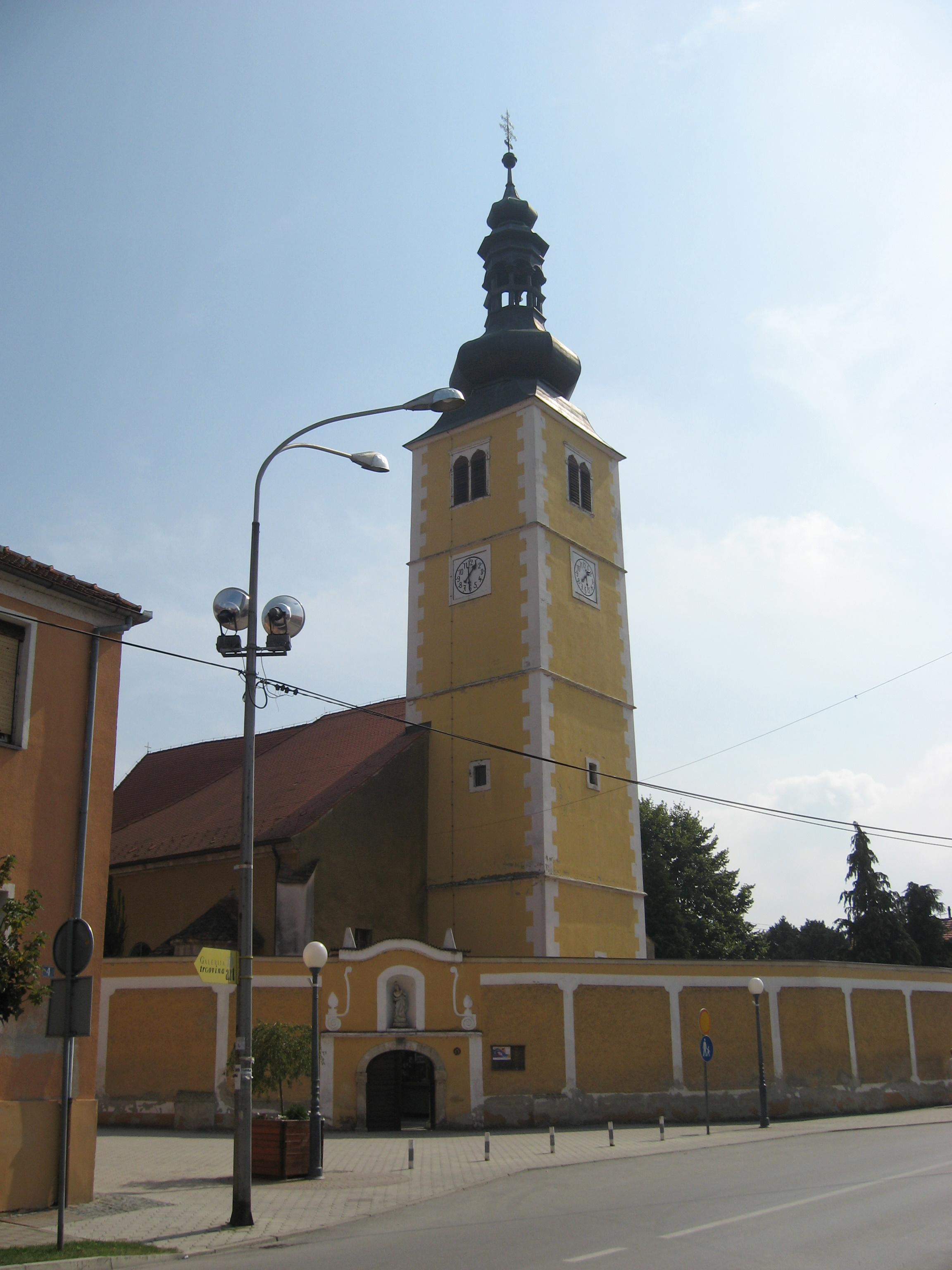
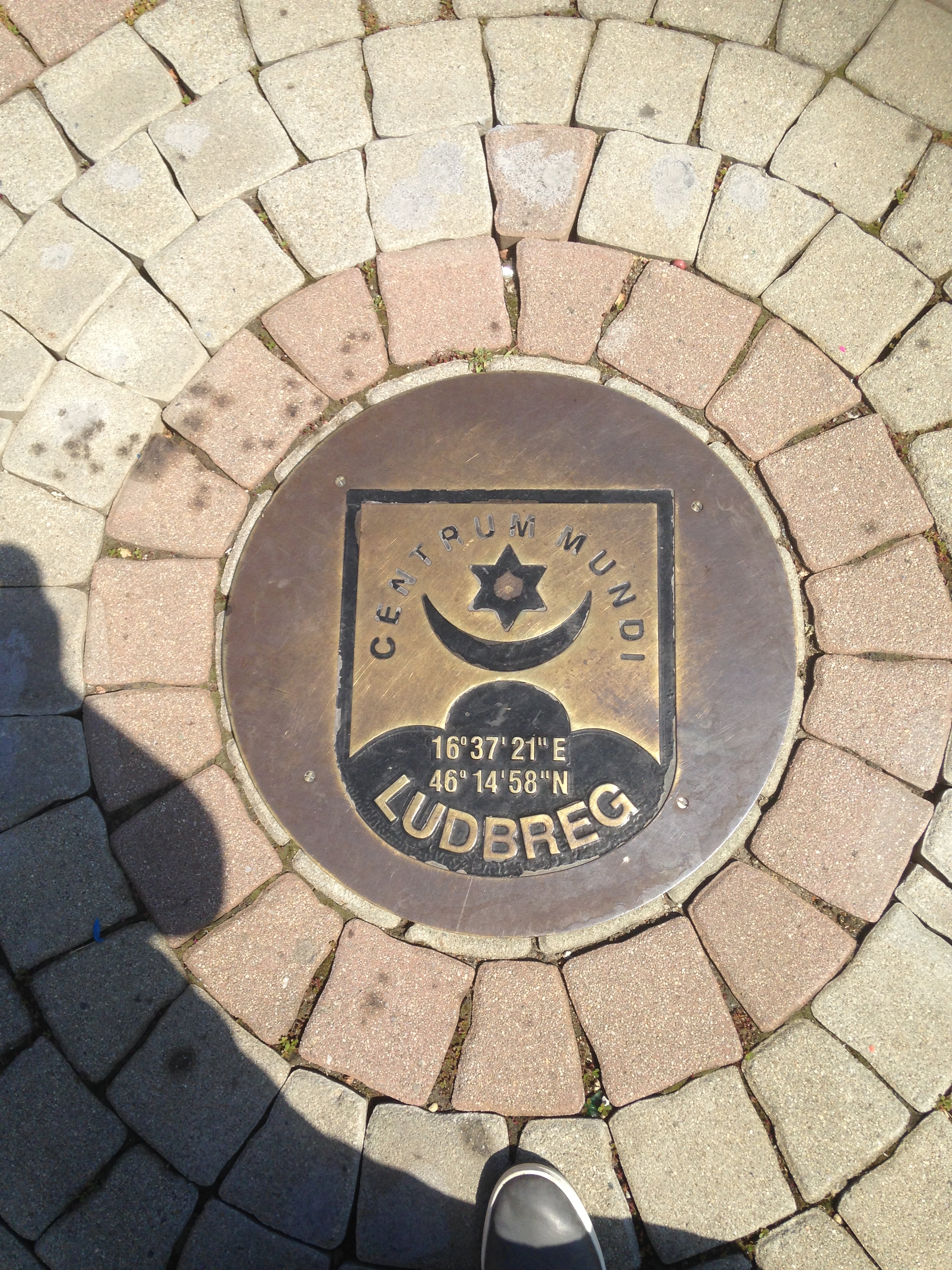
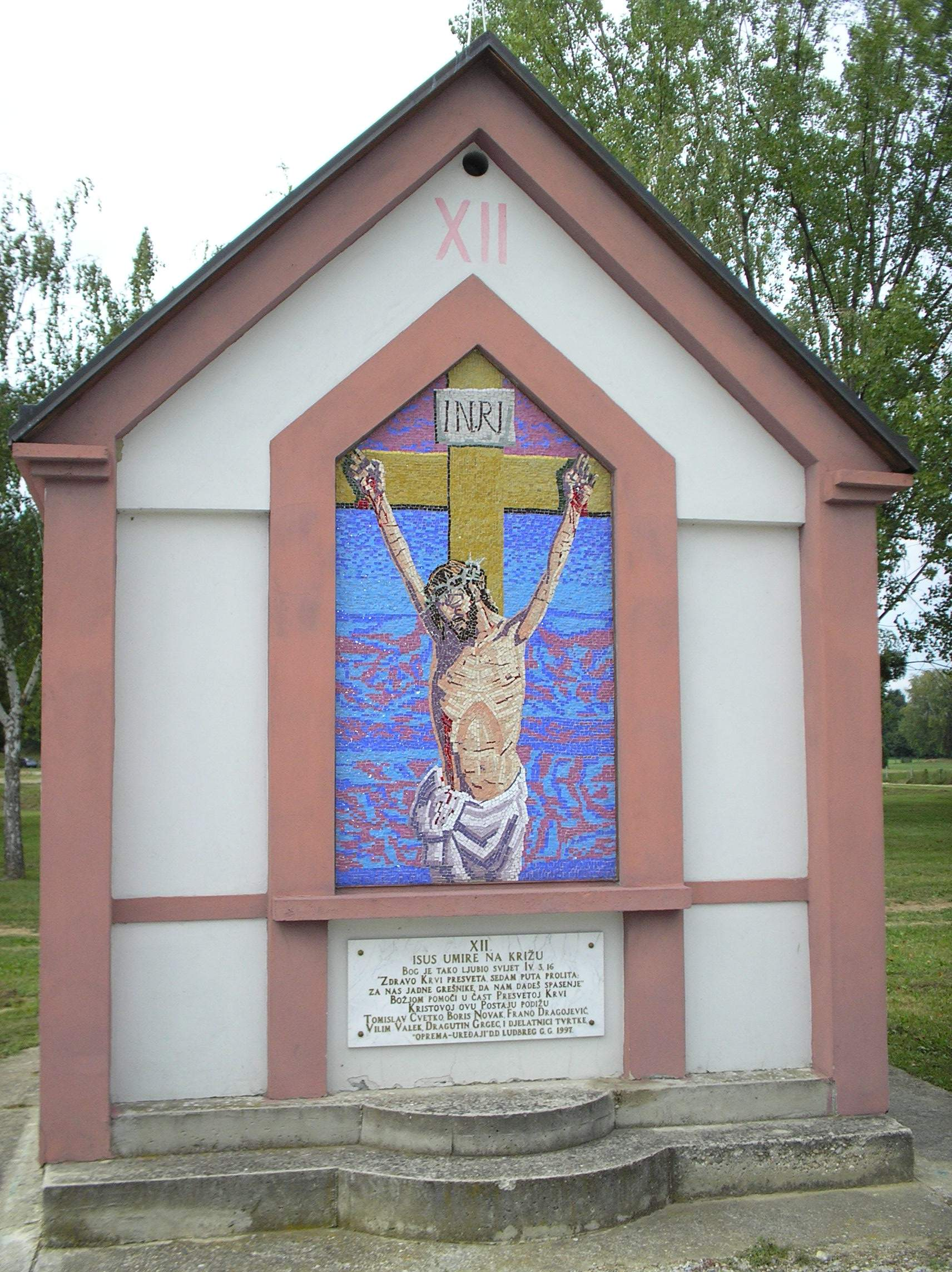
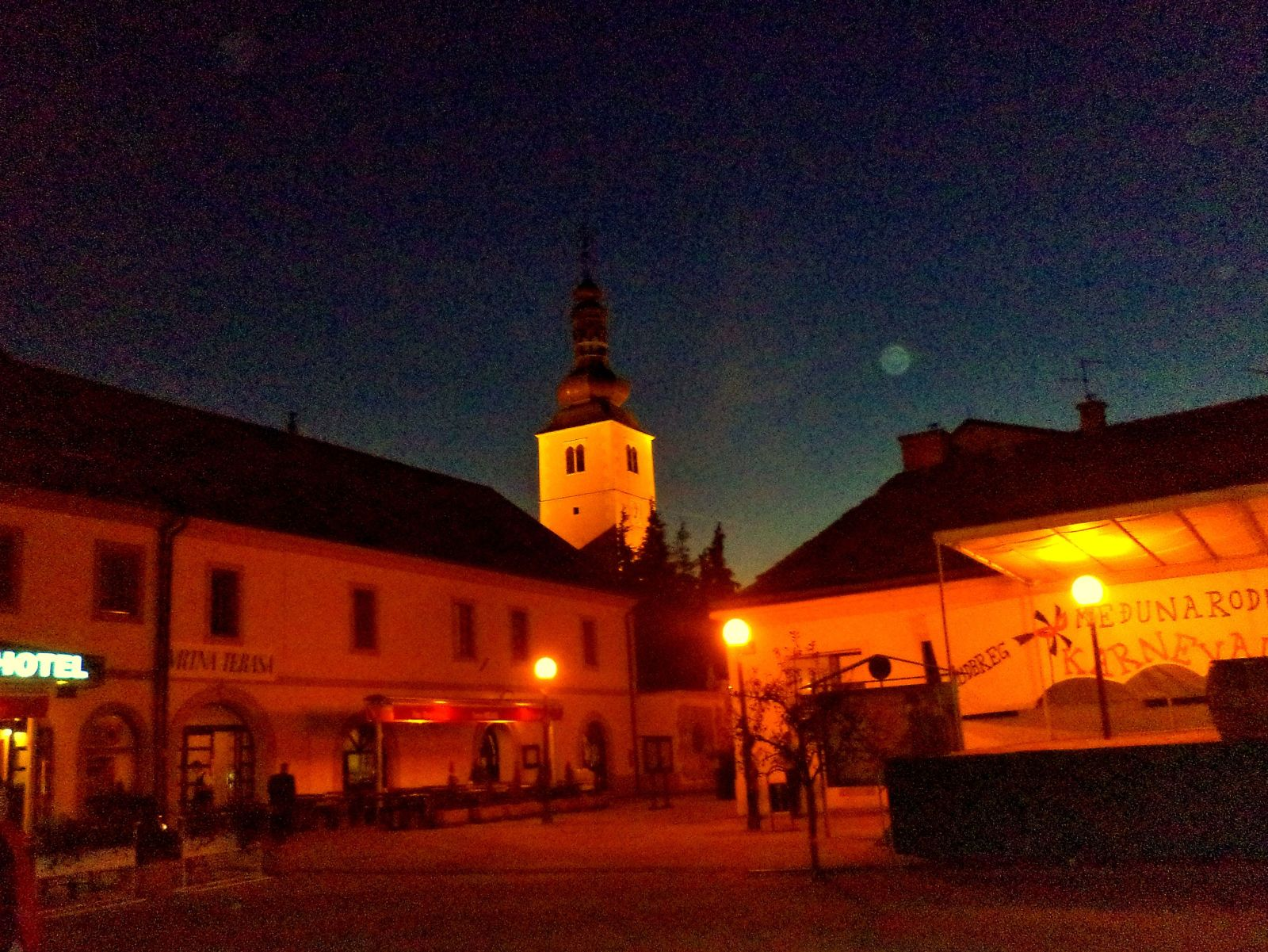
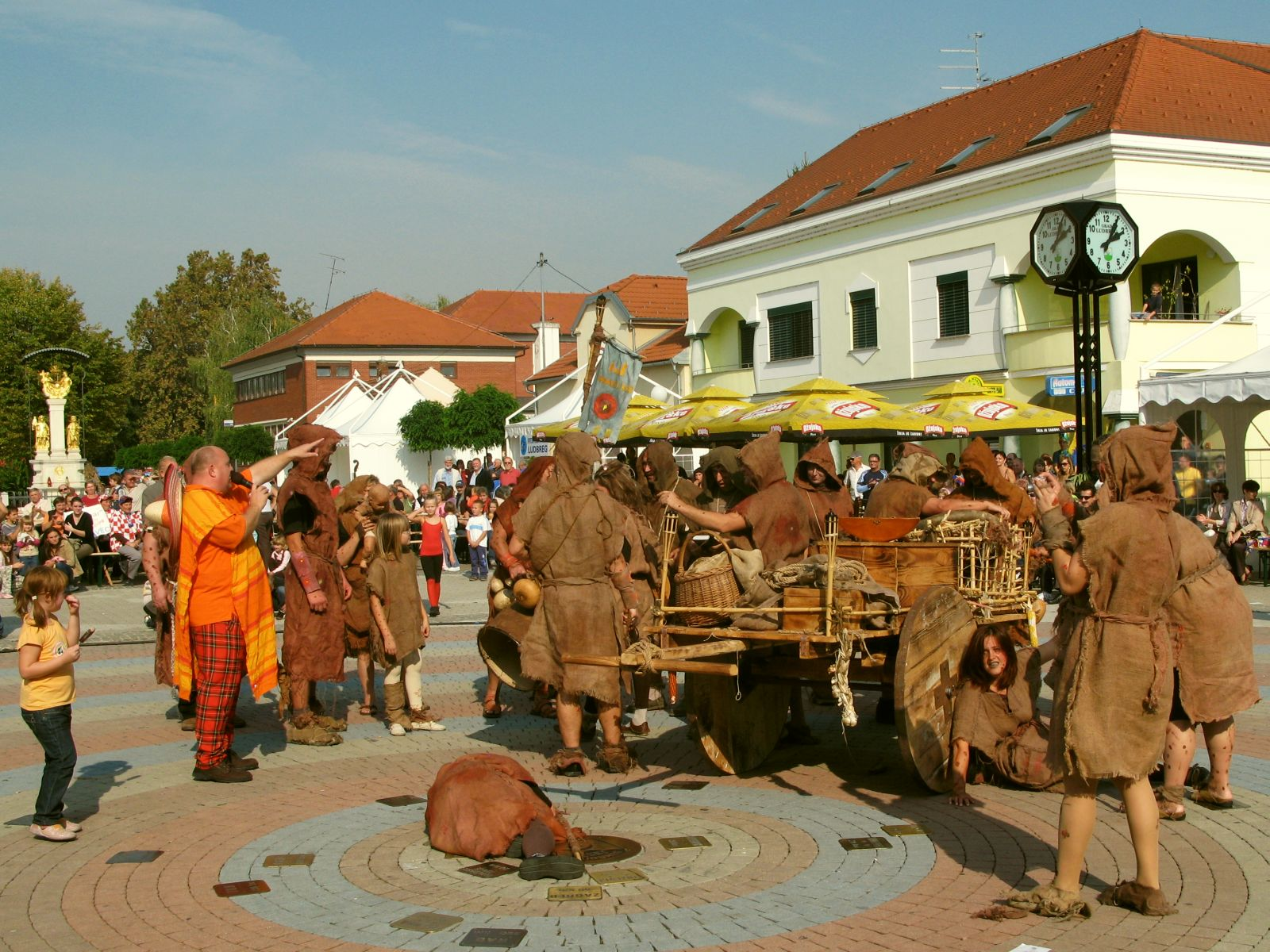
- Ludbreg

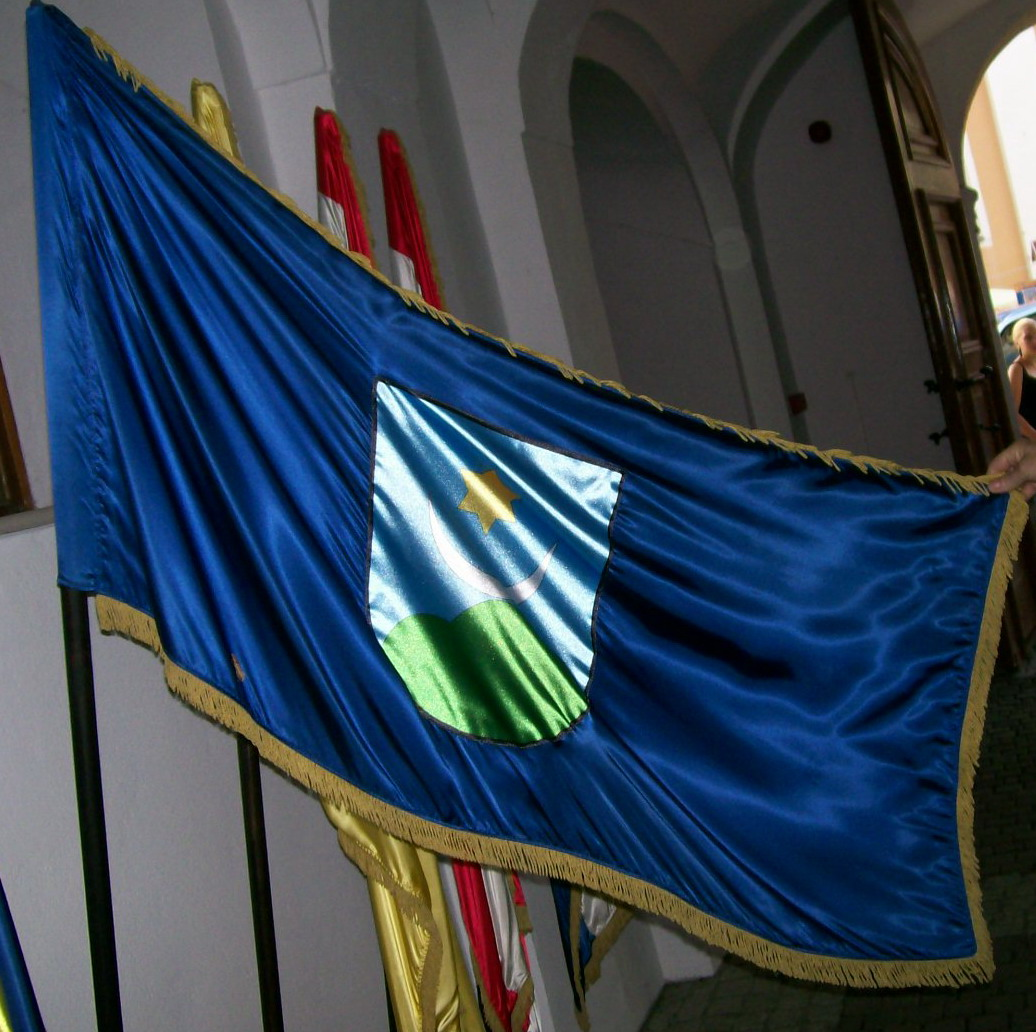
- Flag
- Nickname: Center of the World
- Position of Ludbreg in Croatia
- Coordinates: 46°15.0′N 16°36.6′E
- Country: Croatia
- Region: Northern Croatia (Podravina)
- County: Varaždin County

Government

Area
  - City: 74.2 km^{2} (28.6 sq mi)
  - Urban: 4.7 km^{2} (1.8 sq mi)

Population (2021)
  - City: 8,477
  - Density: 114/km^{2} (296/sq mi)
  - Urban: 3,463
  - Urban density: 740/km^{2} (1,900/sq mi)
- Time zone: UTC+1 (CET)
  - Summer (DST): UTC+2 (CEST)
- Website: ludbreg.hr

Ludbreg is a town in Croatia, located halfway between Varaždin and Koprivnica near the river Drava. It has 3,603 inhabitants, and a total of 8,478 in the entire municipality (census 2011).

== History ==
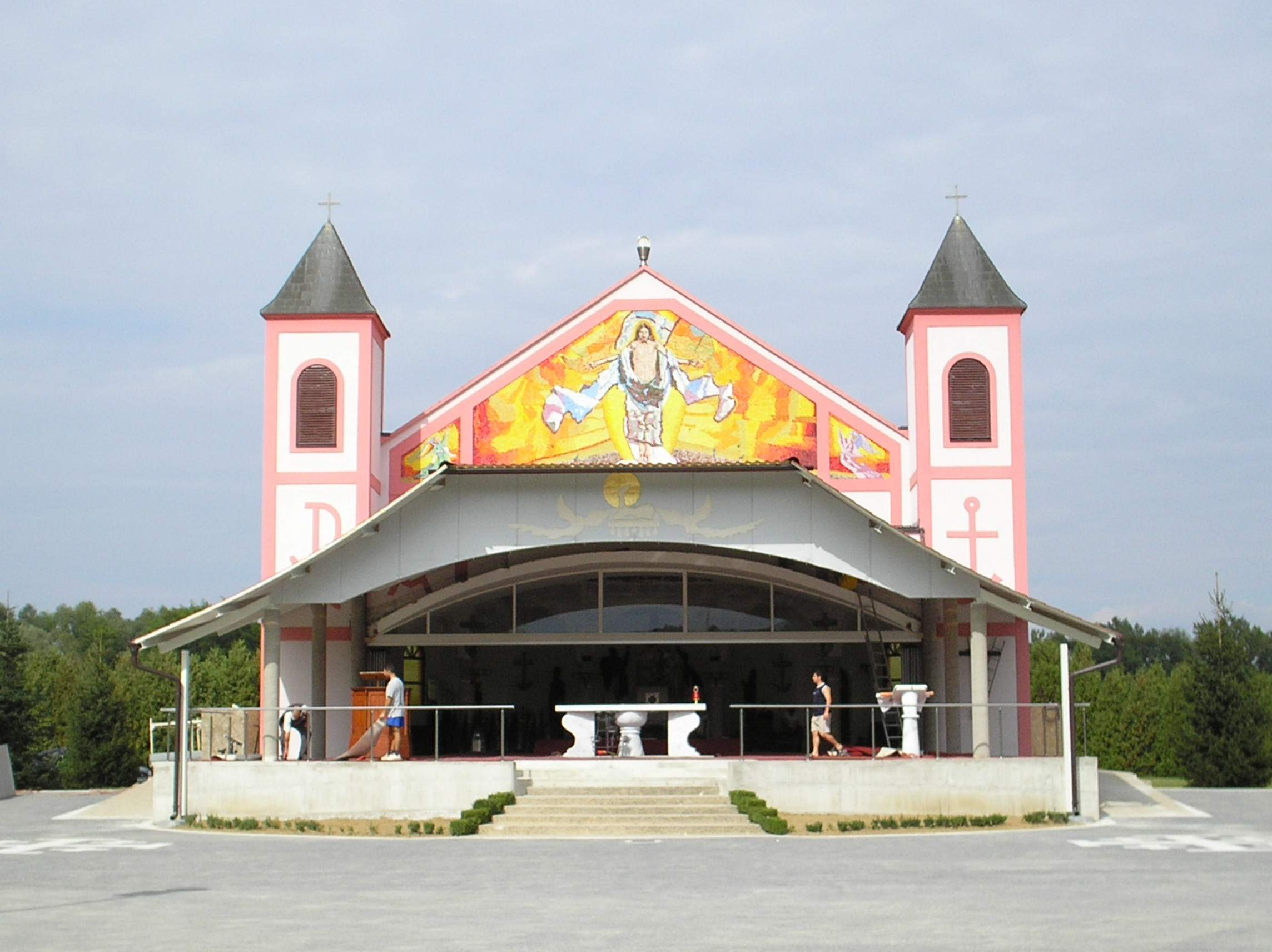
Precious Blood Chapel

For centuries Ludbreg has been a popular place of pilgrimage. In 1320 the city was mentioned for the first time as Castrum Ludbreg, when owned by Hungarian noble Nicholas Ludbregi. The name of the town comes probably from a crusader named Lobring, who founded the settlement. The renovated Castle of Batthyány is home to a well-known restoration workshop. Ludbreg is also a region of vineyard cultivation (especially Riesling and Graševina).

The town gained fame after the eucharistic miracle, which happened in the castle chapel in 1411 and was investigated and confirmed by Pope Leo X in 1513.

In the late 19th and early 20th century, Ludbreg was a district capital in Varaždin County of the Kingdom of Croatia-Slavonia.

On 24 April 1932, the town saw a protest that was one of the earliest open acts of resistance against the 6 January Dictatorship.

== Climate ==
Since records began in 1981, the highest temperature recorded at the local weather station was 38.2 °C (100.8 °F), on 24 August 2012. The coldest temperature was −26.6 °C (−15.9 °F), on 8 January 1985.

== Municipality ==
The following settlements comprise the Ludberg municipality:

- Apatija, population 250
- Bolfan, population 413
- Čukovec, population 322
- Globočec Ludbreški, population 491
- Hrastovsko, population 760
- Kućan Ludbreški, population 186
- Ludbreg, population 3,603
- Segovina, population 37
- Selnik, population 844
- Sigetec Ludbreški, population 667
- Slokovec, population 257
- Vinogradi Ludbreški, population 648

== Population ==
Town of Ludbreg: Population trends 1857–2021
v

population	3571	4208	4595	5314	5838	6145	5999	6807	7056	7153	7002	7344	8165	8485	8668	8478	8477
	1857	1869	1880	1890	1900	1910	1921	1931	1948	1953	1961	1971	1981	1991	2001	2011	2021

Sources: Croatian Bureau of Statistics publications

== Notable people ==
- Rudolf Fizir (1891–1960), airplane constructor
- Mladen Kerstner (1928–1991), writer
- Dubravka Krušelj Jurković (born 1972), opera singer
- Tomislav Mužek (born 1976), opera singer
- Vladimir Filipović (1906–1984), philosopher
- Sara Kolak (born 1995), javelin thrower
- Mladen Pavković (born 1951)
