= 1994 Gdańsk bus crash =

Bus crash in Gdańsk, Poland killing 32 people

Coordinates: 54.352361°N 18.476694°E

- The crash site

Details
- Date: 19:00, 2 May 1994
- Location: Gdańsk,
- Country: Poland
- Line: Zawory-Kartuzy-Gdańsk
- Operator: PKS Gdańsk
- Owner: PKS
- Incident type: Collision with tree
- Cause: Burst tire (overcrowding)

Statistics
- Bus: Autosan H9-21
- Passengers: 75
- Deaths: 32
- Injured: 43

The 1994 Gdańsk bus crash was a bus crash near Gdańsk involving a commuter bus of PKS (Przedsiębiorstwo Komunikacji Samochodowej) that veered into a road-side tree. In the accident, 32 people died and 43 were injured.

== Accident ==
The accident occurred on the afternoon of Monday, 2 May 1994. After a twenty-minute scheduled stop at a depot in Zawory, the bus – an Autosan H9-21 – began its return to Gdańsk with just two passengers. However, at the next scheduled stop in Chmielenek, several more people boarded the bus. Further along the route, large numbers of passengers boarded the vehicle at stops in Chmielno and in Kartuzy. At Żukowo, the driver agreed to the request of some passengers to make a stop. Finally, when the bus stopped in Leźno, an additional eight people boarded. By this time, the overcrowded vehicle was carrying 74 passengers, far in excess of the maximum allowable capacity of 51 (39 sitting, 12 standing).

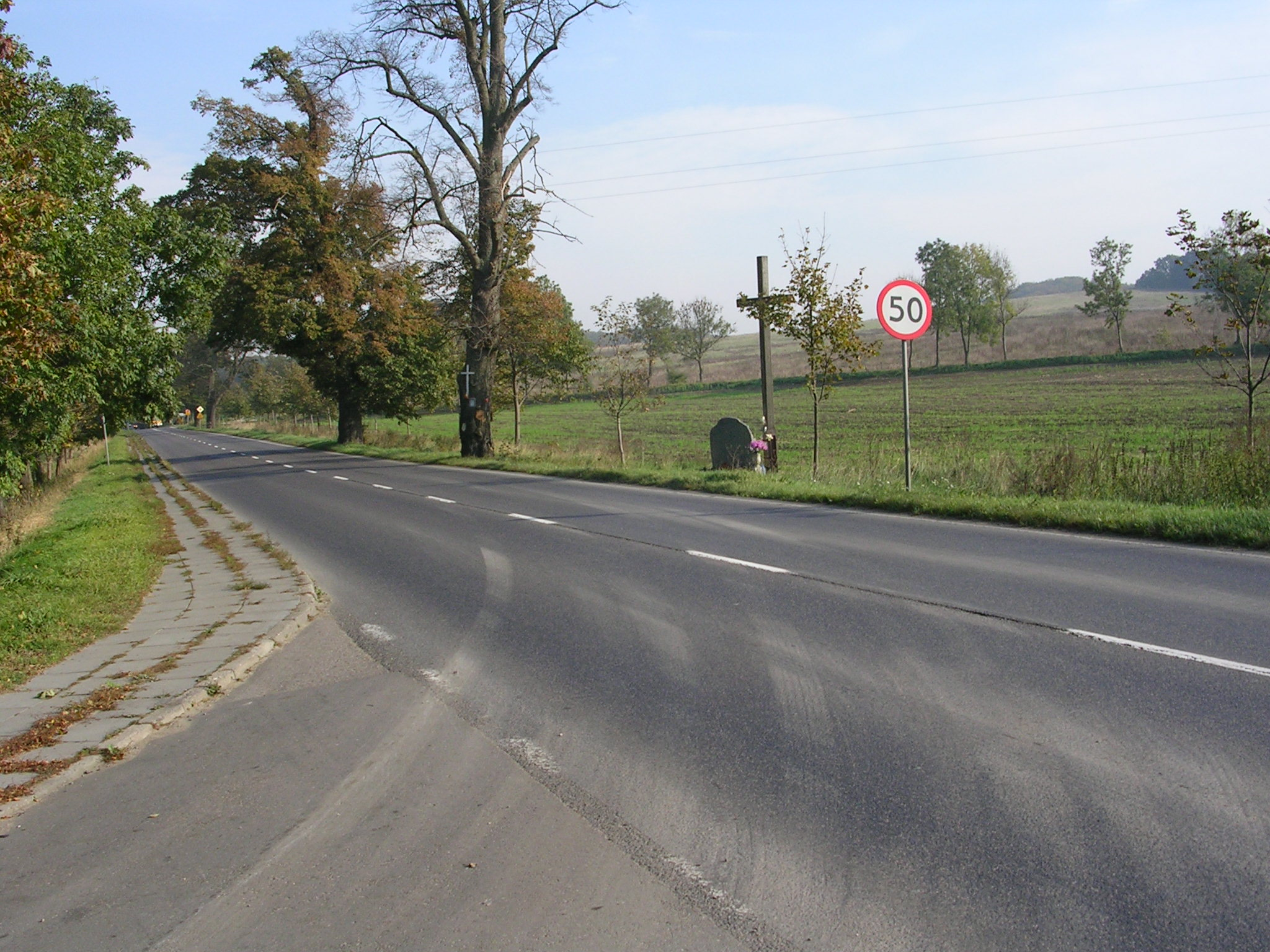
Site of the accident, marked by a cross

Thirty-two kilometers after the start of its journey and 500 meters before its next scheduled stop in Gdańsk-Kokoszki, the overloaded bus veered off the road and crashed into a tree while attempting to pass a Jelcz truck. The force of the impact drove the tree 4.2 meters into the body of the bus. In the collision, 25 passengers died immediately, with five passengers dying shortly after while being transported to local hospitals (two of them before reached hospitals.) Two additional victims died five and six days after crash, respectively, while the driver, Jerzy Marczyński, survived.

== Cause of accident ==
The court case was closed in 1999, after a one-and-a-half-year inquiry into the accident.

The immediate cause of the accident was found to be the explosion of the front right tire, with contributing causes given as:

- Overcrowding on the bus (74 passengers instead of 51)
- The excessive speed of the bus during the accident sequence (60 km/h instead of 50 km/h)
- Generally poor condition of the 11-year-old bus

The tree which the bus struck was cut down in February 2008.

== See also ==
- List of disasters in Poland by death toll

== Sources ==
- News item at wiadomosci.polska.pl (in Polish)
- Jarosław Reszka, "Goodbye! We are gone..." The biggest catastrophes in post-war Poland.
- "Gazeta Wyborcza" archives articles
