= Lampa =

Lampa may refer to:

== Places ==
- Lampa, Chile, a Chilean town in the Province of Chacabuco, Metropolitan Region of Santiago
- Lampa, China, an alternative name for Lampacau, an island in the Pearl River Delta
- Lampa (Crete), a town of ancient Crete, Greece
- Lampa, Peru
  - Lampa Province, Peru
- Lampa, Poland

== Other ==
- Rachael Lampa, Christian pop and rock singer
- Lampa (film) (Lamp), a Polish film
- LAMPA, an abbreviation for lysergic acid methylpropylamide
- Lampa (see), a former bishopric and current titular see of the Roman Catholic Church

== See also ==
- Lampas, a luxury fabric
