= Garcz railway station =

Railway station in Poland

Garcz
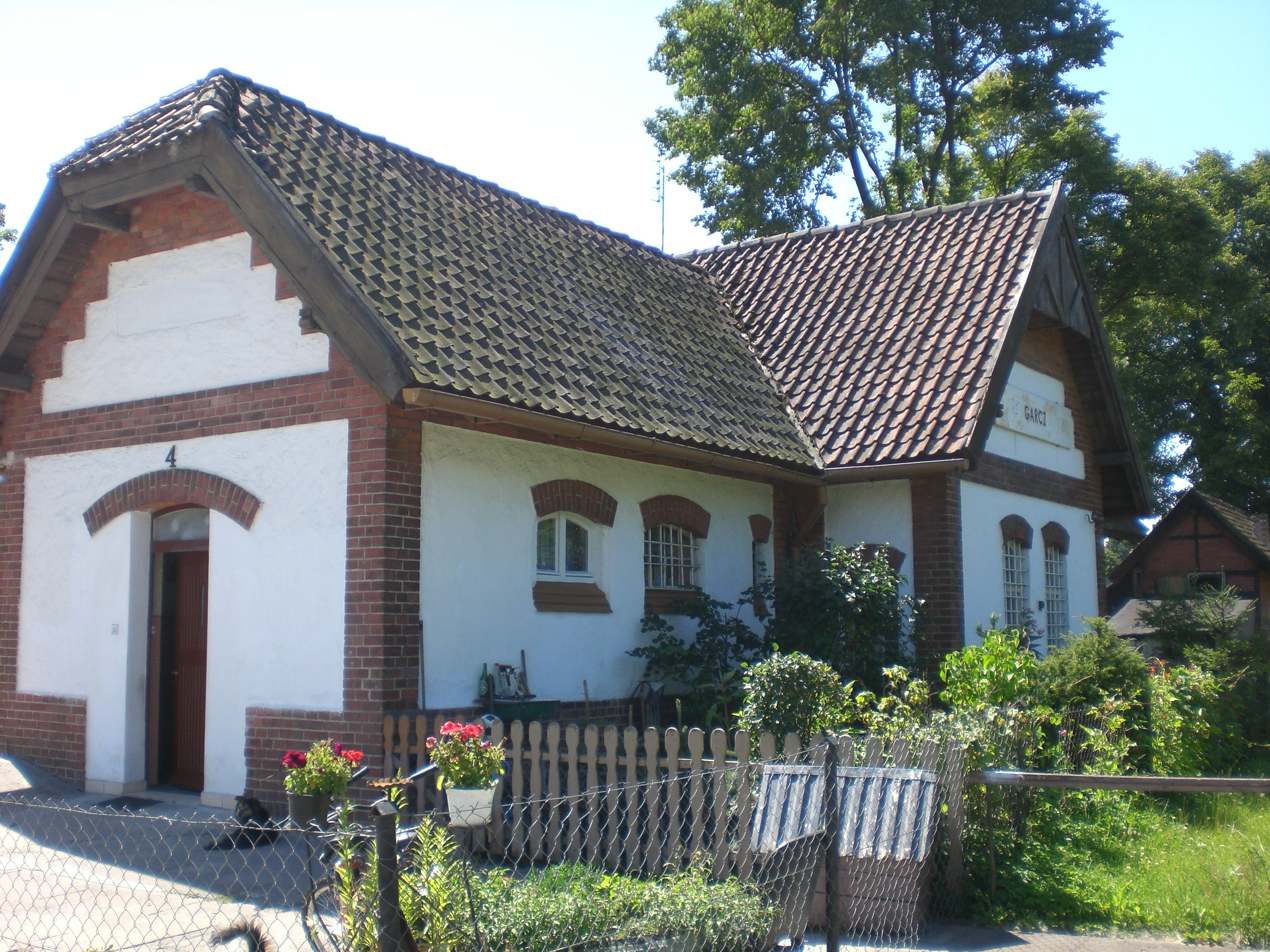

General information
- Location: Garcz; Poland
- Coordinates: 54.346740°N 18.113073°E
- Owner: Polskie Koleje Państwowe S.A.
- Platforms: 1

Construction
- Structure type: Building: Yes (no longer used); Depot: Never existed Water tower: Never existed

History
- Former names: Gartsch until 1945
Location

Garcz is a disused PKP railway station in Garcz (Pomeranian Voivodeship), Poland.

== Lines crossing the station ==
Start station	End station	Line type
Pruszcz Gdański	Łeba	Closed
