= Strysza =

Strysza may refer to the following places in Poland:

- Strysza Buda
- Strysza Góra
