= Miechucino railway station =

Railway station in Poland

Miechucino
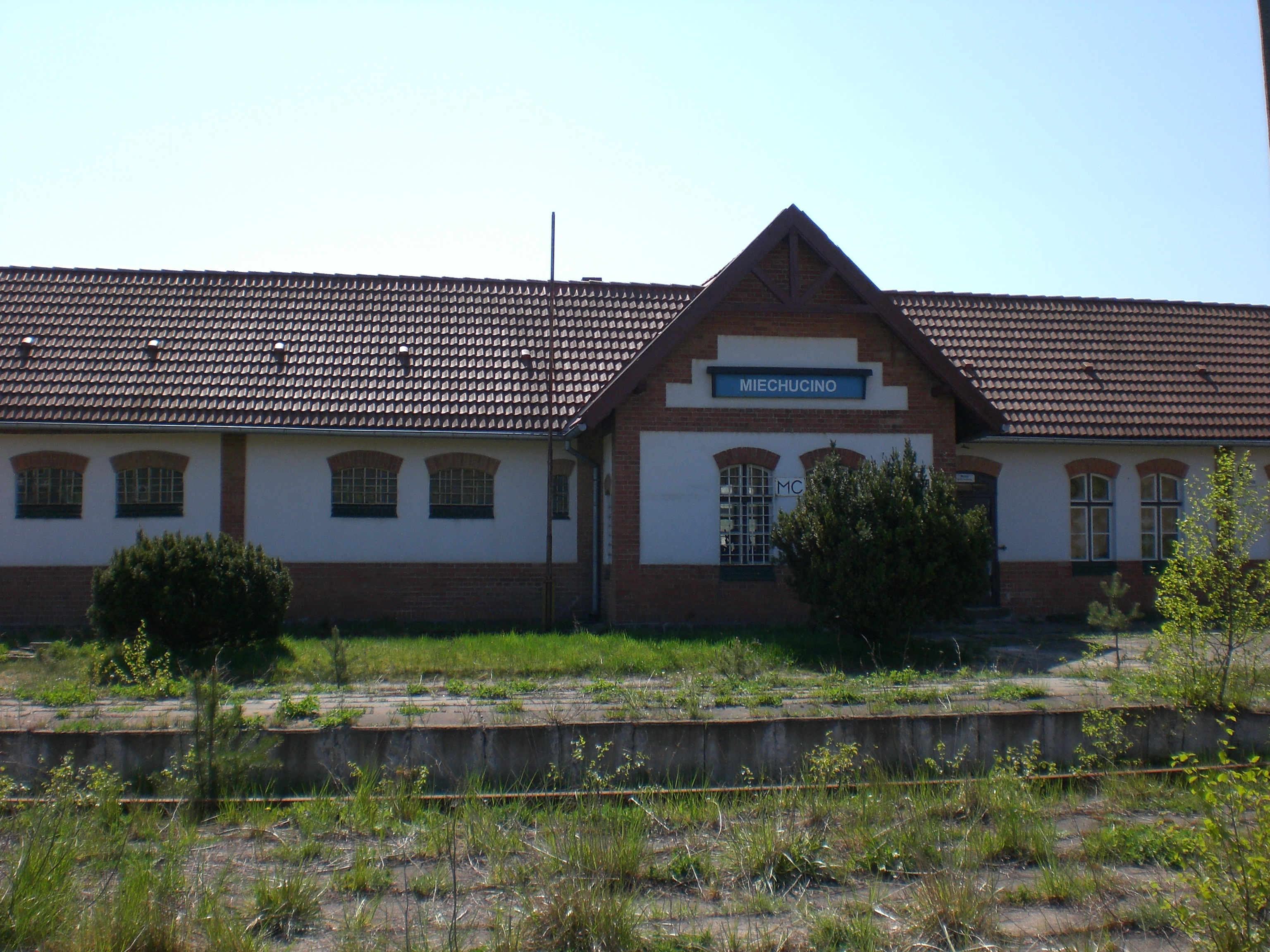

General information
- Location: Miechucino; Poland
- Coordinates: 54.341741°N 18.028580°E
- Owner: Polskie Koleje Państwowe S.A.

Construction
- Structure type: Building: Yes (no longer used); Depot: Never existed Water tower: Yes (no longer used)

History
- Former names: Mechenhof until 1945
Location

Miechucino is a non-operational PKP railway station in Miechucino (Pomeranian Voivodeship), Poland.

== Lines crossing the station ==
Start station	End station	Line type
Pruszcz Gdański	Łeba	Closed
