= Borzestowski =

Borzestowski (masculine) or Borzestowska (feminine) may refer to

- Donnie Borzestowski, the drummer of the Australian indie rock group Gang of Youths
- Marek Borzestowski, a founder of the group of companies Wirtualna Polska
- Szymon (musician) (Szymon Josiah Borzestowski, 1989–2012), Australian musician and brother of Donnie
- Borzestowska Huta, a village in Poland
