= Cuckoo clock in culture =

Clock in literature, music, cinema, TV

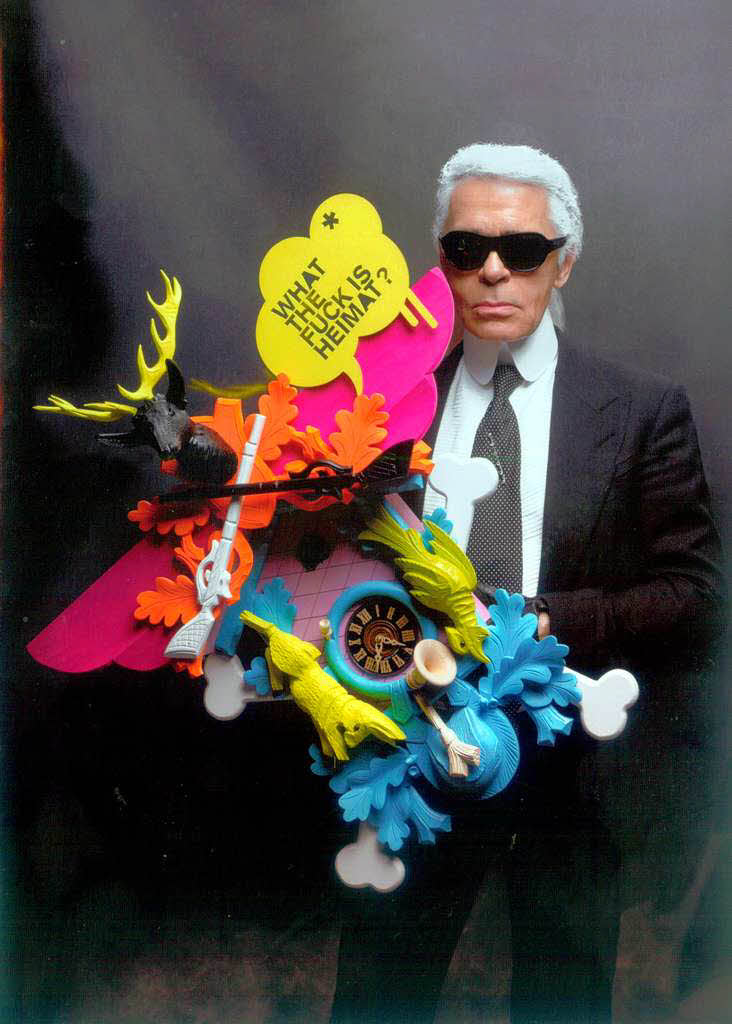
Karl Lagerfeld holding a creation by Stefan Strumbel.

The cuckoo clock, more than any other kind of timepiece, has often featured in literature, music, cinema, television, etc., in the Western culture, as a metaphor or allegory of innocence, childhood, old age, past, fun, mental disorder, etc. It has apparently been viewed more as a symbol or a toy – a folksy musical apparatus with animated figures – fascinating and a bit mysterious rather than as a serious timekeeper.

Although the cuckoo clock functions as a symbol of Switzerland and Swissness, in fact it only has a slim connection with that country in terms of production. Its real home is the Black Forest of Germany.

== Science and technology ==
Inside Sierra Diablo mountains (Texas), is being built the monumental 10,000 Year Clock based upon an idea of Daniel Hillis who in 1995 expressed as follows: "I want to build a clock that ticks once a year. The century hand advances once every 100 years, and the cuckoo comes out on the millennium. I want the cuckoo to come out every millennium for the next 10,000 years." Funded by Jeff Bezos, it is designed to run for ten millennia with minimal maintenance and interruption.

In 2016 Lego, as part of their Lego Mindstorms Remix Challenge, gave 48 hours to four company designers to come up with a new item by combining two different existing products, the Lego Mindstorms EV3 (31313) and the Lego Technic Heavy Lift Helicopter (42052) sets. The winner model was a cuckoo and alarm clock by Jørn Kristian Thomsen. The cuckoo bird pops out to ‘cuckoo’ every 15 minutes and the alarm function triggers a moving, shooting vehicle to get you out of bed.

== Literature ==
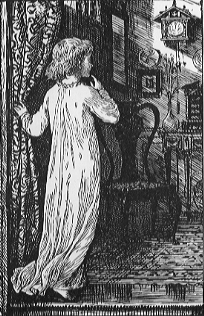
An illustration by Walter Crane from Mrs. Molesworth book "The Cuckoo Clock".

Since its popularization, from the mid-1850s on, it has been a common character in children's literature, comics and cartoons, for educational, comical and/or entertainment purposes. All this is due to children are usually enchanted by the "magic" of a happy bird which lives in a house-shaped clock and pops out to announce the hours. In literature for children examples include:

- The Cuckoo Clock, by Mrs. Molesworth and first published in Edinburgh in 1877, which is the best-known and one of her most celebrated novels for children.
- The Cuckoo in the Clock, a story by Enid Blyton, first published in the book "Round the Clock Stories" in 1945.
- The Happy Hollisters and the Cuckoo Clock Mystery (1956), part of the book series The Happy Hollisters, by Andrew E. Svenson.
- Barnaby's Cuckoo Clock (Tales of Hopping Wood) (published in 1958), text and illustrations by Rene Cloke.
- The Late Cuckoo (1962), text and art by Louis Slobodkin.
- Hildy and the Cuckoo Clock (1966), by Ruth Christoffer Carlsen, illustrations by Wallace Tripp.
- Peter Nick-Nock and the Cuckoo Clock (1971), authored by Dorothy Edwards, illustrations by Alexy Pendle.
- The Cuckoo Clock Castle of Shir (1980), authored and illustrated by Chabad Chasidic artist Michoel Muchnik.
- The Cuckoo Clock (1986), by Mary Stolz and Pamela Johnson (illustrator).
- Cuckoo Clock (1986), by the writer Kavery Bhatt, art by Subir Roy.
- Sam Pig and the Cuckoo Clock (published in 1988), written by Alison Uttley and illustrated by Graham Percy.
- The Cuckoo Clock of Doom (1995), part of the Goosebumps series by R.L. Stine

Regarding novels for adults, there is The Cuckoo Clock (1946) by Milton K. Ozaki.

== Poetry ==
In poetry can be quoted both two poems and two poetry books with the title "The Cuckoo Clock", which were authored, the first one by the major English poet William Wordsworth between 1836 and 1842, first published in "Poems chiefly of Early and Late Years" (1842), the second one by the American writer and publisher John C. Farrar, contained in his booklet "Songs for Parents" published in 1921 and finally the poem books by the Scottish poet and writer Andrew Young (1922) and the Irish Shane Leslie's "The Cuckoo Clock and Other Poems" published in 1987.

"My Cuckoo Clock" by Robert W. Service was published in the book "Carols of an Old Codger" (1954).

== Music ==
When it comes to the art of music, there is a musical work of the Spanish composer, conductor and violinist Tomás Bretón entitled "El reloj de cuco" (The Cuckoo Clock) (1898). Other classical music pieces are;

- "The Cuckoo Clock" (1920), by Leopold Godowsky, the composition number twenty-six from his thirty pieces suite for piano called "Triakontameron".
- "The Cuckoo Clock" (1932), a song for piano and vocal by Thomas Griselle and Victor Young. It was recorded in 1934, performed by the soprano Rosa Ponselle and conducted by Andre Kostelanetz.
- "Cuckoo clock", the best-known composition of Lloyd del Castillo recorded in 1939 by Arthur Fiedler and the Boston Promenade Orchestra.

And the compositions used for piano and string students (or for family entertainment) such as "The Cuckoo Clock" (2003), composed by Lauren Bernofsky for elementary string orchestra.

In popular music, examples include "Cuckoo in the clock" (words by Johnny Mercer and music by Walter Donaldson) recorded by the Glenn Miller orchestra and vocals by Marion Hutton, which became a popular 1939 song in the U.S. and also performed by Johnny Mercer, Bobby Troup, Lena Horne, Sully Mason, Steve Jordan, Mildred Bailey and Martha Tilton.

Years later, in 1962, The Beach Boys released their album Surfin' Safari including the theme "Cuckoo Clock". Another example in popular music is Fernando Olvera, the vocalist and leader of the Mexican pop-rock band Maná, who composed one of their most popular and emotive songs "El reloj cucú" (The Cuckoo Clock), from their album Cuando los Ángeles Lloran (1995), nominated for a 1996 Grammy Award for Best Latin Pop Performance.

== Sculpture ==
In the art of sculpture one of the foremost origami artists, Robert J. Lang made in 1987 a work called "Black Forest cuckoo clock" (opus 182).

== Painting ==
With regard to this art, it has been depicted in paintings like; "The Fiddler" (1932), an oil on canvas by the Irish painter Leo Whelan, and "Old Samovar and Cuckoo Clock" (1997), a cubist watercolor by the Russian Boris Smirnoff.

== Graphic arts ==
In the field of graphic arts, in addition to the illustrators already quoted in the Literature section, it is worth to be mentioned a cuckoo clock plate of the British artist Walter Crane for Mrs. Molesworth's book "The Cuckoo Clock", as well as the pictures created by different illustrators for the various editions of the novel, such as; Charles Copeland (1895), C. E. Brock (1931) and E. H. Shepard for the 1954 edition. Also the print by the American painter and illustrator Norman Rockwell "Courting at Midnight" (1919) display this clock.

Cuckoo clocks have also been drawn by cartoonists such as Vahan Shirvanian in his gag cartoon "Cat Hunting in a Cuckoo Clock".

== Animation ==
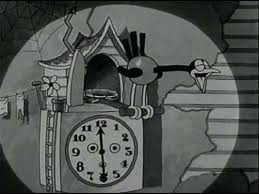
A cuckoo clock as appeared in the 1930 animated cartoon "The Cuckoo Murder Case".

As animated cartoon, it is a recurring character in series, shorts and feature films (many made during The Golden Age of American animation) such as:

- Flip the Frog, "The Cuckoo Murder Case" (1930), by Ub Iwerks.
- Silly Symphonies, "The Clock Store" (1931), by Walt Disney.
- Betty Boop, "Ha! Ha! Ha!" (1934), by Max Fleischer.
- Merrie Melodies; "Little Dutch Plate" (1935), by Friz Freleng, "Cinderella Meets Fella" (1938), animation by Virgil Walter Ross, etc. Cuckoo clocks abound in Warner Bros. cartoons.
- Charlie Cuckoo (1939), short by Walter Lantz.
- Pinocchio (1940), by Walt Disney.
- Tom and Jerry, "Dog Trouble" (1942), by William Hanna and Joseph Barbera.
- Popeye the Sailor, "Ration fer the Duration" (1943), character created by Elzie Crisler Segar.
- Woody Woodpecker (film series), "The Coo Coo Bird" (1947).
- The Bored Cuckoo (1948), short by Bill Tytla.
- The Cuckoo Clock (1950), short by Tex Avery.
- Calling All Cuckoos (1956), short by Walter Lantz.
- Secret Squirrel, "Cuckoo Clock Cuckoo" (1965), by Hanna-Barbera.
- The Pink Panther Show, "In the Pink of the Night" (1969), by David H. DePatie and Friz Freleng.
- Ivor the Engine, "The Cuckoo Clock" (1977), a cutout animation TV series by Oliver Postgate.
- The Adventures of Tintin (TV series), "The Red Sea Sharks" Part 1 (1992), characters created by Hergé.
- Rupert (TV series), "Rupert and the Clock Cuckoo" (1994), by Gary Hurst and Dale Schott.
- South Park, "Starvin' Marvin" (1997), by Trey Parker.
- The Tangerine Bear (2000), by Bert Ring.
- Max & Ruby, "Max's Cuckoo Clock" (2002), by Rosemary Wells.
- The Koala Brothers, "Sammy's Cuckoo Clock" (2005), a stop-motion TV series by David Johnson.
- JoJo's Circus, "Time Flies" (2005), a stop-motion TV series by Jim Jinkins, David Ray Campbell, etc.
- The Simpsons, "Husbands and Knives" (2007), by Matt Groening.
- Peppa Pig, "Cuckoo Clock" (2007), by Neville Astley and Mark Baker.
- Yamishibai, "Cuckoo Clock" (2016), a horror anime directed by Takashi Taniguchi and Tomohisa Ishikawa.

=== Computer animation ===
On computer animation is being used with the objective of telling a story, entertaining and/or commercializing a product. Examples include:

- Animal Mechanicals, "Mechana Cuckoo Clock Island" (2008), by Jeff Rosen.
- Mickey Mouse Clubhouse, "Mickey's Adventures in Wonderland" (2009).
- Handy Manny, "Abuelito's Siesta" (2009), by Roger Bollen and Marilyn Sadler.
- PAW Patrol, "Pups Save a Cuckoo Clock" (2018), by Keith Chapman.
- Puppy Dog Pals, "Cuckoo for Cuckoo Clocks" (2019), by Harland Williams.

== Cinema ==
This timepiece has figured in different movies throughout the history of cinema, used as an allegory to tell or indicate something about the story, reinforce the expressive content of a certain scene, etc. Examples include:

- Die drei Kuckucksuhren (1926), directed by Lothar Mendes.
- The Lodger: A Story of the London Fog (1927), directed by Alfred Hitchcock.
- M (1931), directed by Fritz Lang.
- Doctor X (1932), directed by Michael Curtiz.
- Laurel and Hardy's short Dirty Work (1933), directed by Lloyd French.
- L'orologio a cucù (1938), directed by Camillo Mastrocinque.
- The Outlaw (1943), directed by Howard Hughes.
- The Third Man (1949), directed by Carol Reed, in which Harry Lime (Orson Welles) said: "You know what the fellow said. In Italy for thirty years under the Borgias, they had warfare, terror, murder, and bloodshed, but they produced Michelangelo, Leonardo da Vinci, and the Renaissance. In Switzerland, they had brotherly love, five hundred years of democracy and peace. And what did that produce? The cuckoo clock." This remark was not in the script by Graham Greene but was added by Welles. Greene wrote in a letter: "What happened was that during the shooting of The Third Man it was found necessary for the timing to insert another sentence." Welles said the lines came from "an old Hungarian play". The painter James Abbott McNeill Whistler had said, "The Swiss in their mountains... What more worthy people! Yet, the perverse and scornful will none of it, and the sons of patriots are left with the clock that turns the mill, and the sudden cuckoo, with difficulty restrained in its box!" In This is Orson Welles (1993), Welles is quoted as saying "When the picture came out, the Swiss very nicely pointed out to me that they've never made any cuckoo clocks."
- Invasion of the Body Snatchers (1956), directed by Don Siegel.
- Lampa (1959), directed by Roman Polanski.
- Bunny Lake Is Missing (1965), directed by Otto Preminger.
- Eraserhead (1977), directed by David Lynch.
- Blade Runner (1982), directed by Ridley Scott.
- Out of Africa (1985), directed by Sidney Pollack.
- Saraband (2003), directed by Ingmar Bergman.
- It's Only the End of the World (2016), directed by Xavier Dolan.

== Television ==
Regarding to television, it plays a meaningful role in the next episodes of different TV series such as:

- Kraft Television Theatre, "The Cuckoo Clock" (1954).
- Alfred Hitchcock Presents, "Triggers in Leash" (1955).
- Alfred Hitchcock Presents, "The Cuckoo Clock" (1960).
- The Prisoner, "Hammer into Anvil" (1967).
- The Banana Splits (1968-1970), where a cuckoo clock was a secondary character.
- Hogan's Heroes, "The Antique" (1969).
- Jackanory, "The Cuckoo Clock" (five parts) (1971).
- Are you being served?, "The Clock" (1974).
- Sesame Street, "The Cuckoo Clock" (1985).
- Twin Peaks, "Realization Time" (1990).
- Married... with Children, "The Wedding Show" (1993).
- Goosebumps (1995 TV series), "The Cuckoo Clock of Doom" (1995).
- Bananas in Pyjamas, "Cuckoo Clock" (1996).
- Martin, "Auction" (1997).
- My Name is Earl, "Randy's Touchdown" (2005).
- How I Met Your Mother, "Bad Crazy" (2013).

The British comedy Dave Allen at Large has a sketch taking place in the American West, in which an outlaw loads his revolver and heads for a saloon just before noon, against the pleas and begging of his woman not to go through with it. He tells her, "It's high noon and a man's gotta do what a man's gotta do. There ain't no other time I can do it!" He goes into the saloon where there is a cuckoo clock on the wall. At the stroke of twelve, when the door on the cuckoo clock swings open he shoots the bird. He then tells her, "Like I said, there ain't no other time I can do it!"

British comedian Eric Sykes frequently obtained humour from the cuckoo clock in his house in the 1970s sit-com Sykes. Sykes and on -screen Sister Hattie Jaques treated the clock as though it were a pet, and spoke it as though it was alive. The temperamental bird inside was called Peter, who could usually be called upon to 'cuckoo' at the most opportune moment.

The Discovery Channel TV series Big! (2004), consisted of a team of craftspeople, in welding and metal construction, manufacturing the world's biggest items scaled up to proportions for the sake of setting world records, the devices had to function to qualify. One of the enlarged objects was a cuckoo clock in the episode number 9, although the Guinness World Record was not finally achieved.

It has also appeared on the popular shows How It's Made season 11, episode 4 (2008) and How Do They Do It? season 14, episode 1 (2016).

== Locations ==
The small unincorporated community of Cuckoo in Louisa County, Virginia, United States is named after the Cuckoo Tavern where the first cuckoo clock in the Commonwealth was located.

== See also ==
- List of largest cuckoo clocks
- Cultural icon
- Black Forest
