= Sznurki =

Sznurki Sznërczi
- Village
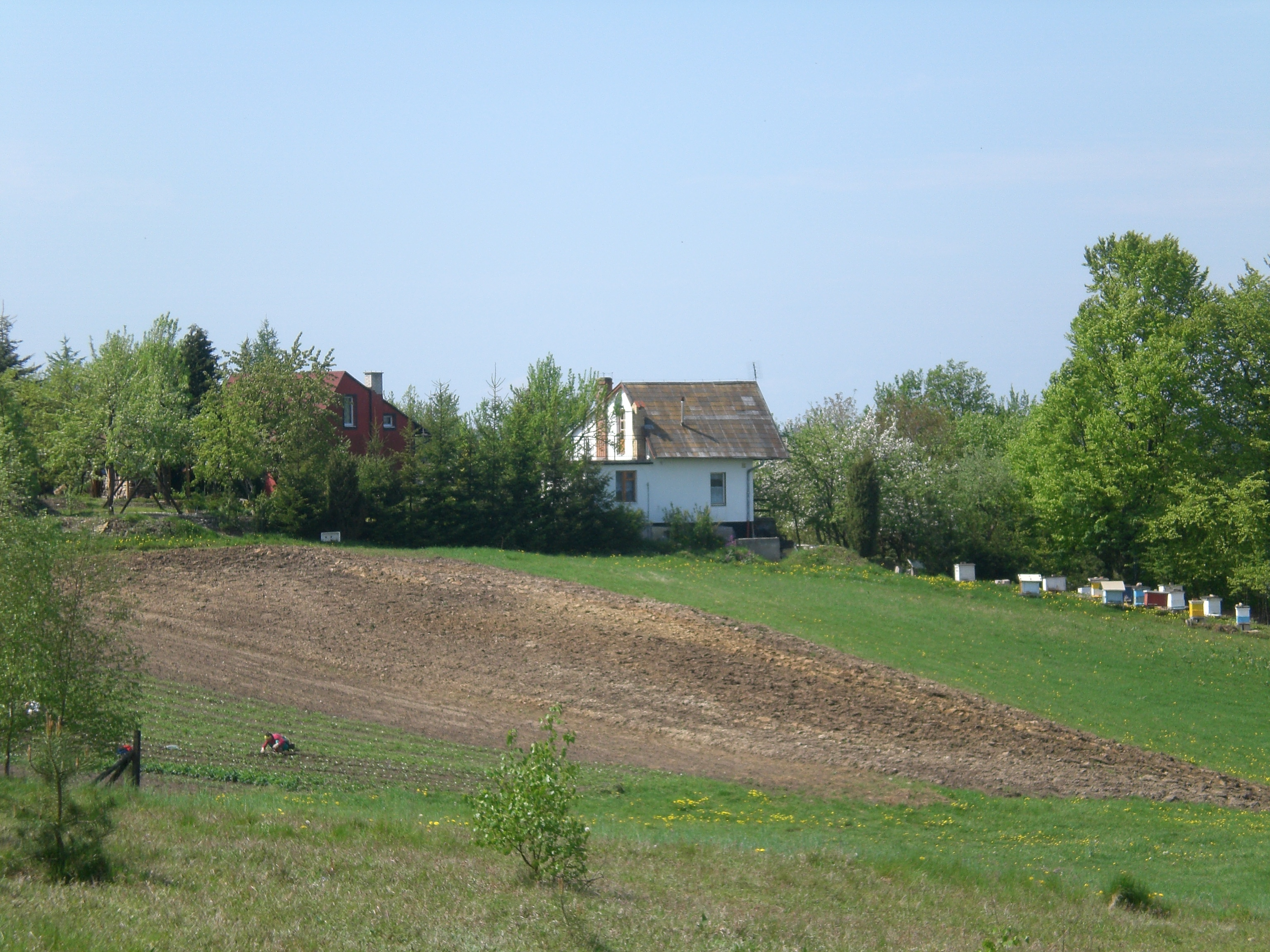

- Location within Poland
- Coordinates: 54°17′28″N 18°3′18″E
- Country: Poland
- Voivodeship: Pomeranian
- County: Kartuzy
- Gmina: Chmielno
- Population: 316

Sznurki [ˈʂnurkʲi] (Kashubian: Sznërczi) is a village in the administrative district of Gmina Chmielno, within Kartuzy County, Pomeranian Voivodeship, in northern Poland.

For details of the history of the region, see History of Pomerania.
