= Lipowiec, Kartuzy County =

Lipowiec Lëpówc
- Village
- Location within Poland
- Coordinates: 54°18′58″N 18°3′25″E
- Country: Poland
- Voivodeship: Pomeranian
- County: Kartuzy
- Gmina: Chmielno

Lipowiec [liˈpɔvjɛt͡s] (Kashubian: Lëpówc) is a village in the administrative district of Gmina Chmielno, within Kartuzy County, Pomeranian Voivodeship, in northern Poland.

For details of the history of the region, see History of Pomerania.
