= Zajezierze, Kartuzy County =

Zajezierze Zajezerzé
- Village
- Location within Poland
- Coordinates: 54°18′56″N 18°0′58″E
- Country: Poland
- Voivodeship: Pomeranian
- County: Kartuzy
- Gmina: Chmielno

Zajezierze [zajɛˈʑɛʐɛ] (Kashubian: Zajezerzé) is a village in the administrative district of Gmina Chmielno, within Kartuzy County, Pomeranian Voivodeship, in northern Poland.

For details of the history of the region, see History of Pomerania.
