= Młyn Górny =

Młyn Górny Górny Młin
- Settlement
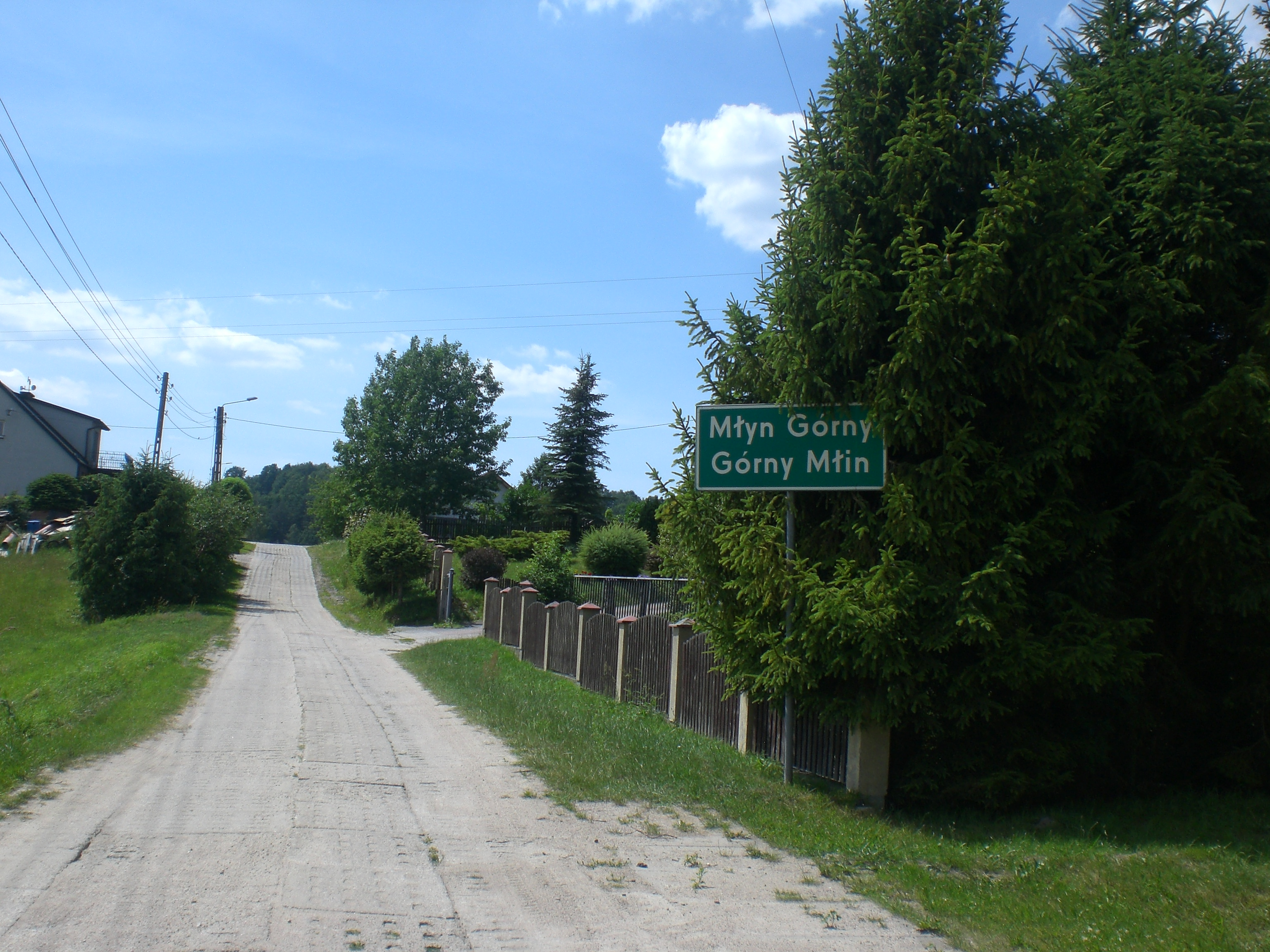

- Location within Poland
- Coordinates: 54°21′8″N 18°4′43″E
- Country: Poland
- Voivodeship: Pomeranian
- County: Kartuzy
- Gmina: Chmielno

Młyn Górny [ˈmwɨn ˈɡurnɨ] (Kashubian: Górny Młin) is a settlement in the administrative district of Gmina Chmielno, within Kartuzy County, Pomeranian Voivodeship, in northern Poland.

For details of the history of the region, see History of Pomerania.
