= Dejk =

- Village
- Location within Poland
- Coordinates: 54°19′24″N 18°3′29″E
- Country: Poland
- Voivodeship: Pomeranian
- County: Kartuzy
- Gmina: Chmielno

Dejk (Polish pronunciation: [dɛjk]) is a village in the administrative district of Gmina Chmielno, within Kartuzy County, Pomeranian Voivodeship, in northern Poland.

For details of the history of the region, see History of Pomerania.
