= Haska, Kartuzy County =

Haska Hôska
- Hamlet
- Location within Poland
- Coordinates: 54°15′42″N 18°3′37″E
- Country: Poland
- Voivodeship: Pomeranian
- County: Kartuzy
- Gmina: Chmielno

Haska [ˈxaska] (Kashubian: Hôska) is a hamlet in the administrative district of Gmina Chmielno, within Kartuzy County, Pomeranian Voivodeship, in northern Poland.

For details of the history of the region, see History of Pomerania.
