= Miechucińskie Chrósty =

Miechucińskie Chrósty Miechùcczé Chróstë
- Settlement
- Location within Poland
- Coordinates: 54°19′43″N 18°2′29″E
- Country: Poland
- Voivodeship: Pomeranian
- County: Kartuzy
- Gmina: Chmielno

Miechucińskie Chrósty [mʲɛxuˈt͡ɕiɲskʲɛ ˈxrustɨ] (Kashubian: Miechùcczé Chróstë) is a settlement in the administrative district of Gmina Chmielno, within Kartuzy County, Pomeranian Voivodeship, in northern Poland.

For details of the history of the region, see History of Pomerania.
