= Przewóz, Kartuzy County =

Przewóz
- Village
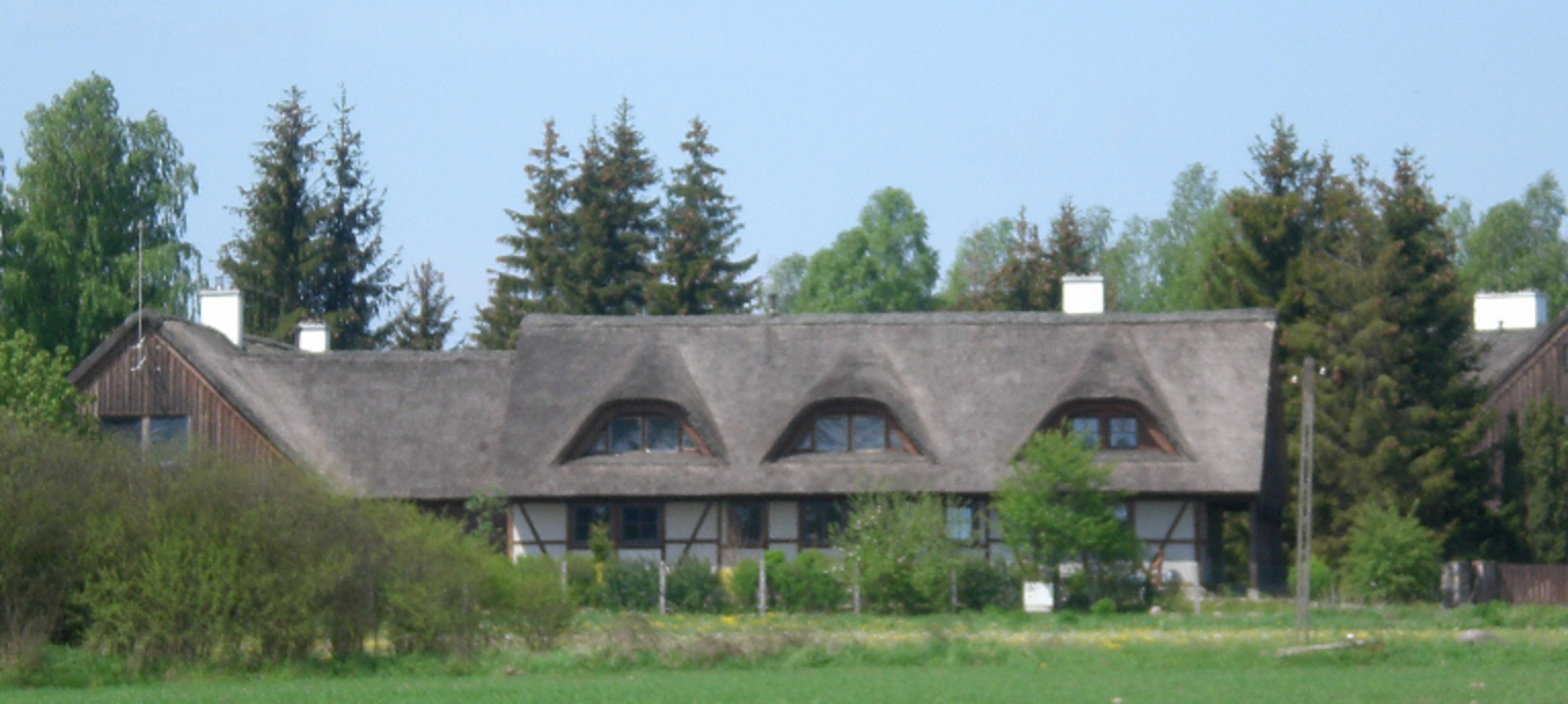

- Location within Poland
- Coordinates: 54°15′49″N 18°1′36″E
- Country: Poland
- Voivodeship: Pomeranian
- County: Kartuzy
- Gmina: Chmielno
- Elevation: 161.6 m (530 ft)
- Population: 343
- Time zone: UTC+1 (CET)
  - Summer (DST): UTC+2 (CEST)

Przewóz [ˈpʂɛvus] is a village in the administrative district of Gmina Chmielno, within Kartuzy County, Pomeranian Voivodeship, in northern Poland.
