= Cieszenie =

Cieszenie Ceszenié
- Village
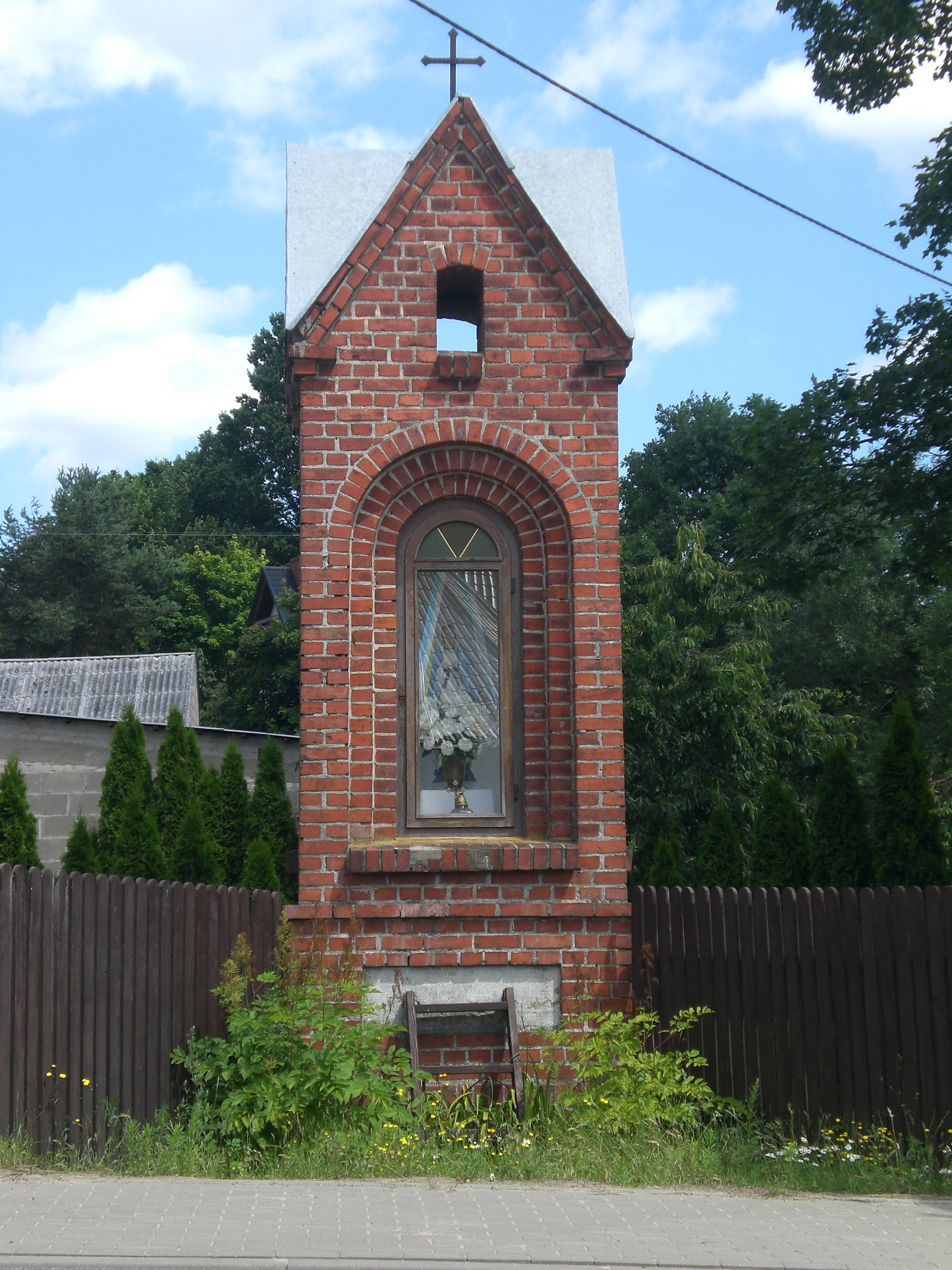
- Wayside shrine

- Location within Poland
- Coordinates: 54°20′33″N 18°3′26″E
- Country: Poland
- Voivodeship: Pomeranian
- County: Kartuzy
- Gmina: Chmielno

Population
  - Total: 404
- Vehicle registration: GKA

Cieszenie [t͡ɕɛˈʂɛɲɛ] (Kashubian: Ceszenié) is a village in the administrative district of Gmina Chmielno, within Kartuzy County, Pomeranian Voivodeship, in northern Poland. It is located in the ethnocultural region of Kashubia in the historic region of Pomerania.

Six Polish citizens were murdered by Nazi Germany in the village during World War II.
