= Reskowo railway station =

Railway station in Reskowo, Poland

Reskowo

General information
- Location: Reskowo; Poland
- Owner: Polskie Koleje Państwowe S.A.

Construction
- Structure type: Building: No; Depot: Never existed Water tower: Never existed

History
- Former names: Röskau until 1945
Location

Reskowo is a non-operational PKP railway station in Reskowo (Pomeranian Voivodeship), Poland.

== Lines crossing the station ==
Start station	End station	Line type
Pruszcz Gdański	Łeba	Closed
