= Stary Dwór, Gmina Chmielno =

Stary Dwór Stôri Dwór
- Village
- Location within Poland
- Coordinates: 54°18′40″N 17°59′17″E
- Country: Poland
- Voivodeship: Pomeranian
- County: Kartuzy
- Gmina: Chmielno

Stary Dwór [ˈstarɨ ˈdvur] (Kashubian: Stôri Dwór) is a village in the administrative district of Gmina Chmielno, within Kartuzy County, Pomeranian Voivodeship, in northern Poland.

For details of the history of the region, see History of Pomerania.
