= Chmieleńskie Chrósty =

Chmieleńskie Chrósty Chmiéléńsczé-Chróstë
- Settlement
- Location within Poland
- Coordinates: 54°18′52″N 18°4′19″E
- Country: Poland
- Voivodeship: Pomeranian
- County: Kartuzy
- Gmina: Chmielno
- Elevation: 204 m (669 ft)
- Population: 35

Chmieleńskie Chrósty [xmjɛˈlɛɲskʲɛ ˈxrustɨ] (Kashubian: Chmiéléńsczé-Chróstë) is a settlement in the administrative district of Gmina Chmielno, within Kartuzy County, Pomeranian Voivodeship, in northern Poland.

For details of the history of the region, see History of Pomerania.
