= Koryta, Pomeranian Voivodeship =

Koryta Kòrëta
- Settlement
- Location within Poland
- Coordinates: 54°19′32″N 18°0′7″E
- Country: Poland
- Voivodeship: Pomeranian
- County: Kartuzy
- Gmina: Chmielno

Koryta [kɔˈrɨta] (Kashubian: Kòrëta) is a settlement in the administrative district of Gmina Chmielno, within Kartuzy County, Pomeranian Voivodeship, in northern Poland.

For details of the history of the region, see History of Pomerania.
