= Grodzisko, Kartuzy County =

Grodzisko Grodzëskò
- Settlement
- Location within Poland
- Coordinates: 54°19′8″N 17°59′47″E
- Country: Poland
- Voivodeship: Pomeranian
- County: Kartuzy
- Gmina: Chmielno

Grodzisko [ɡrɔˈd͡ʑiskɔ] (Kashubian: Grodzëskò) is a settlement in the administrative district of Gmina Chmielno, within Kartuzy County, Pomeranian Voivodeship, in northern Poland.

For details of the history of the region, see History of Pomerania.
