= Kożyczkowo =

Kożyczkowo Kòżëczkòwò
- Village
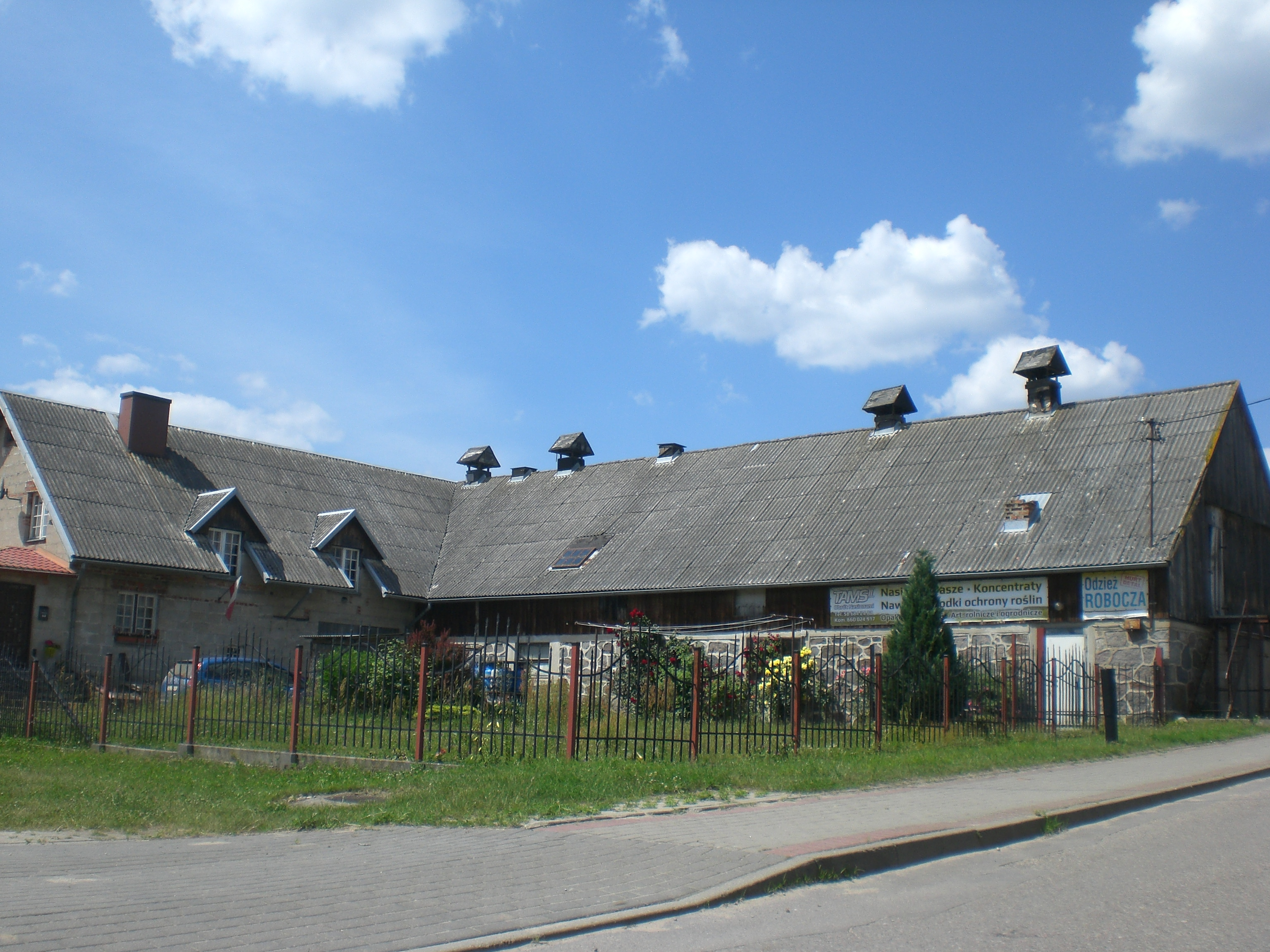

- Location within Poland
- Coordinates: 54°21′N 18°5′E
- Country: Poland
- Voivodeship: Pomeranian
- County: Kartuzy
- Gmina: Chmielno
- Population: 451

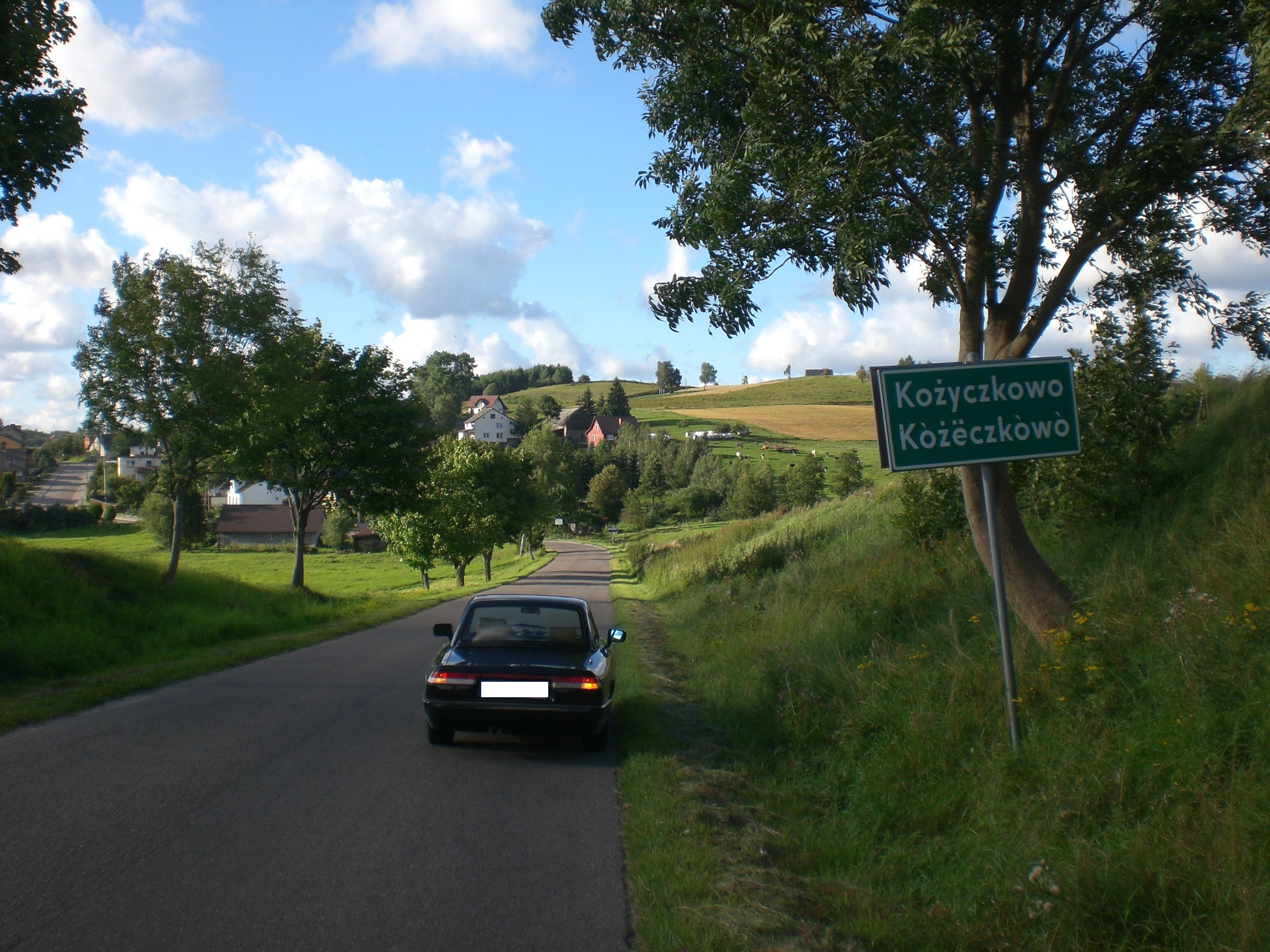
Kożyczkowo in Polish and Cashubian

Kożyczkowo [kɔʐɨt͡ʂˈkɔvɔ] (Kashubian: Kòżëczkòwò) is a village in the administrative district of Gmina Chmielno, within Kartuzy County, Pomeranian Voivodeship, in northern Poland.

For details of the history of the region, see History of Pomerania.
