= Przedsiębiorstwo Komunikacji Samochodowej =

Group of Polish transport companies

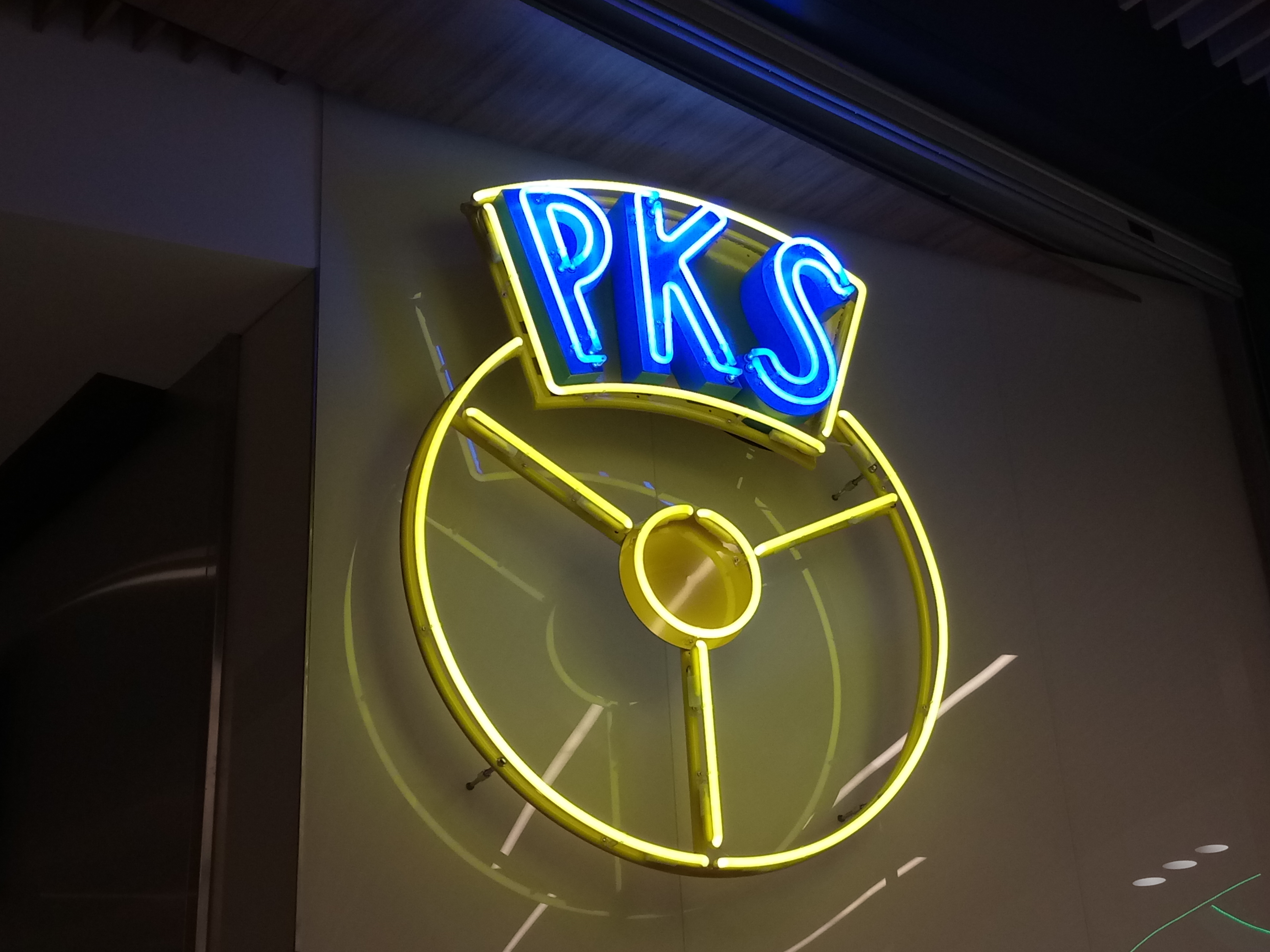
- Founded: 1945
- Service area: Poland
- Service type: Poland coach services

Przedsiębiorstwo Komunikacji Samochodowej (commonly abbreviated PKS, can be translated as Motor Transport Company) is a major Polish enterprise dealing with inter-city public transport using coaches.

== History ==
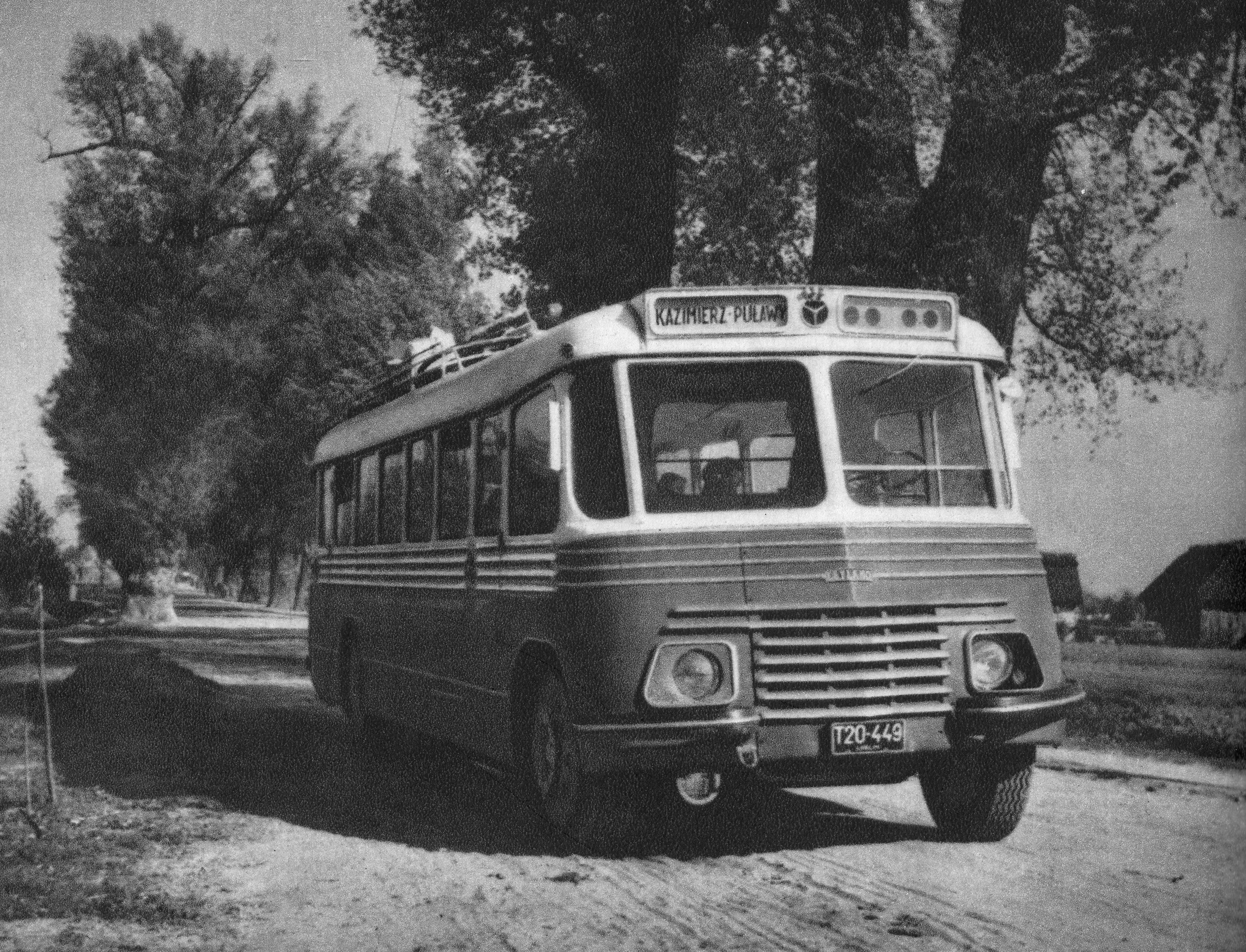
PKS bus, beginning of the 1950s

It was created as a state enterprise in 1945 in post-war communist Poland as Państwowa Komunikacja Samochodowa (State Motor Transport). Until 1989 it had a monopoly on suburban and interurban bus transport in Poland. After the fall of communism, PKS was divided into 176 local operations. In 1992 it was renamed to its current name. The local operations had different fates. Some were retained by the government, some were acquired by local authorities, some merged, some failed and others were acquired by outsiders such as Arriva or Connex. In 2020 about 100 'PKS' companies were still in existence although not all were still involved in transport. PKS Radom went bankrupt in 2022.

== Incidents ==
PKS buses were involved in two major accidents in Poland. The first one occurred in 1978, when two buses fell 18 m from a bridge into the Żywiec Lake, killing 30 people. In the other accident, known as the Poland bus disaster of 1994, an overcrowded bus driving at 60 km/h (10 km/h over the speed limit) collided with a tree, killing 32 people. This remains the worst road disaster in Poland's history.
