= Rekowo, Kartuzy County =

Rekowo Rekòwò
- Settlement
- Location within Poland
- Coordinates: 54°19′46″N 18°7′37″E
- Country: Poland
- Voivodeship: Pomeranian
- County: Kartuzy
- Gmina: Chmielno
- Population: 12

Rekowo [rɛˈkɔvɔ] (Kashubian: Rekòwò) is a settlement in the administrative district of Gmina Chmielno, within Kartuzy County, Pomeranian Voivodeship, in northern Poland.

For details of the history of the region, see History of Pomerania.
