= Młyn Dolny =

Młyn Dolny Dólny Młin
- Settlement
- Location within Poland
- Coordinates: 54°22′18″N 18°4′56″E
- Country: Poland
- Voivodeship: Pomeranian
- County: Kartuzy
- Gmina: Chmielno

Młyn Dolny [ˈmwɨn ˈdɔlnɨ] (Kashubian: Dólny Młin) is a settlement in the administrative district of Gmina Chmielno, within Kartuzy County, Pomeranian Voivodeship, in northern Poland.

For details of the history of the region, see History of Pomerania.
