= Maks =

- Settlement
- Location within Poland
- Coordinates: 54°16′11″N 18°3′13″E
- Country: Poland
- Voivodeship: Pomeranian
- County: Kartuzy
- Gmina: Chmielno

Maks [maks] is a settlement in the administrative district of Gmina Chmielno, within Kartuzy County, Pomeranian Voivodeship, in northern Poland.
