= Reskowo =

Reskowo Reskòwò
- Village
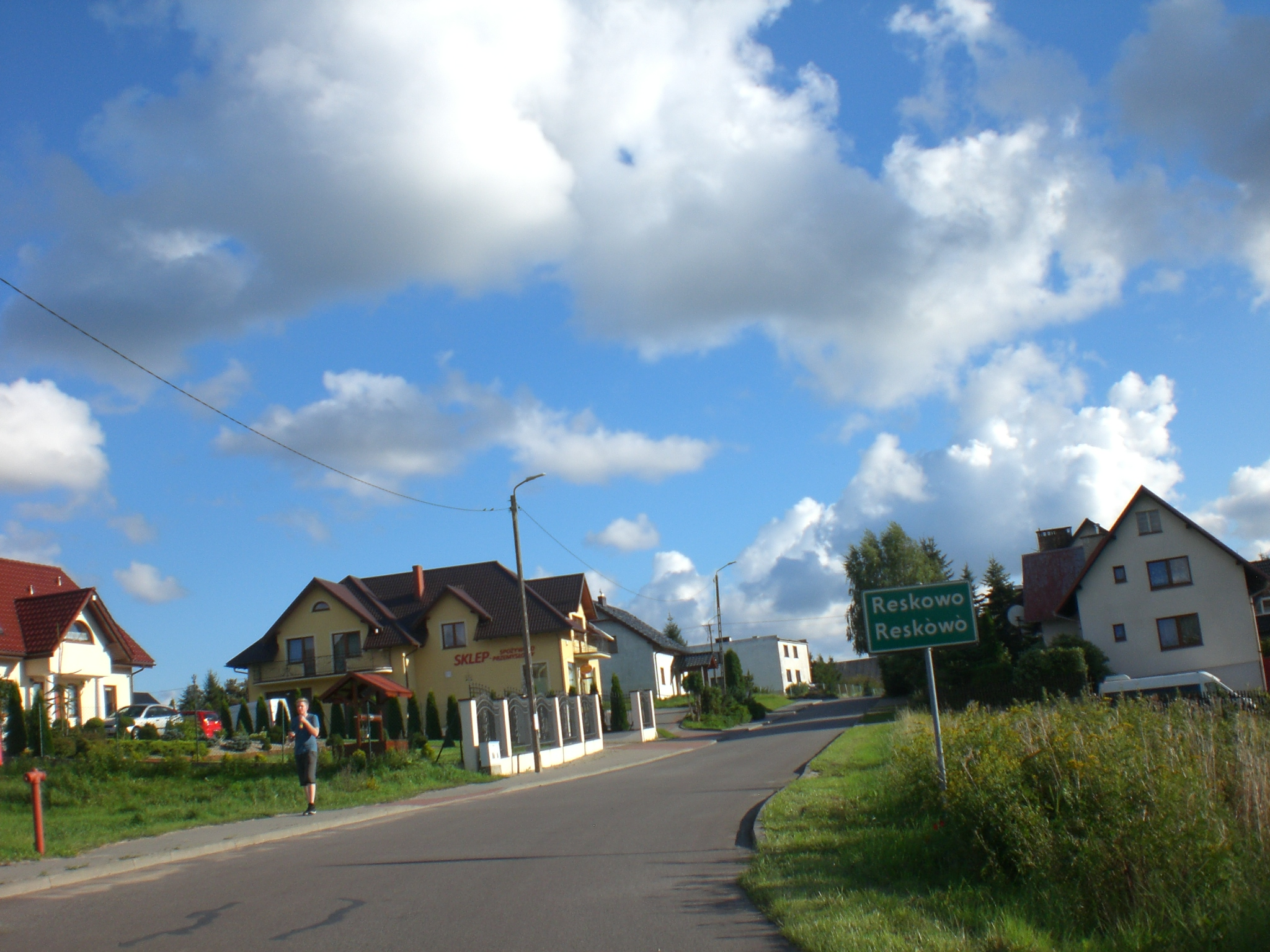

- Location within Poland
- Coordinates: 54°20′14″N 18°3′43″E
- Country: Poland
- Voivodeship: Pomeranian
- County: Kartuzy
- Gmina: Chmielno
- Population: 318

Reskowo [rɛsˈkɔvɔ] (Kashubian: Reskòwò) is a village in the administrative district of Gmina Chmielno, within Kartuzy County, Pomeranian Voivodeship, in northern Poland.

For details of the history of the region, see History of Pomerania.

== See also ==
- Reskowo railway station
