= Węgliska, Pomeranian Voivodeship =

Węgliska Wãglëska
- Settlement
- Location within Poland
- Coordinates: 54°19′20″N 18°4′27″E
- Country: Poland
- Voivodeship: Pomeranian
- County: Kartuzy
- Gmina: Chmielno

Węgliska [vɛnˈɡliska] (Kashubian: Wãglëska) is a settlement in the administrative district of Gmina Chmielno, within Kartuzy County, Pomeranian Voivodeship, in northern Poland.

For details of the history of the region, see History of Pomerania.
