= Gmina Chmielno =

Gmina Chmielno Chmielno Commune
- Gmina
- Coat of arms
- Interactive map of Gmina Chmielno
- Coordinates (Chmielno): 54°19′35″N 18°6′3″E
- Country: Poland
- Voivodeship: Pomeranian
- County: Kartuzy
- Seat: Chmielno

Area
  - Total: 79.18 km^{2} (30.57 sq mi)

Population (2006)
  - Total: 6,491
  - Density: 81.98/km^{2} (212.3/sq mi)
- Website: http://www.chmielno.pl/

Gmina Chmielno is a rural gmina (administrative district) in Kartuzy County, Pomeranian Voivodeship, in northern Poland. Its seat is the village of Chmielno, which lies approximately 7 kilometres (4 mi) west of Kartuzy and 35 km (22 mi) west of the regional capital Gdańsk.

The gmina covers an area of 79.18 square kilometres (30.6 sq mi), and as of 2006 its total population is 6,491.

The gmina contains part of the protected area called Kashubian Landscape Park.

== Villages ==
Gmina Chmielno contains the villages and settlements of Borzestowo, Borzestowska Huta, Chmieleńskie Chrósty, Chmielno, Chmielonko, Cieszenie, Dejk, Garcz, Glinno, Grodzisko, Haska, Koryta, Koszkania, Kożyczkowo, Łączyńska Huta, Lampa, Lipowiec, Maks, Miechucino, Miechucińskie Chrósty, Młyn Dolny, Młyn Górny, Przewóz, Rekowo, Reskowo, Rzym, Stary Dwór, Strysza Góra, Sznurki, Węgliska, Zajezierze and Zawory.

== Neighbouring gminas ==
Gmina Chmielno is bordered by the gminas of Kartuzy, Sierakowice and Stężyca.
