= Glinno, Pomeranian Voivodeship =

Glinno
- Settlement
- Location within Poland
- Coordinates: 54°20′47″N 17°59′51″E
- Country: Poland
- Voivodeship: Pomeranian
- County: Kartuzy
- Gmina: Chmielno

Glinno [ˈɡlinnɔ] is a settlement in the administrative district of Gmina Chmielno, within Kartuzy County, Pomeranian Voivodeship, in northern Poland.

For details of the history of the region, see History of Pomerania.
