= Koszkania =

Koszkania Koszkaniô
- Settlement
- Location within Poland
- Coordinates: 54°19′19″N 18°4′27″E
- Country: Poland
- Voivodeship: Pomeranian
- County: Kartuzy
- Gmina: Chmielno

Koszkania [kɔʂˈkaɲa] (Kashubian: Koszkaniô) is a settlement in the administrative district of Gmina Chmielno, within Kartuzy County, Pomeranian Voivodeship, in northern Poland.

For details of the history of the region, see History of Pomerania.
