= Borzestowska Huta =

Borzestowska Huta Bòrzestowskô Hëta
- Village
- Location within Poland
- Coordinates: 54°18′7″N 18°2′17″E
- Country: Poland
- Voivodeship: Pomeranian
- County: Kartuzy
- Gmina: Chmielno
- Population: 295

Borzestowska Huta [bɔʐɛsˈtɔfska ˈxuta] (Kashubian: Bòrzestowskô Hëta) is a village in the administrative district of Gmina Chmielno, within Kartuzy County, Pomeranian Voivodeship, in northern Poland.

For details of the history of the region, see History of Pomerania.
