= Strysza Góra =

Strysza Góra Strëszò Góra
- Settlement
- Location within Poland
- Coordinates: 54°20′46″N 18°2′25″E
- Country: Poland
- Voivodeship: Pomeranian
- County: Kartuzy
- Gmina: Chmielno

Strysza Góra [ˈstrɨʂa ˈɡura] (Kashubian: Strëszò Góra) is a settlement in the administrative district of Gmina Chmielno, within Kartuzy County, Pomeranian Voivodeship, in northern Poland.

For details of the history of the region, see History of Pomerania.
