= Miechucino =

Miechucino Miechùcëno
- Village
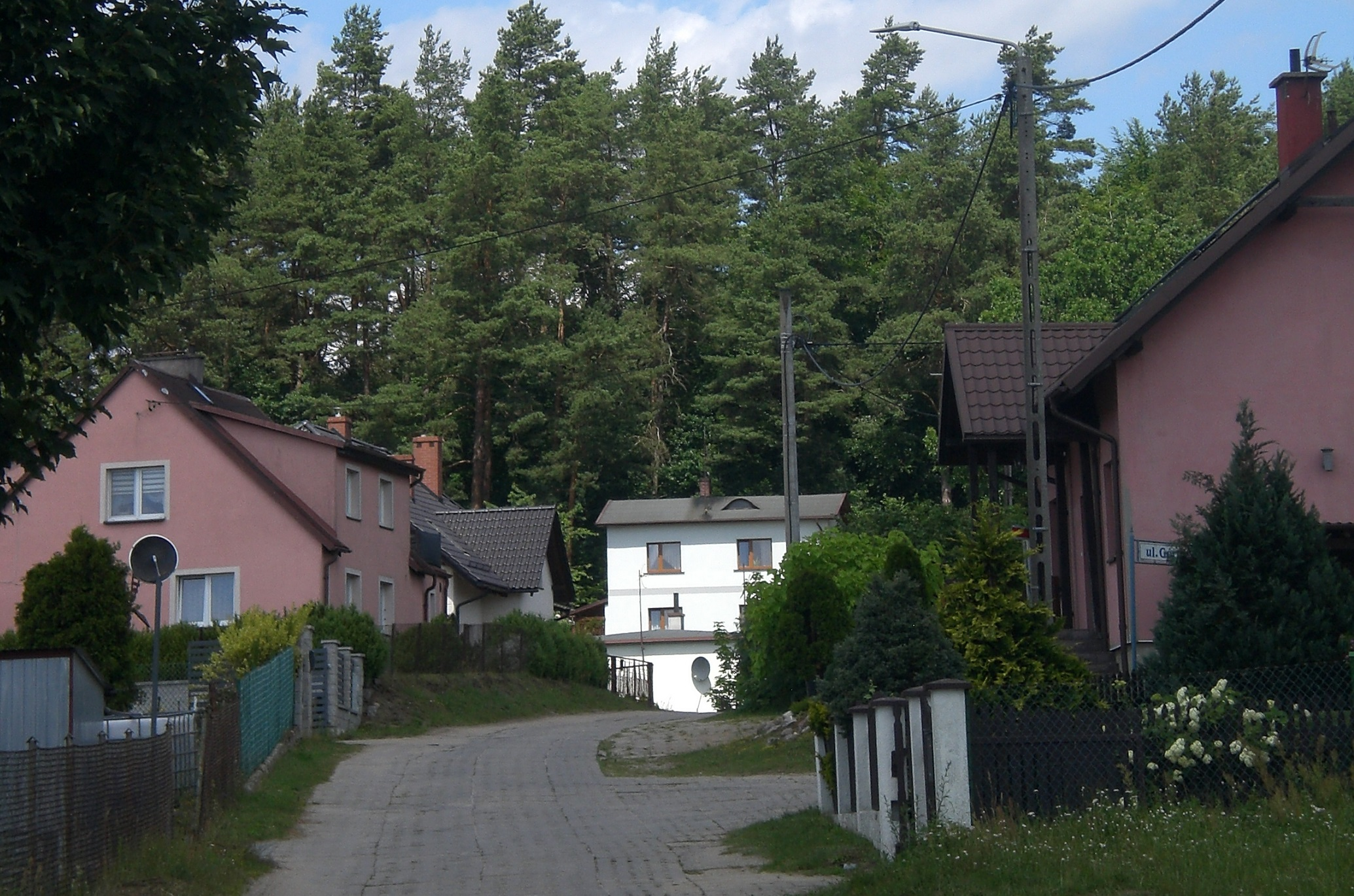

- Location within Poland
- Coordinates: 54°20′N 18°1′E
- Country: Poland
- Voivodeship: Pomeranian
- County: Kartuzy
- Gmina: Chmielno

Population
  - Total: 1,011

Miechucino [mjɛxuˈt͡ɕinɔ] (Kashubian: Miechùcëno) is a village in the administrative district of Gmina Chmielno, within Kartuzy County, Pomeranian Voivodeship, in northern Poland.

For details on the history of the region, see History of Pomerania.
