= Lampa, Pomeranian Voivodeship =

Lampa Lãpa
- Village
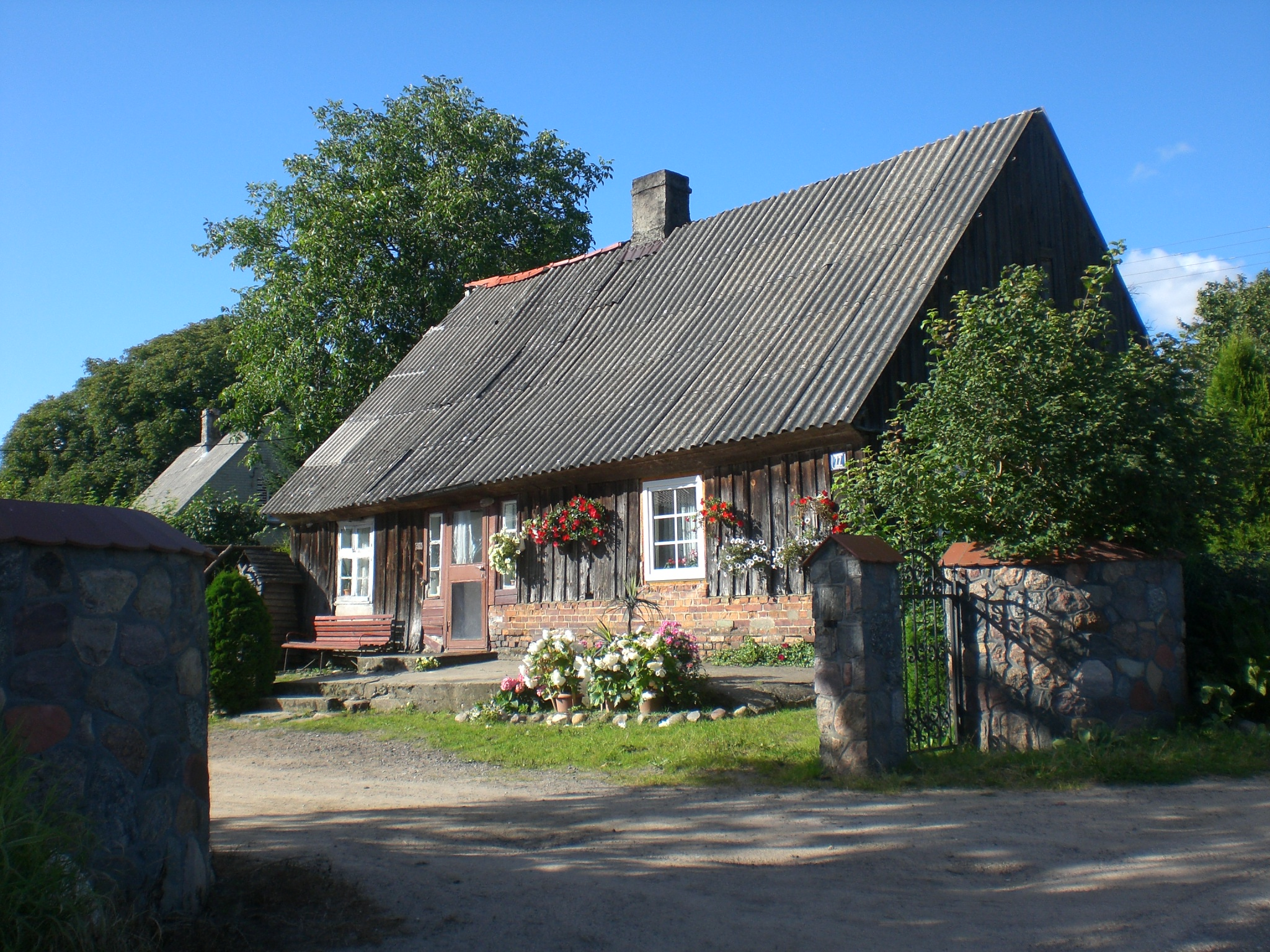

- Location within Poland
- Coordinates: 54°18′36″N 18°4′38″E
- Country: Poland
- Voivodeship: Pomeranian
- County: Kartuzy
- Gmina: Chmielno

Lampa [ˈlampa] (Kashubian: Lãpa) is a village in the administrative district of Gmina Chmielno, within Kartuzy County, Pomeranian Voivodeship, in northern Poland.

For details of the history of the region, see History of Pomerania.
