= Zawory, Pomeranian Voivodeship =

Zawory Zôwòrë
- Village
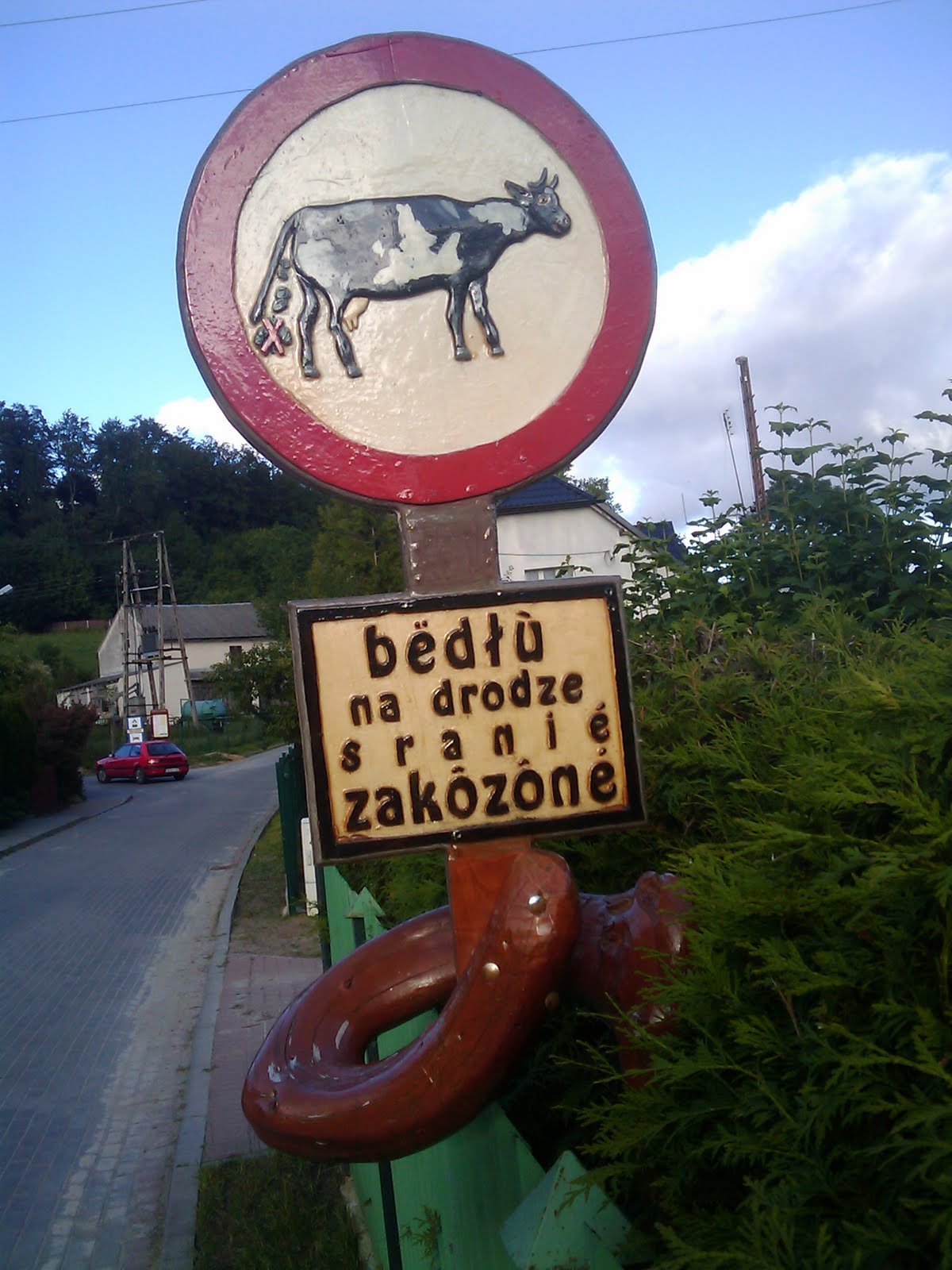

- Location within Poland
- Coordinates: 54°18′46″N 18°6′42″E
- Country: Poland
- Voivodeship: Pomeranian
- County: Kartuzy
- Gmina: Chmielno
- Elevation: 160.4 m (526 ft)
- Population: 394

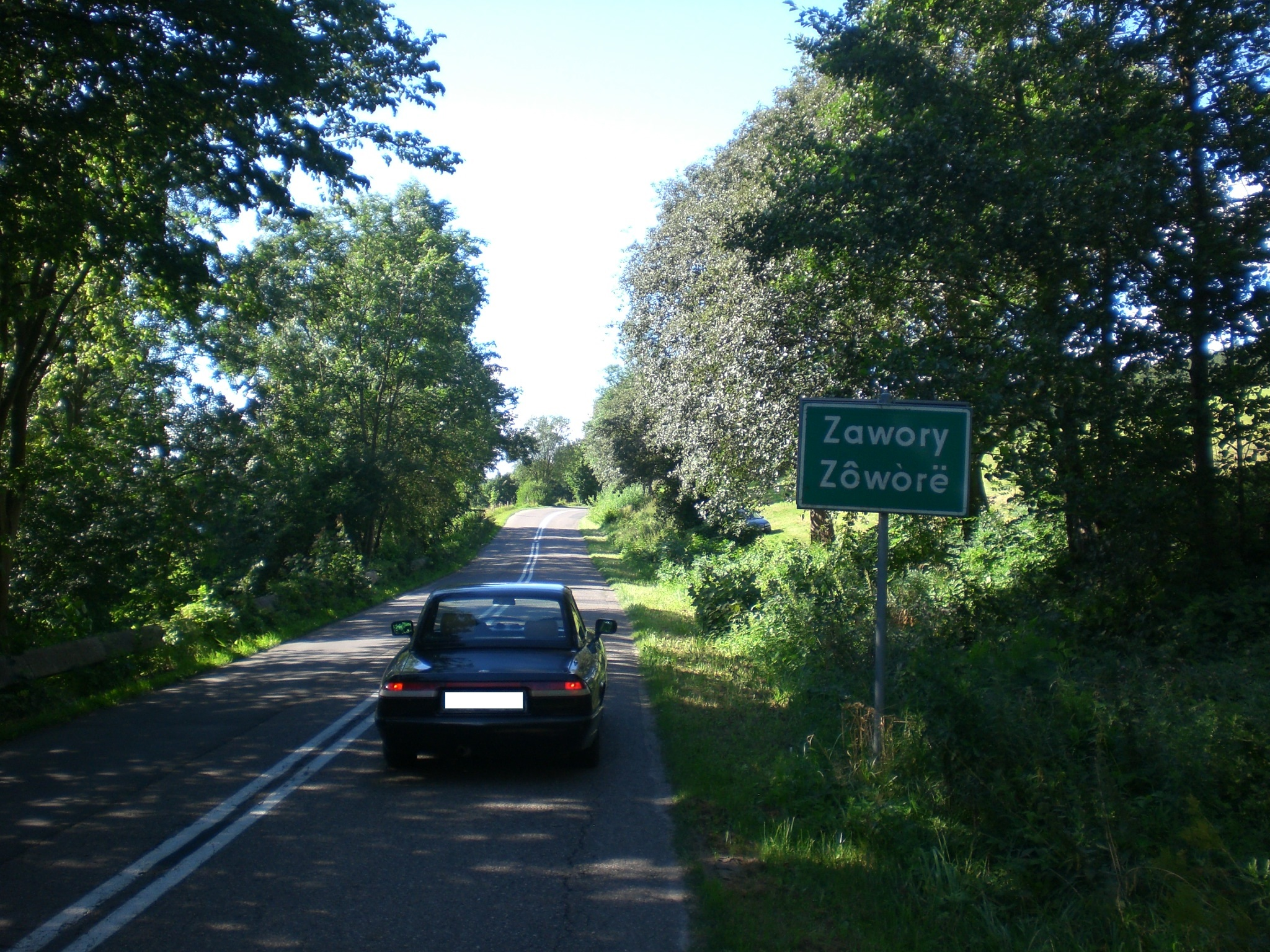
Zawory in Polish and Cashubian

Zawory [zaˈvɔrɨ] (Kashubian: Zôwòrë) is a village in Kartuzy County, Pomeranian Voivodeship, Kashubia in northern Poland. It is the seat of the gmina (administrative district) called Gmina Chmielno.

For details of the history of the region, see History of Pomerania.
