= Chmielno, Pomeranian Voivodeship =

Chmielno
- Village
- Location within Poland
- Coordinates: 54°19′35″N 18°6′3″E
- Country: Poland
- Voivodeship: Pomeranian
- County: Kartuzy
- Gmina: Chmielno
- Population: 1,580

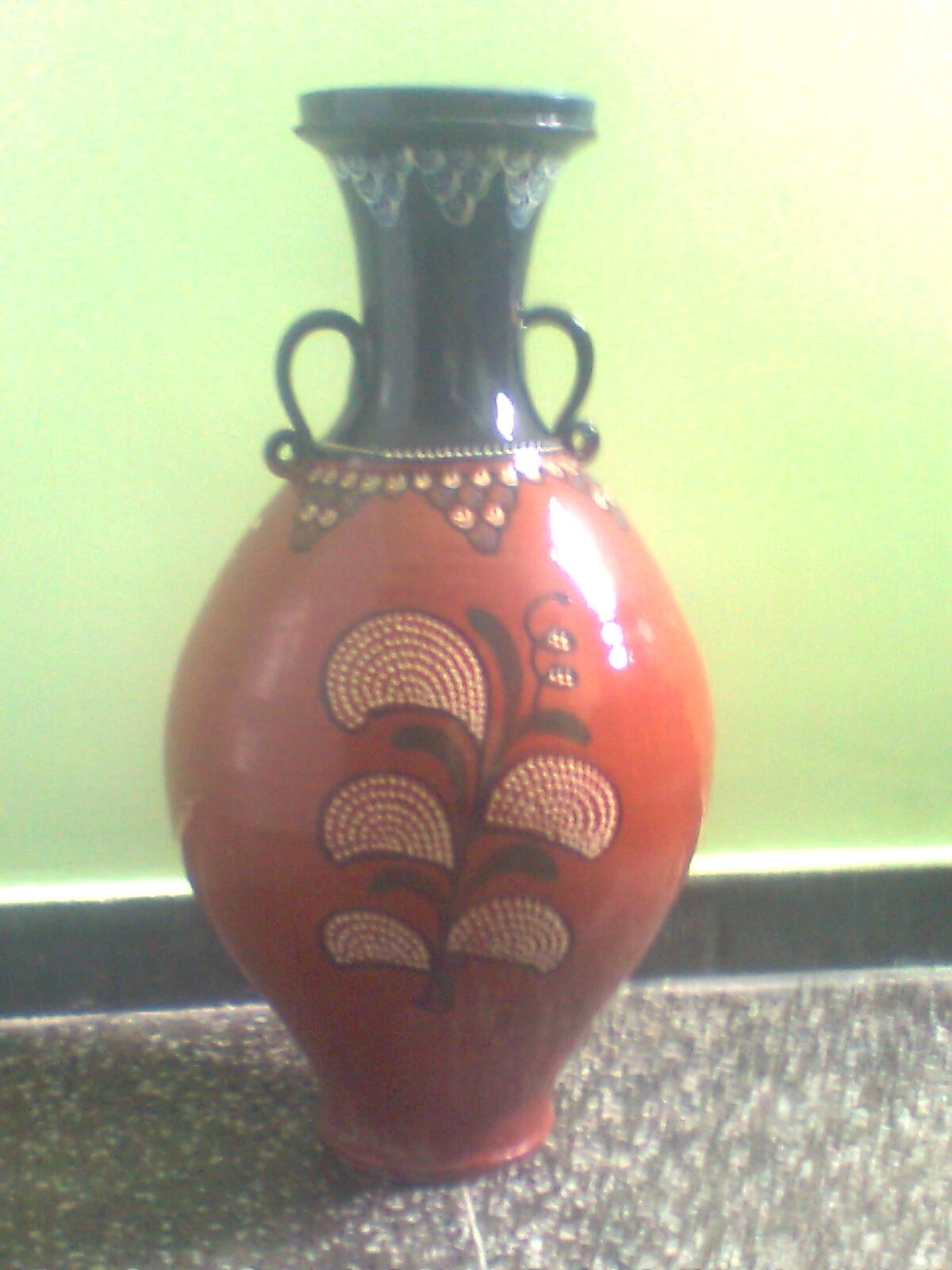
Chmielno's Pottery

Chmielno [ˈxmʲɛlnɔ] (Kashubian Chmielno) is a village in Kartuzy County, Pomeranian Voivodeship, Kashubia in northern Poland. It is the seat of the gmina (administrative district) called Gmina Chmielno.

Kashubian ceramics from Chmielno is characterized by the motifs of the Kashubian star, fish-scales, tulips, lilies, wreaths, lilac branches, all complemented by wavy lines and dots. For details of the history of the region, see History of Pomerania.
