= Garcz =

Garcz Gôrcz
- Village
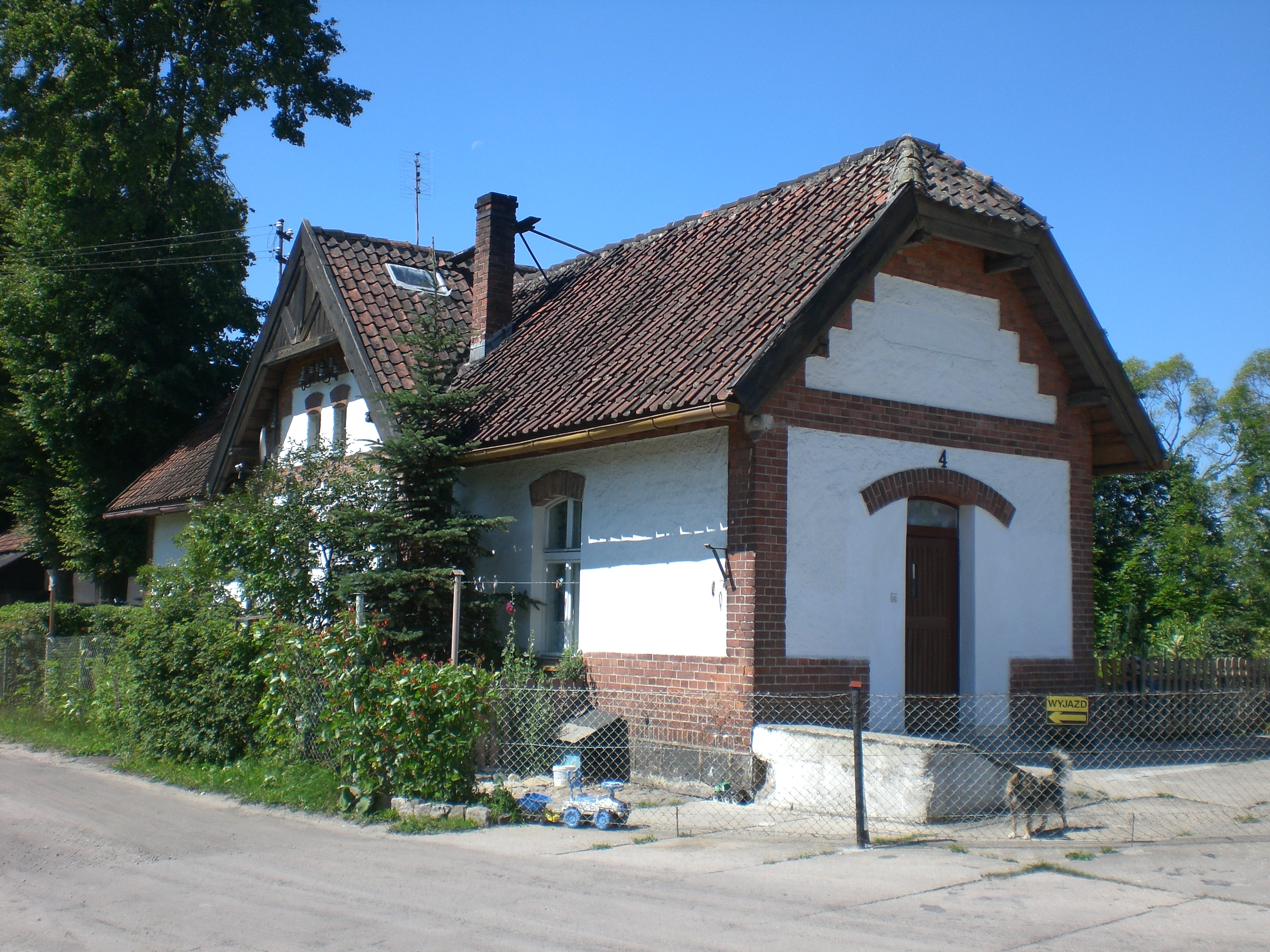

- Location within Poland
- Coordinates: 54°20′43″N 18°6′23″E
- Country: Poland
- Voivodeship: Pomeranian
- County: Kartuzy
- Gmina: Chmielno
- Population: 801

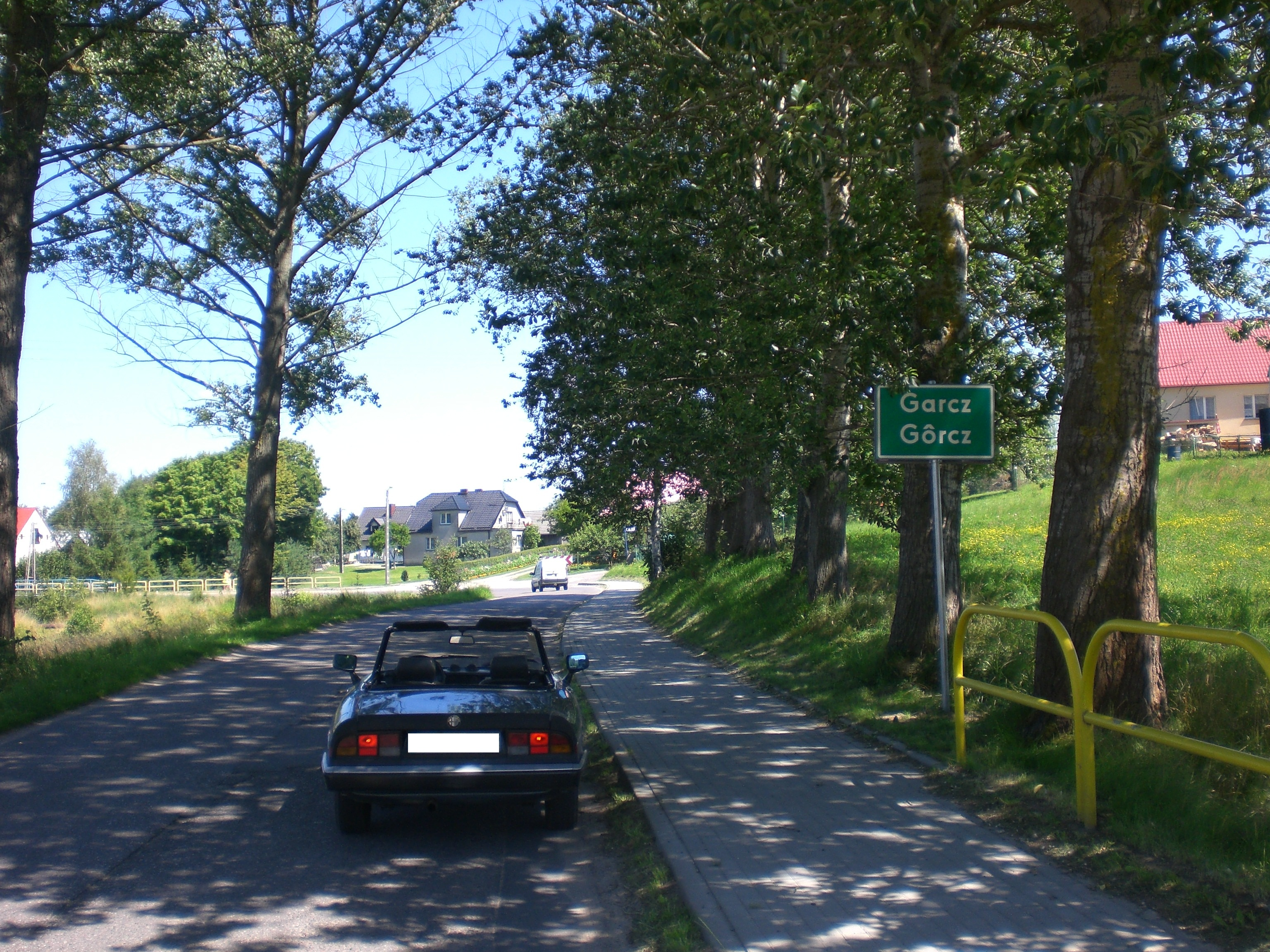
A bilingual roadsign with the village's name in Polish and Cashubian

Garcz [ɡart͡ʂ] (Kashubian: Gôrcz) is a village in the administrative district of Gmina Chmielno, within Kartuzy County, Pomeranian Voivodeship, in northern Poland.

For details of the history of the region, see History of Pomerania.
