= Lampa (film) =

1959 short film by Roman Polanski

- Directed by: Roman Polanski
- Written by: Roman Polanski
- Cinematography: Krzysztof Romanowski
- Release date: 1959
- Running time: 8 minutes
- Country: Poland

Lampa (English: The Lamp) is one of Polish director Roman Polanski's early short films. The eight-minute piece, released in 1959, was the diploma film of a classmate of his, Krzysztof Romanowski, who was the cinematographer of the film, but Polanski directed it.

== Plot ==
An elderly dollmaker is hard at work in his shop. Once he's headed off home, the film focuses on apparent whisperings amongst the miscellaneous doll-parts he's left behind. The shop then goes on to catch fire, but this remains unnoticed by the passers-by. Polanski can be glimpsed in a cameo role as a passer-by outside the shop.
