= Beheading the Kite =

Old ritual of northern Poland

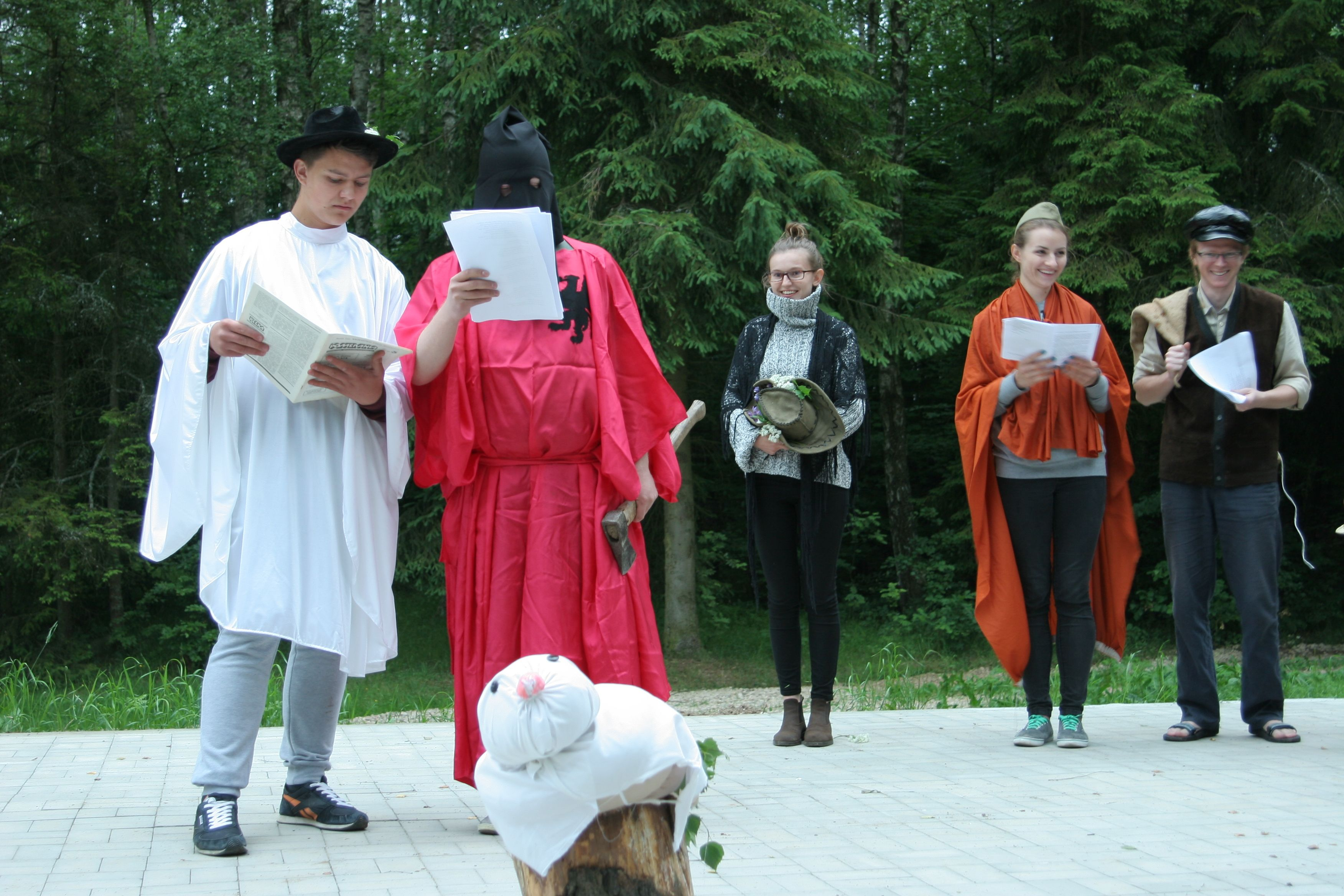
A sentence is read during beheading celebrations in Łączyńska Huta, June 2015.

Beheading the Kite (Kashubian: Scynanié kanie, Polish: ścinanie kani) is a Kashubian Midsummer Eve custom of ritually beheading a kite, a bird which in the Kashubian region used to symbolize evil. Since mid-19th century the ritual has become a part of Midsummer Eve, Whit Sunday or Corpus Christi celebrations. After all the residents have gathered, the village elder and village council publicly condemned the captured kite, blaming it for evil deeds, and sentenced it to death by beheading. Whenever a kite could not be captured alive, a hen or a crow could be used instead.

== The ritual ==
The ritual had most likely been meant as a warning, since the village elder reading the sentence would always allude to current events in the village and warn his people that doing the same deeds for which the kite was punished might bring similar punishment. The kite's bad reputation might be related to the fact that it is a bird of prey and was known for decimating poultry. Another hypothesis suggests that the bird was a harbinger of drought, since its cry was similar to the words "pi, pi" which mean "drink, drink" (cf. Polish: pij, pij). To prevent this disaster, the bird had to be killed. Nowadays the beheading of a kite is a public event, and an effigy is used instead of a live kite. Occasionally the bird is replaced with a red flower.

=== Name and origins ===
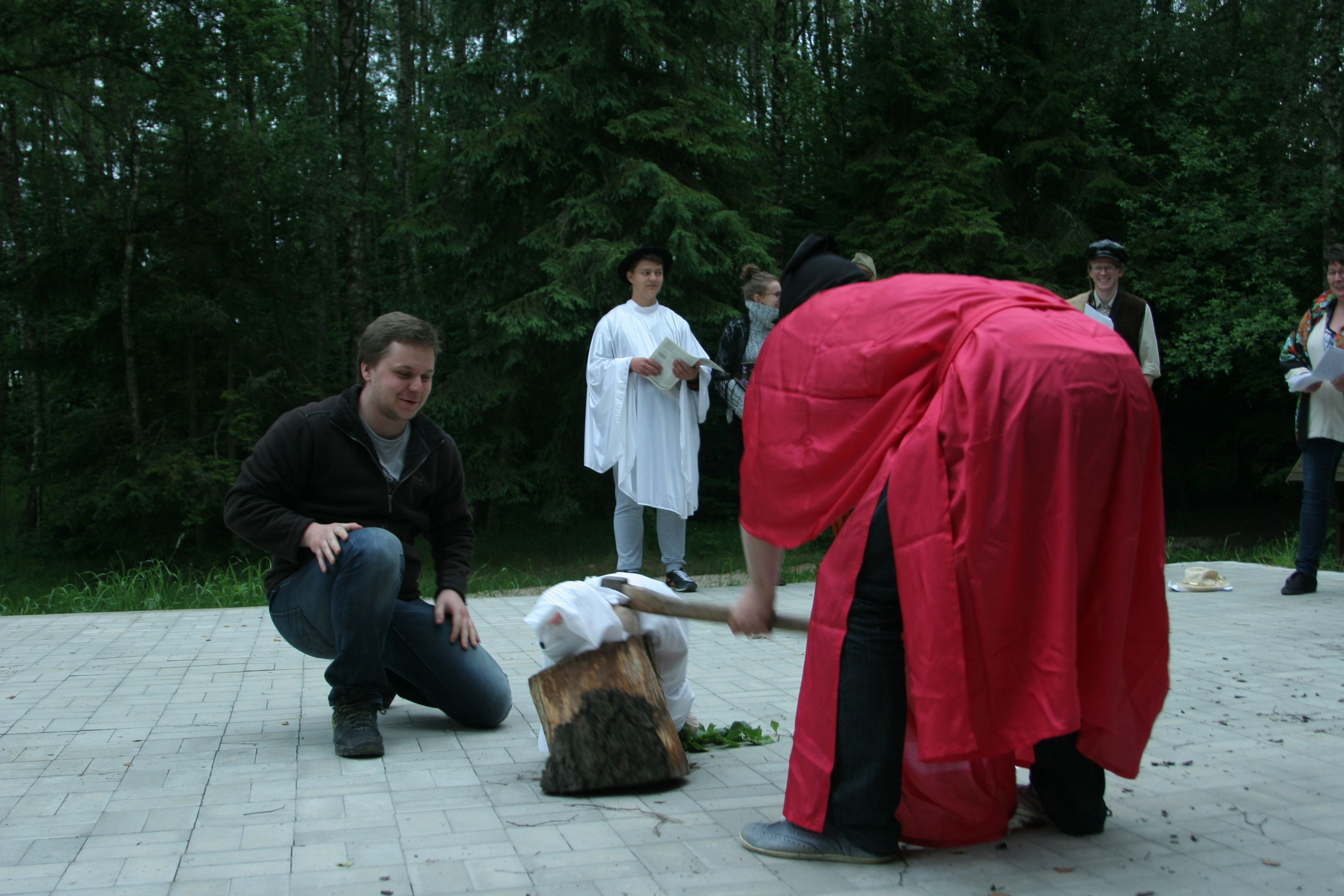
The Executioner is supposed to behead the kite with three blows.

The red kite (Milvus milvus) is a medium-large bird of prey in the hawks and eagles family, Accipitridae. Although found across Poland, it is relatively the most common in the Pomerania region. The bird feeds on small rodents, frogs, young and infirm birds and carrion. The kite's cry resembles "hee-ye". Kashubian folk tradition considered the bird to be antagonistic towards humans and their possessions; it was also associated with laziness. If a kite couldn't be procured for the ritual, a hen or a crow would be used instead. Today in Polish villages (e.g. in Łączyńska Huta) the kite is symbolized by an effigy stuffed with feathers.

The ritual was first mentioned in an 1851 text by Florian Ceynowa, who described the custom as it was in his home village. Also Jan Patock writes about the ritual in Dzień św. Jana na Kaszubach [St. John's Day in the Kashubia region] (1932). Today the custom takes place in summer, usually in June. Local activists, actors and volunteers perform in a number of Kashubian villages (Łączyńska Huta, Wdzydze Kiszewskie, Szymbark, Strzelno).

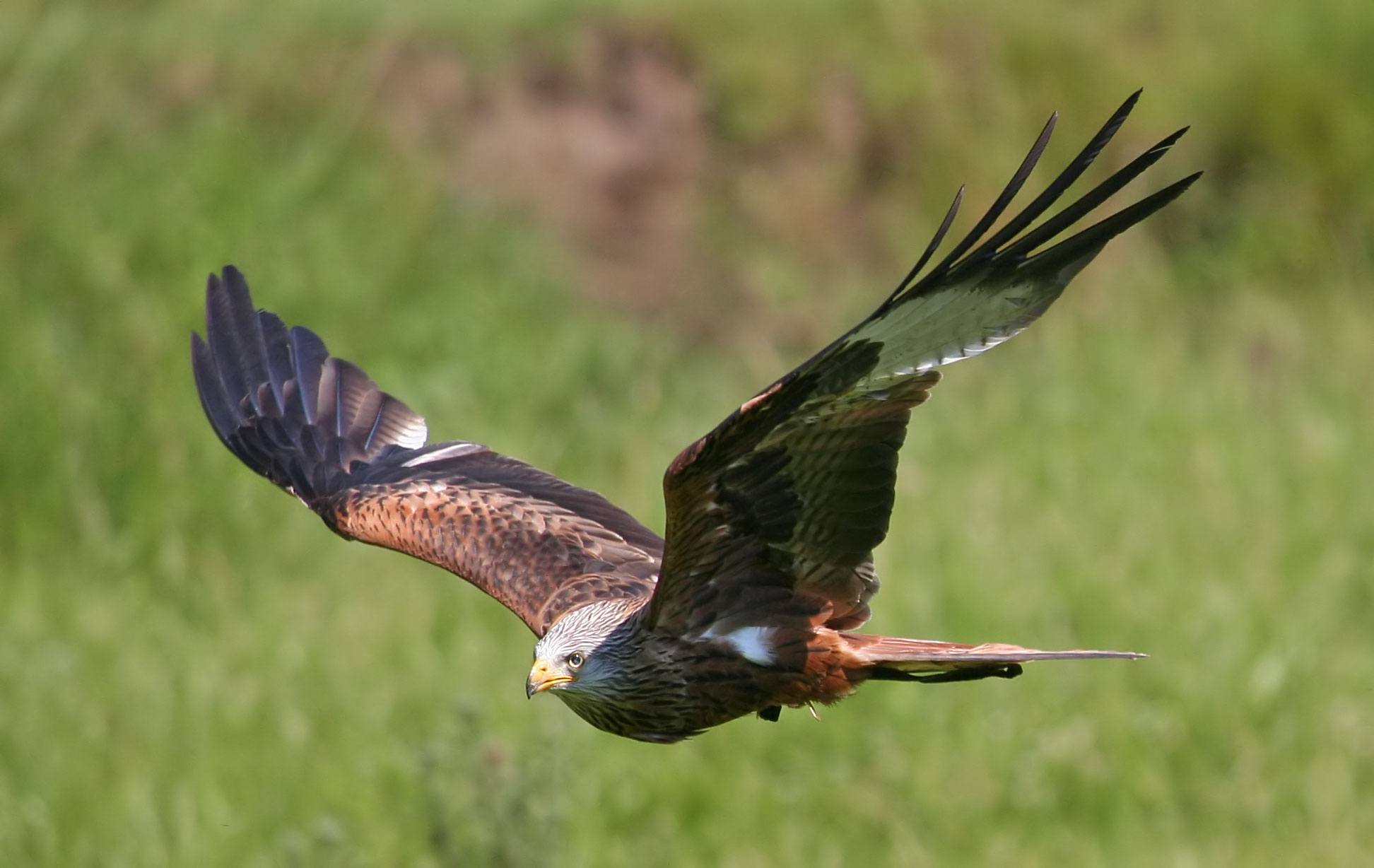
Red kite, the name-sake of the ritual

There are several legends concerning the rite's origins:

- Bernard Sychta, in Zbiór podań, opowieści i baśni kaszubskich [A collection of Kashubian tales and fables] writes about drought in the region so severe that lakes and rivers had dried out. God took pity on the birds dying of thirst and ordered them to dig wells. When all the birds began the work, the kite refused because it didn't want to get dirt on its legs. For this deed, the bird was punished and since then it can only drink water droplets from cracks in stones.
- In the northern part of the region the kite was identified with a woman: a local tale related to this belief is about Christ travelling with St. Peter and asking a woman for some water. When she refused to share it, she was punished by being turned into the bird.
- A story from the Kościerzyna area explains that the kite is an enchanted wizard, who possessed great knowledge and treasures. His spells stopped rains in the region. When he had been transformed into the kite, he was allowed to drink water only from cracks in stones. In summer he is very thirsty and cries: "pi, pi" which means "drink, drink".

=== Characters ===
Individual roles are assigned randomly by drawing lots or asking for volunteers (before or on the ritual day) and assigning the following roles:

- The Village Leader and his wife: Village leaders are usually the show's organisers – they are supposed to welcome and say goodbye to the guests. The leader announces the death sentence; he wears a hat adorned with flowers and ribbons. Together with the Executioner they are the most distinctive characters of the event.
- The Executioner and his wife: The Executioner beheads the kite, sometimes also announces the sentence. He wears red (sometimes white or black) clothes. He is armed with a sabre.
- The Judge and his wife: The Judge only appeared in the early 20th century. During the ritual the Judge demands information about the characters and the conduct of the other characters' wives. He wears white robes, sometimes with a cape. A chain made from gilded paper hangs around his neck.
- The Hunter and his wife: The Hunter is responsible for catching the kite and tying it to the pole. The Dog Catcher and the Hunter are sometimes described as the Executioner's help.
- The Game Warden and his wife: Helps the Hunter.
- The Dog Catcher and his wife: The Dog Catcher removes the dead kite. In some variations he may be replaced with the Digger and the Carrier with stretches.
- The Jew: A character wearing typical Jewish clothes, carrying a bag of cats on his back. He provides comic relief towards the ritual's end.

=== The course of the ritual ===
The original tradition was upheld until the 19th century. After Florian Ceynowa's publications in the mid 19th century (two articles in "Nadwiślanin" magazine), the ritual was resurrected by activists, members of pro-Kashubian organizations, employees of ethnographic and open-air museums. Today the tradition is based on Edmund Kamiński's text found in Jan Rompski's "Ścinanie kani. Kaszubski zwyczaj ludowy" [Beheading a kite: A Kashubian folk tradition].

The ritual usually takes place on a meadow, possibly near water. A podium decorated with plants is placed there. Local women bring high men's hats decorated with colorful strings. Each woman aims for her hat to be the prettiest. The hats are to be worn by the future "husbands" during the ritual. A pole to which the kite will be tied is placed in the centre. The village leader or the executioner begin to circle around the pole, driving the audience away with a sabre to make room. Then, wives are selected for the actors. Women approach a box with tickets and draw one, and the selection is confirmed by the village leader. Having selected the husbands, the women form a circle and sing together.

The village leader gives a speech; this is a solemn moment. The executioner accuses the kite of various crimes and the judgement begins. The prosecutor – village leader – points out all the crimes the kite had committed. In addition to the damage done to poultry and cattle, there are also allusions to young women. The village leader addresses the community and pronounces the kite guilty of all the sins, and sentences it to death. The people applaud. After securing an agreement to proceed with the execution, the executioner attempts to kill the kite with three strikes (the Executioner who does not manage to kill the kite with up to three strikes will be laughed at). The Executioner wraps the beheaded bird and its head in white cloth and carries it to a grave, where the catcher buries it. Finally the village leader thanks the audience for attending; the actors and all participants make a bonfire and celebrate.
