= Bernard Sychta =

Kashubian activist

- Bernat Zëchta
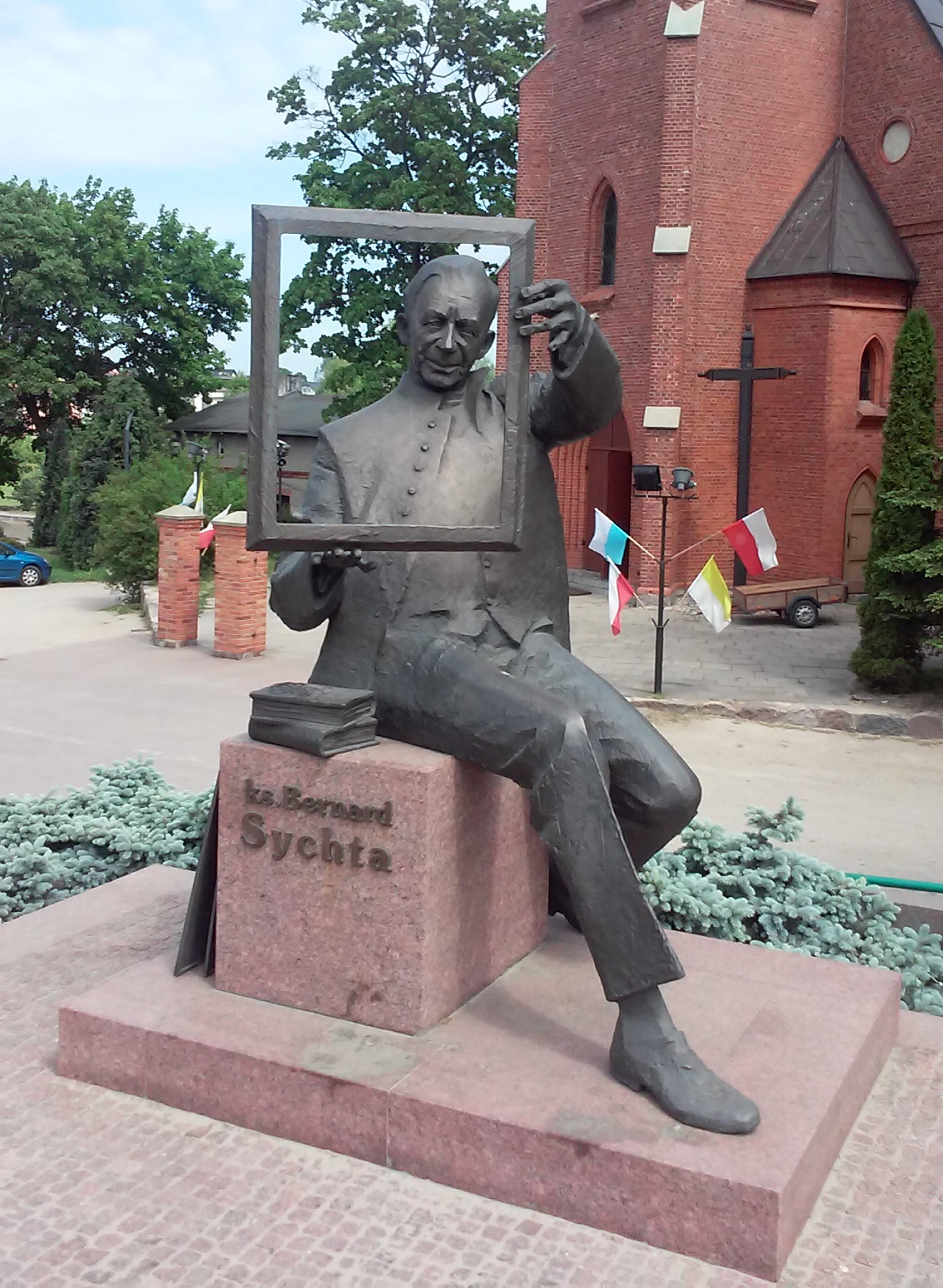
- A statue of Sychta in Sierakowice
- Born: 21 March 1907; Pusdrowo, Kreis Karthaus, German Empire
- Died: 25 November 1982 (aged 75); Gdańsk, Gdańsk Voivodeship, Polish People's Republic
- Era: 20th century
- Organization: Kashubian–Pomeranian Association

Academic background
- Education: University of Poznań
- Thesis: Materialna kultura ludowa Borów Tucholskich na tle etnografii kaszubskiej i kociewskiej (1947)
- Doctoral advisor: Roman Pollak

Religious life
- Religion: Christianity
- Denomination: Catholicism
- Church: Latin Church
- Ordination: 1932

Senior posting
- Post: Diocese of Pelplin
- Period in office: 1947–1982
- Previous post: Diocese of Chełmno (from 1934)

Bernard Sychta (Kashubian: Bernat Zëchta; 1907 – 1982) was a Kashubian activist, ethnographer, linguist, and Catholic priest. He studied the West Slavic groups of Kashubs, Kocievians, and Tuchola Borowians, inhabiting the Pomeranian region of Central Europe. He was the author of dictionaries of the Kashubian and Kocievian languages and wrote the Kocievian national anthem.

== Biography ==
=== Early life and education ===
Sychta was born on 21 March 1907 into a Kashub family, in what was then, Pusdrowo, German Empire. He was one of thirteen siblings, to his mother Anna (née Karszna) and father Jan, a farmer and business owner. As a child, Sychta attended the local school in Pusdrowo before enrolling at gymnasiums in the Free City of Danzig and Wejherowo. Whilst still a student, he began producing his first works, including a Kashubian nativity play in 1925, which was staged by students at the Wejherowo gymnasium. In 1928, Sychta began studying theology and philosophy at the seminary in Pelplin.

=== WWII ===
At the outbreak of World War II Sychta was being treated for typhus at a hospital in Toruń. After the hospital was evacuated, he hid from the Nazis in a safehouse in Preußisch Stargard until 1941, before finding shelter in Osche for the remainder of the war.

=== Post-war ===
After the liberation of Poland, Sychta took up ethographic studies at the University of Poznań, where he completed a masters degree based on the work of Eugeniusz Frankowski. He went on to defend his doctoral dissertation there in 1947, under the literary historian Roman Pollak. Sychta then became a lecturer in psychiatry at the seminary in Pelplin. Whilst there, he gained qualifications in psychology, psychopathology, and psychiatry from the Akademia Lekarska. During his time in Pelplin, Sychta conducted numerous ethnographic studies of the language and folklore of the Kashubian and Kocievian peoples.

=== Priesthood ===
Sychta entered the priesthood at the age of 25. His first posting was to a parish in the Kocievian town of Świecie, then to Sarnowo in Chełmno Land, before returning to Świecie in 1934. The following year, he was appointed to the psychiatric hospital in Starogard. In 1960, he was appointed a Papal Chamberlain by Pope John XXIII.

=== Retirement ===
On retirement, Sychta became an honorary member of the Gdańsk Scientific Society, and the Kashubian–Pomeranian Association. In 1981 he received an honorary degree from the University of Gdańsk in recognition for his work on the ethnography of the Kashubian and Kocievian minorities.

== Legacy ==
Sychta's doctoral thesis, published as Kultura materialna Borów Tucholskich na tle etnografii kaszubskiej i kociewskiej (1998), has become the primary source for the reconstruction of the folk costume of Kociewie. In recognition of his life's work there is a plaque dedicated to Sychta on his former residence in Pelplin. In 2015, a monument was also erected in Sierakowice in recognition of Sychta's contribution to Kashubian culture.
