= Puzdrowo =

Village in Kashubia

Puzdrowo Pùzdrowò
- Village
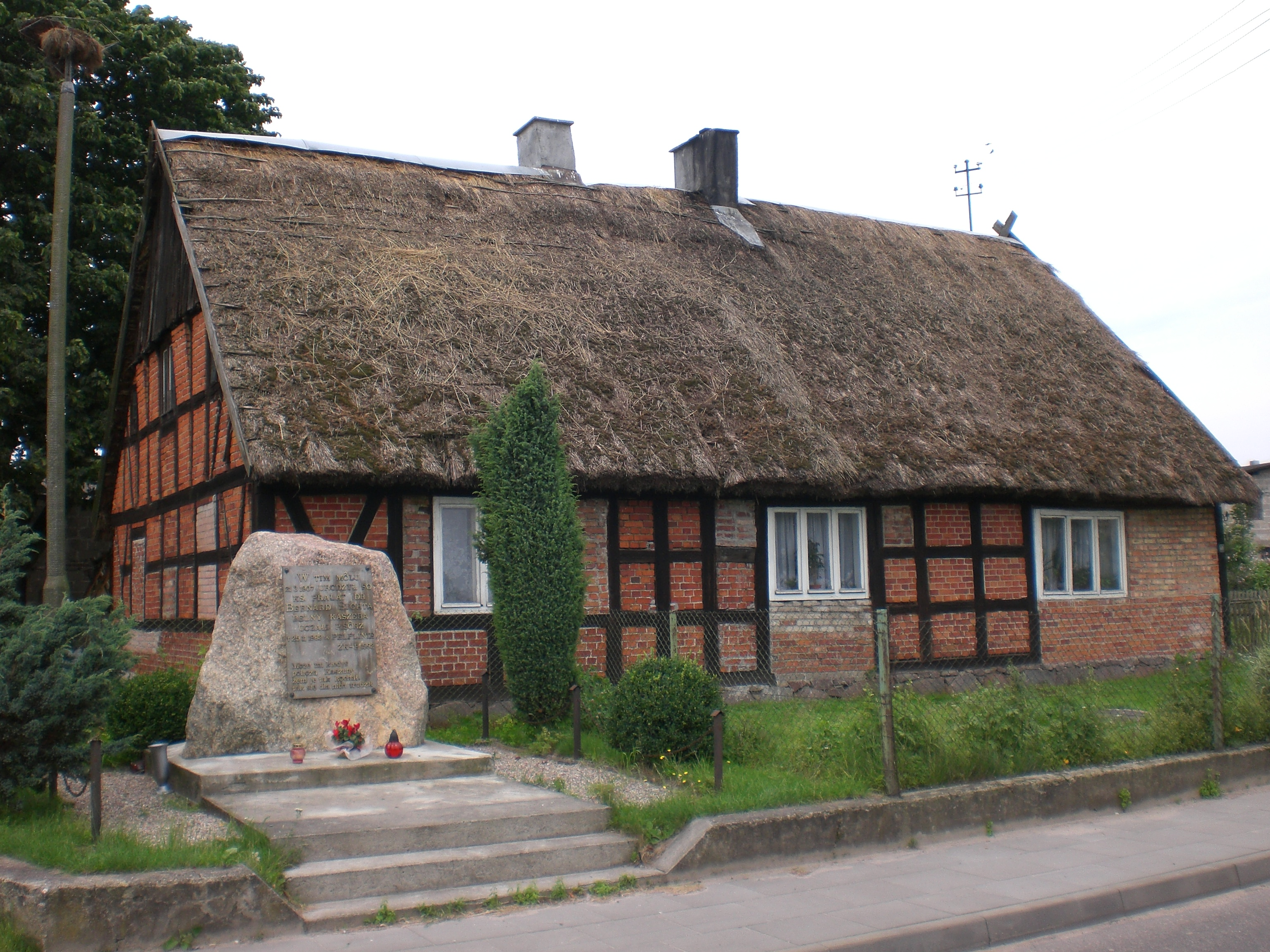
- The birthplace of Kashubian activist and writer Bernard Sychta

- Location within Poland
- Coordinates: 54°20′N 17°51′E
- Country: Poland
- Voivodeship: Pomeranian
- County: Kartuzy
- Gmina: Sierakowice
- Population: 810
- Time zone: UTC+1 (CET)
  - Summer (DST): UTC+2 (CEST)
- Vehicle registration: GKA

Puzdrowo [puzˈdrɔvɔ] is a village in the administrative district of Gmina Sierakowice, within Kartuzy County, Pomeranian Voivodeship, in northern Poland. It is located in the ethnocultural region of Kashubia in the historic region of Pomerania.

== History ==
Puzdrowo was a private village of the Polish nobility, administratively located in Mirachowo County in the Pomeranian Voivodeship of the Kingdom of Poland.

During the German occupation of Poland (World War II), in 1939, some Poles from Puzdrowo were among the victims of a massacre committed by the Germans in nearby Kaliska as part of the genocidal Intelligenzaktion campaign.
