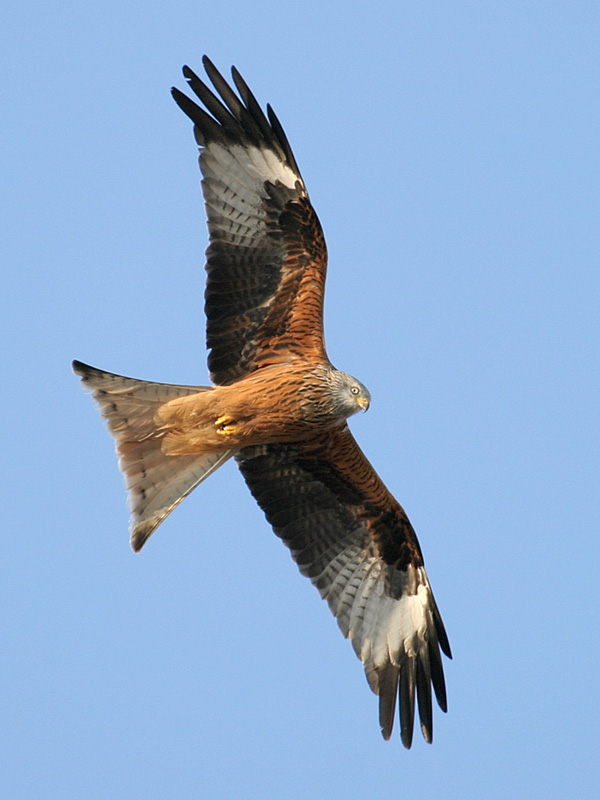
- In flight over Chemnitz, Saxony, Germany

Conservation status
- Least Concern (IUCN 3.1)

Scientific classification
- Kingdom: Animalia
- Phylum: Chordata
- Class: Aves
- Order: Accipitriformes
- Family: Accipitridae
- Genus: Milvus
- Species: M. milvus

Binomial name
- Milvus milvus (Linnaeus, 1758)
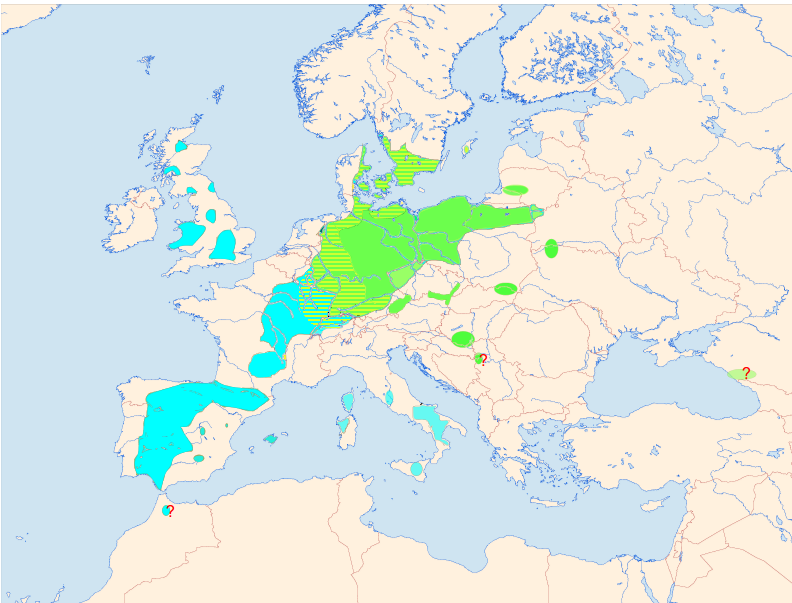
- Range of M. milvus Resident Summer breeding visitor, some migrating elsewhere during winter

Synonyms
- Falco milvus Linnaeus, 1758; Milvus regalis (Pall., 1811)

= Red kite =

Red kite Temporal range: Chibanian–present (Note: Fossil remains are known from between 130 and 10 thousand years ago.)

Species of bird

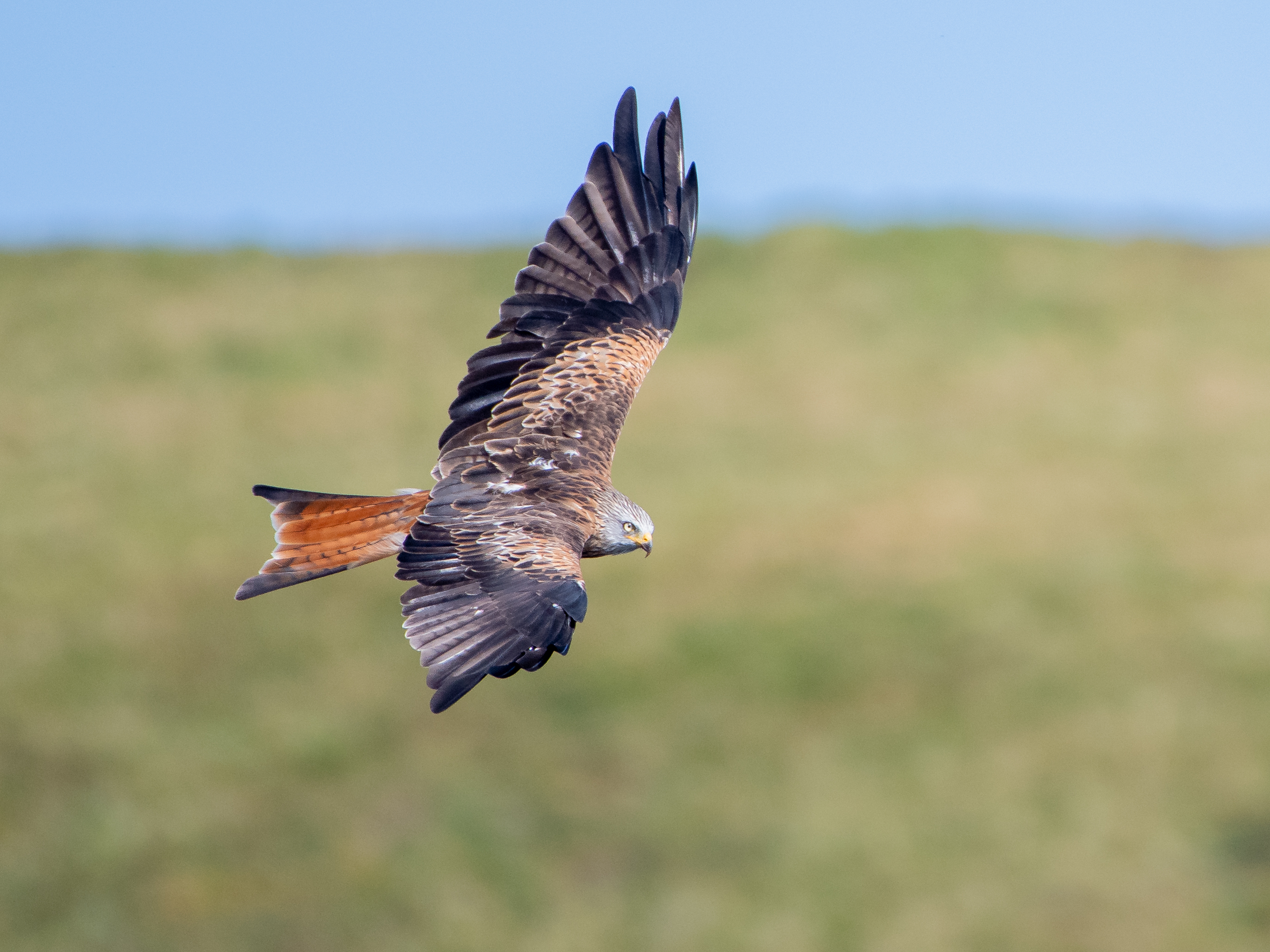
Red Kite at Bwlch Nant yr Arian, Wales, a local feeding ground.

The red kite (Milvus milvus) is a bird of prey in the family Accipitridae, which also includes many other diurnal raptors such as eagles, buzzards, and harriers. The species currently breeds only in Europe, though it formerly also bred in West Asia and Northwest Africa. Historically, it was only resident in the milder parts of its range in Western Europe and Northwestern Africa, whereas all or most red kites in Northern mainland Europe wintered to the south and west, some also reaching western Asia, but an increasing number of northern birds now remain in that region year-round. Vagrants have reached north to Finland and south to Israel, Libya and the Gambia.

== Etymology ==
The word ‘kite’ is derived from the Anglo-Saxon word ‘cyta’ which may be an onomatopoeic of the bird’s call, or may have derived from the Aryan word ‘skut’ meaning ‘to shoot’ or ‘to go swiftly.’ The word ‘kite’ evolved to its modern-day form from the word ‘cyta’ through the medieval word ‘kyte.’

A kite is mentioned by Geoffrey Chaucer in his Knight's Tale. The early 15th century Hengwrt manuscript contains the lines: "Ther cam a kyte, whil þt they were so wrothe That bar awey the boon bitwix hem bothe." The first recorded use of the word kite for the human-operated aerial device dates from the 17th century.

== Taxonomy ==
The red kite was described by the Swedish naturalist Carl Linnaeus in 1758 in the 10th edition of his Systema Naturae under the binomial name Falco milvus. The word milvus was the Latin name for the bird. In 1799 the French naturalist Bernard Germain de Lacépède moved the species to the genus Milvus creating the tautonym.

Two subspecies are recognised:

- M. m. milvus (Linnaeus, 1758) – Europe and Northwest Africa to the Middle East
- M. m. fasciicauda Hartert, 1914 – the Cape Verde Islands

The subspecies M. m. fasciicauda is almost certainly extinct.

The genus Milvus contains two other species: the black kite (M. migrans) and the yellow-billed kite (M. aegyptius). The red kite has been known to successfully hybridize with the black kite in captivity where both species were kept together, and in the wild on the Cape Verde Islands and infrequently in other places.

=== Cape Verde kites ===
The red kites on the Cape Verde Islands are (or rather were) quite distinct in morphology, being somewhat intermediate with black kites. The question whether the Cape Verde kite should be considered a distinct species (Milvus fasciicauda) or a red kite subspecies has not been settled. A mitochondrial DNA study on museum specimens suggested that Cape Verde birds did not form a monophyletic lineage among or next to red kites. This interpretation is problematic: mtDNA analysis is susceptible to hybridization events, the evolutionary history of the Cape Verde population is not known, and the genetic relationship of red kites is confusing, with geographical proximity being no indicator of genetic relatedness and the overall genetic similarity high, perhaps indicating a relict species. Given the morphological distinctness of the Cape Verde birds and that the Cape Verde population was isolated from other populations of red kites, it cannot be conclusively resolved as to whether the Cape Verde population was not a distinct subspecies (as M. migrans fasciicauda) or even a species that frequently absorbed stragglers from the migrating European populations into its gene pool. The Cape Verde population became effectively extinct since 2000, all surviving birds being hybrids with black kites.

=== Hybridisation ===
The genus Milvus contains two other species: the black kite (M. migrans) and the yellow-billed kite (M. aegyptius). The red kite has been known to successfully hybridize with the black kite in captivity where both species were kept together, and in the wild on the Cape Verde Islands and in other places.

A hybrid zone in which red and black kites occasionally mate exists in Central Europe. A genetic study of kites in this area did not demonstrate any mtDNA from black kites in red kites or vice versa. As this DNA is inherited from the mother, the authors of the study which found these results suggested that female F1 hybrids were infertile in accordance with Haldane's law.

A hybridisation event leading to the successful fledging of two chicks occurred between a male black kite and a female red kite in Scotland in 2006. Scotland is not home to a breeding population of black kites, and it is likely the male was blown off course by a storm or became lost during migration.

== Description ==
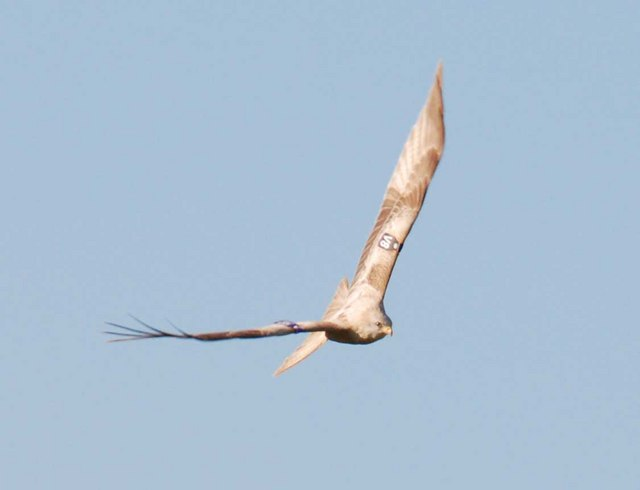
Leucistic form

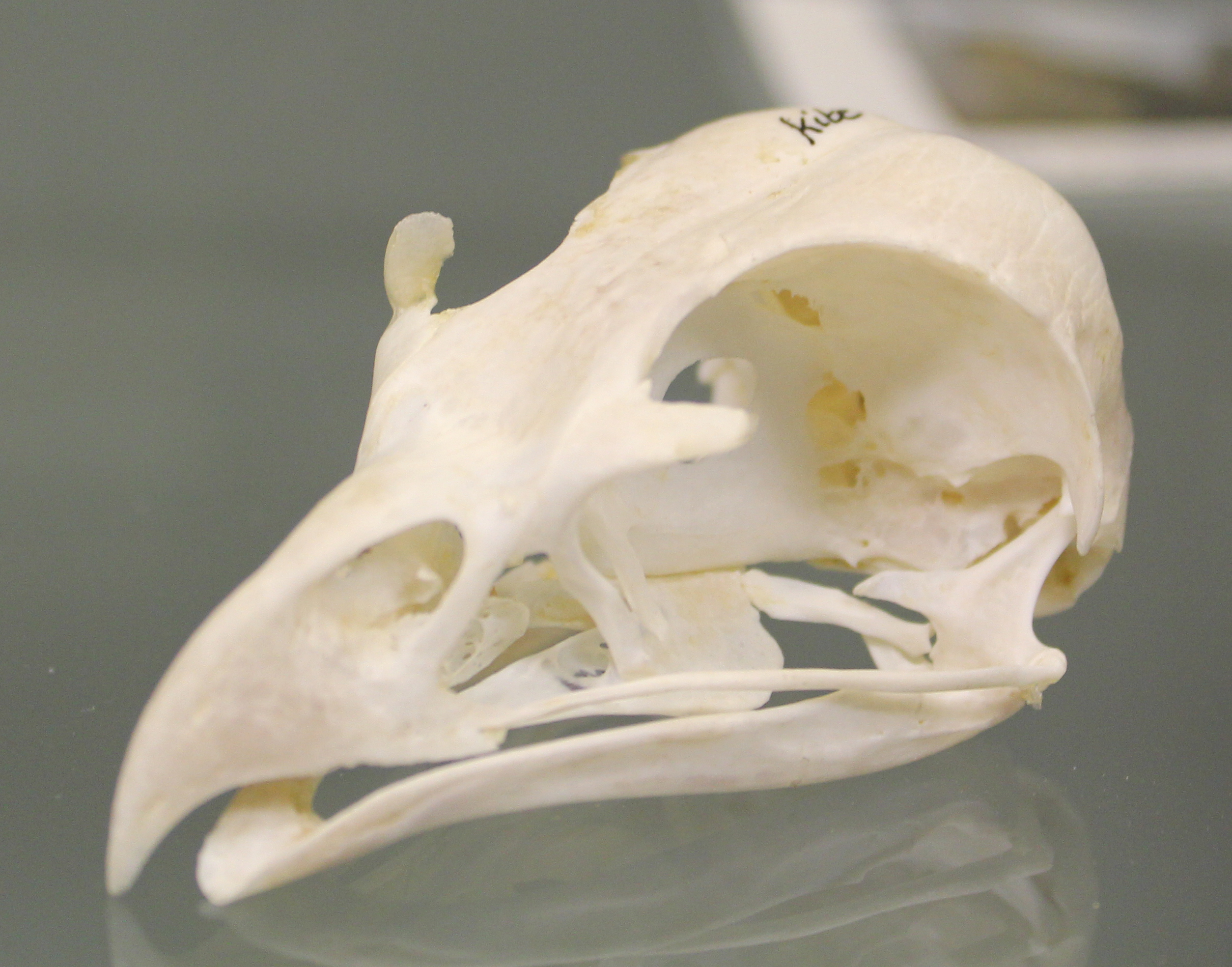
A red kite skull

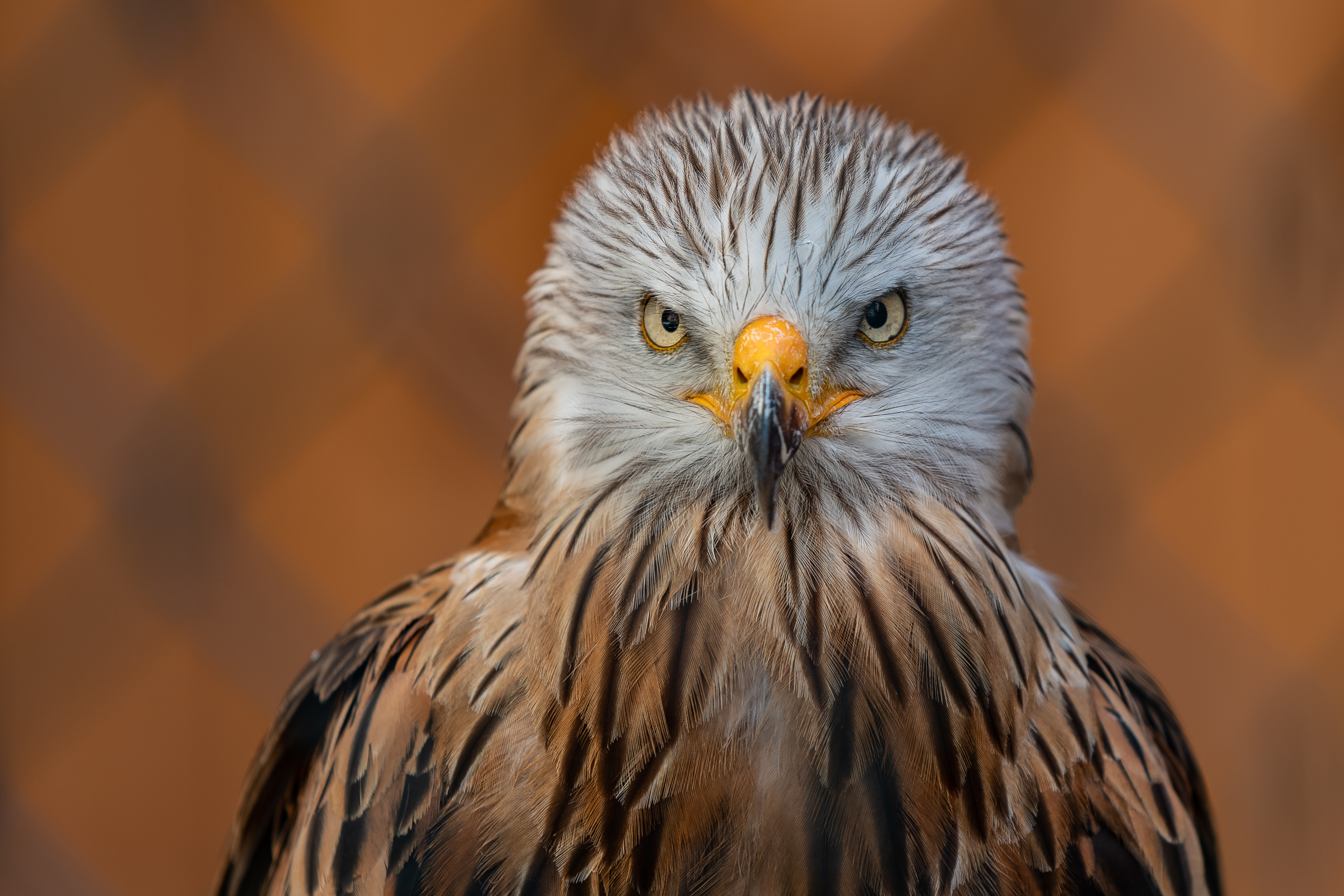
Red kite, falconry Adlerwarte Obernberg am Inn, Upper Austria

Red kites are 60 to 70 cm (24 to 28 in) long with a 175–195 cm (69–77 in) wingspan; males weigh 800–1,200 g (28–42 oz), and females 1,000–1,300 g (35–46 oz). The tail length of a female is 31.4-37.6cm (12-14 in) while the tail length of a male is 30.1-35.1cm (11-13 in). Newton (1979) suggests that female Red Kites tend to be larger than males due to the female’s greater amount of time spent at the nest, hence a greater role in defending it from potential predators. It is an elegant bird, soaring on long wings held at a dihedral, and long forked tail, twisting as it changes direction. The body, upper tail and wing coverts are rufous. The white primary flight feathers contrast with the black wing tips and dark secondaries. Apart from the weight difference, the sexes are similar, but juveniles have a buff breast and belly. Its call is a thin piping sound, similar to but less mewling than the common buzzard. There is a rare white leucistic form accounting for approximately 1% of hatchlings in the Welsh population, but this variation confers a disadvantage in the survival stakes.

=== Differences between adults and juveniles ===
Adults differ from juveniles in a number of characteristics:

- Adults are overall more deeply rufous, compared with the more washed out colour of juveniles;
- Adults have black breast-streaks whereas on juveniles these are pale;
- Juveniles have a less deeply forked tail, with a dark subterminal band;
- Juveniles have pale tips to all of the greater-coverts (secondary and primary) on both the upper- and under-wings, forming a long narrow pale line; adults have pale fringes to upperwing secondary-coverts only.

These differences hold throughout most of the first year of a bird's life.

== Behaviour ==
=== Breeding ===
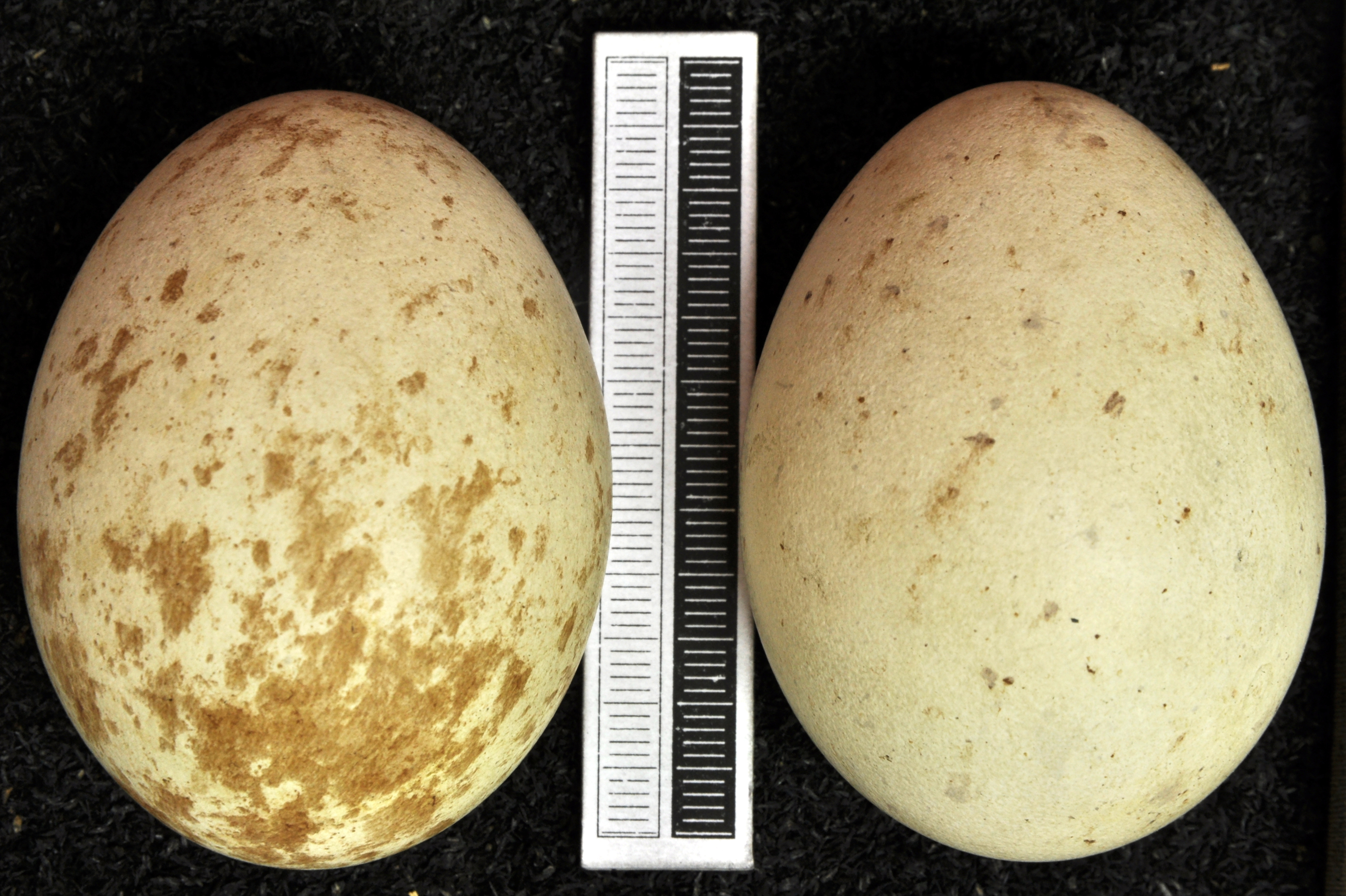
Eggs in the natural history collection of the Museum Wiesbaden, Germany

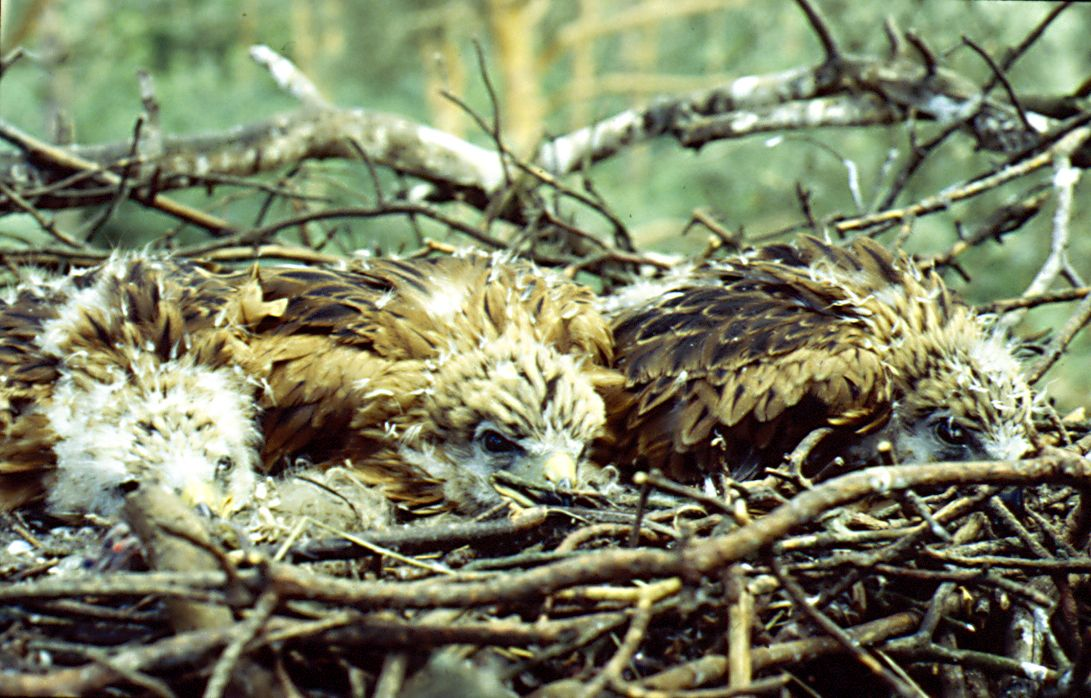
Juveniles at nest, Berlin

Usually, red kites first breed when they are two years old, although exceptionally, they can successfully breed when they are only one year old. They are monogamous and the pair-bond in resident populations is likely maintained during the winter, particularly when the pair remain on their breeding territory. For migrant populations, the fidelity to a particular nesting site means that the pair-bond is likely to be renewed each breeding season. The nest is normally placed in a fork within a large hardwood tree at a height of between 12 and 15 m (39 and 49 ft) above the ground. A pair will sometimes use a nest from the previous year and can occasionally occupy the old nests of the common buzzard. The nest is built by both sexes. The male brings dead twigs 30–50 cm (12–20 in) in length which are placed by the female. The nest is lined with grass and sometimes also with sheep's wool. Unlike the black kite, no greenery is added to the nest. Both sexes continue to add material to the nest during the incubation and nestling periods. Nests vary greatly in size and can become large when the same nest is occupied for several seasons.

The eggs are laid at three-day intervals. The clutch is usually between one and three eggs, but four and even five eggs have occasionally been recorded. The eggs are non-glossy with a white ground and red-brown spots. The average size is 57 mm × 45 mm (2.2 in × 1.8 in) with a calculated weight of 63 g (2.2 oz). In Britain and central Europe, laying begins at the end of March but in the Mediterranean area laying begins in early March. The eggs are mainly incubated by the female, but the male will relieve her for short periods while she feeds. The male will also bring food for the female. Incubation starts as soon as the first egg is laid. Each egg hatches after 31 to 32 days but as they hatch asynchronously a clutch of three eggs requires 38 days of incubation. The chicks are cared for by both parents. The female broods them for the first 14 days while the male brings food to the nest which the female feeds to the chicks. Later both parents bring items of food which are placed in the nest to allow the chicks to feed themselves. The nestlings begin climbing onto branches around their nest from 45 days but they rarely fledge before 48–50 days and sometimes not until they are 60–70 days of age. The young spend a further 15–20 days in the neighbourhood of the nest being fed by their parents. Only a single brood is raised each year but if the eggs are lost the female will relay.

The maximum age recorded is 25 years and 8 months for a ringed bird in Germany. The BTO longevity record for Britain and Ireland is also 25 years and 8 months for a bird found dead in Buckinghamshire in 2018. In 2023, one of the first red kites reintroduced to the UK was found injured in Oxfordshire and later died, aged 29.

=== Food and feeding ===
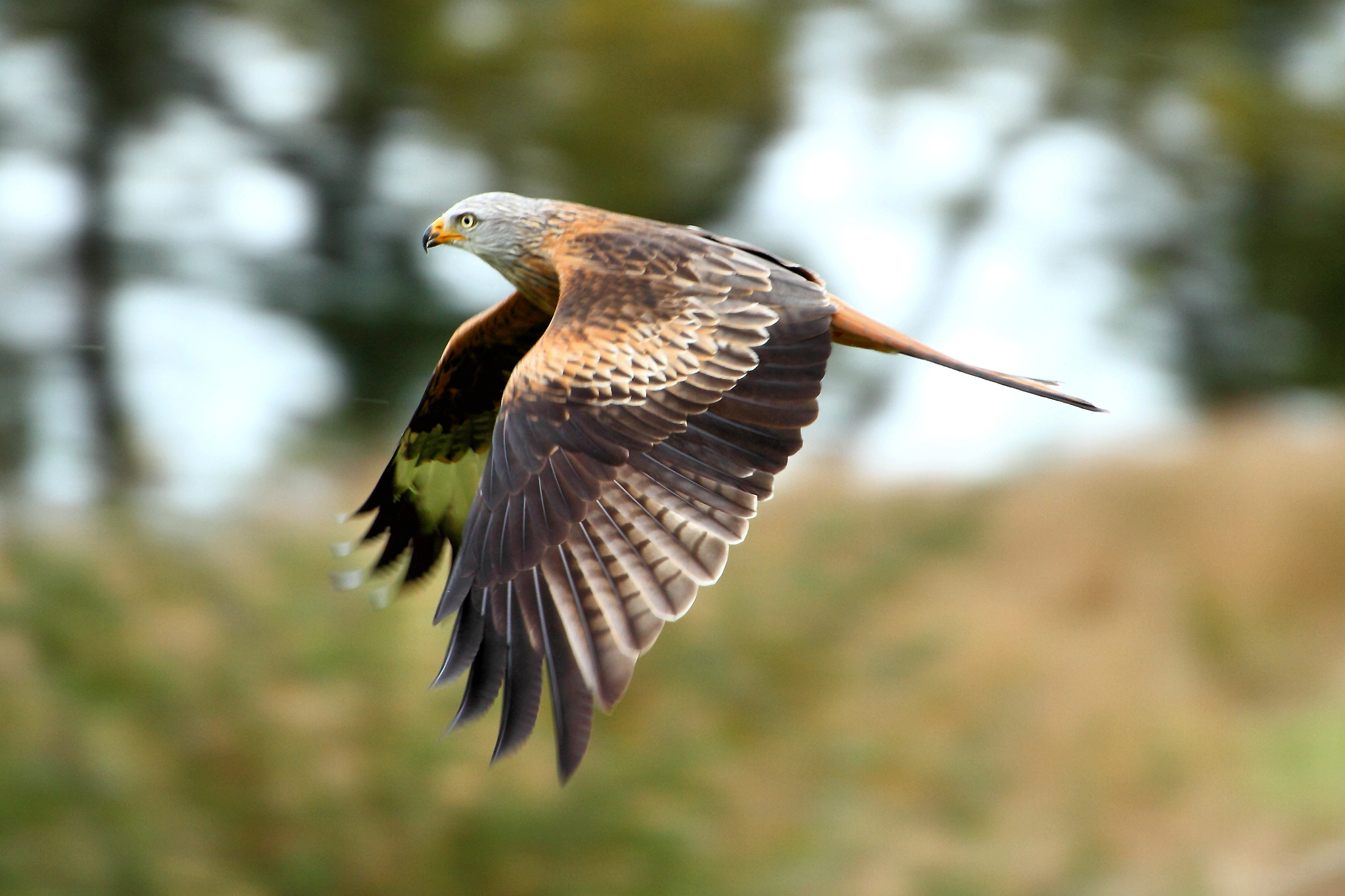
Side view of adult, Wales

The red kites are generalist scavengers and predators. Their diets consist mainly of carrion of large domestic animals such as sheep and pigs, roadkill, and stranded fish. They also take small mammals such as mice, voles, shrews, stoats, young hares and rabbits. Live birds are also taken, especially young or wounded, such as crows, doves, starlings, thrushes, larks, gulls, and waterfowl. Occasionally reptiles and amphibians are taken and invertebrates such as earthworms form an important part of the diet, especially in spring. In some parts of the United Kingdom, red kites are also deliberately fed in domestic gardens, explaining the presence of red kites in urban areas. Here, up to 5% of householders have provided supplementary food for red kites, with chicken being the predominant meat provided.

As scavengers, red kites are particularly susceptible to poisoning. Illegal poison baits set for foxes or crows are indiscriminate and kill protected birds and other animals. There have also been a number of incidents of red kites and other raptors being targeted by wildlife criminals.

On occasion, red kites may directly steal food from humans. One such occurrence took place in Marlow, Buckinghamshire (a town near a major reintroduction site for the species in the UK in the nearby village of Stokenchurch), in which red kites swooped down to steal sandwiches from people in one of the town's parks.

== Distribution and status ==
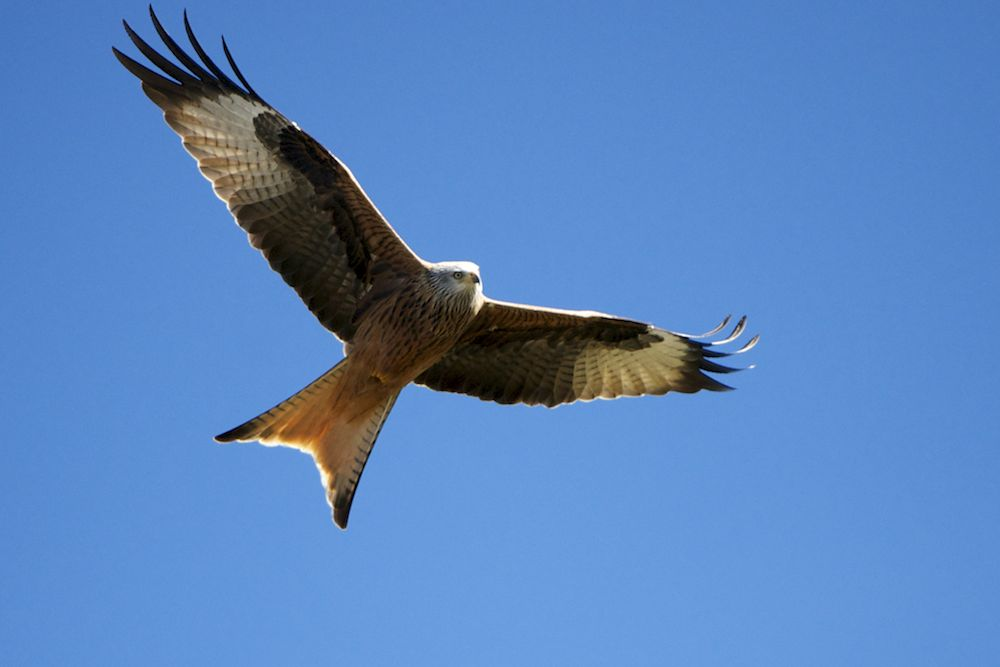
Red kite in flight in Gredos Mountains, Avila, Spain

Red kites inhabit broadleaf woodlands, pastures, mixed farmland, valleys and wetland edges, up to at least 1,600 metres (5,200 ft) elevation. They are native to the western Palearctic, with all of the currently known 32,200–37,700 breeding pairs being in Europe. There also used to be breeding populations in western Asia (northern Iran, Syria and Turkey) and northwestern Africa (Algeria, Morocco and Tunisia), but most of these were extirpated in the 19th century or earlier; the only non-European breeding population in recent decades was in Morocco where the last known pair was in 2004. Today it breeds from Portugal and Spain, through the central part of the continent east to European Russia, north to southern Scandinavia, Latvia and the United Kingdom, and south to southern Italy; few if any breeders remain in the Balkans. Most red kites that breed in the northern European mainland used to move south or west in winter, typically wintering in Spain and other parts of western Europe with a mild climate, as well as northwestern Africa (Algeria, Morocco and Tunisia) and Turkey. In recent decades, an increasing number of red kites from the northern European mainland have stayed in the region year-round.

The populations in Germany (which alone is home to almost half of the world's breeding pairs), France and Spain declined between 1990 and 2000, and overall the species declined by almost 20% over those ten years. Populations in Germany and France have subsequently stabilised, and because of growth in other countries, the overall population is now increasing. The main threats to red kites are poisoning, through illegal direct poisoning and indirect poisoning from pesticides, particularly in the wintering ranges in France and Spain, and changes in agricultural practices causing a reduction in food resources. Other threats include electrocution, hunting and trapping, deforestation, egg-collection (on a local scale) and possibly competition with the generally more successful black kite M. migrans.

=== Continental Europe ===
In Germany, intensive persecution brought the red kite close to extinction in the late 19th century, before its population began to recover in the 1920s. German populations declined by 25%–30% between 1991 and 1997, but have remained stable since. The populations of the northern foothills of the Harz Mountains (the most densely populated part of its range) suffered an estimated 50% decline from 1991 to 2001. In Spain, the species showed an overall decline in breeding population of up to 43% for the period 1994 to 2001–02, and surveys of wintering birds in 2003–04 suggest a similarly large decline in core wintering areas. The Balearic Islands population has declined from 41 to 47 breeding pairs in 1993 to just 10 in 2003. In France, breeding populations have decreased in the northeast, but seem to be stable in southwest and central France and Corsica. Populations elsewhere are stable or undergoing increases. In Sweden, the species has increased from 30 to 50 pairs in the 1970s to 1,200 breeding pairs in 2003 and has continued growing. In Switzerland, populations have been increasing since the 1990s. Red kites have declined in their traditional strongholds of Spain, France and Germany; while now stable in the last two countries, those populations remain well below their historical peaks. In contrast, red kite populations are increasing in parts of northern Europe, such as Denmark, Poland, Sweden and the United Kingdom. The red kite is the official landscape bird of the Swedish province of Scania, and depicted on the coat of arms of the municipality of Tomelilla.

=== United Kingdom ===
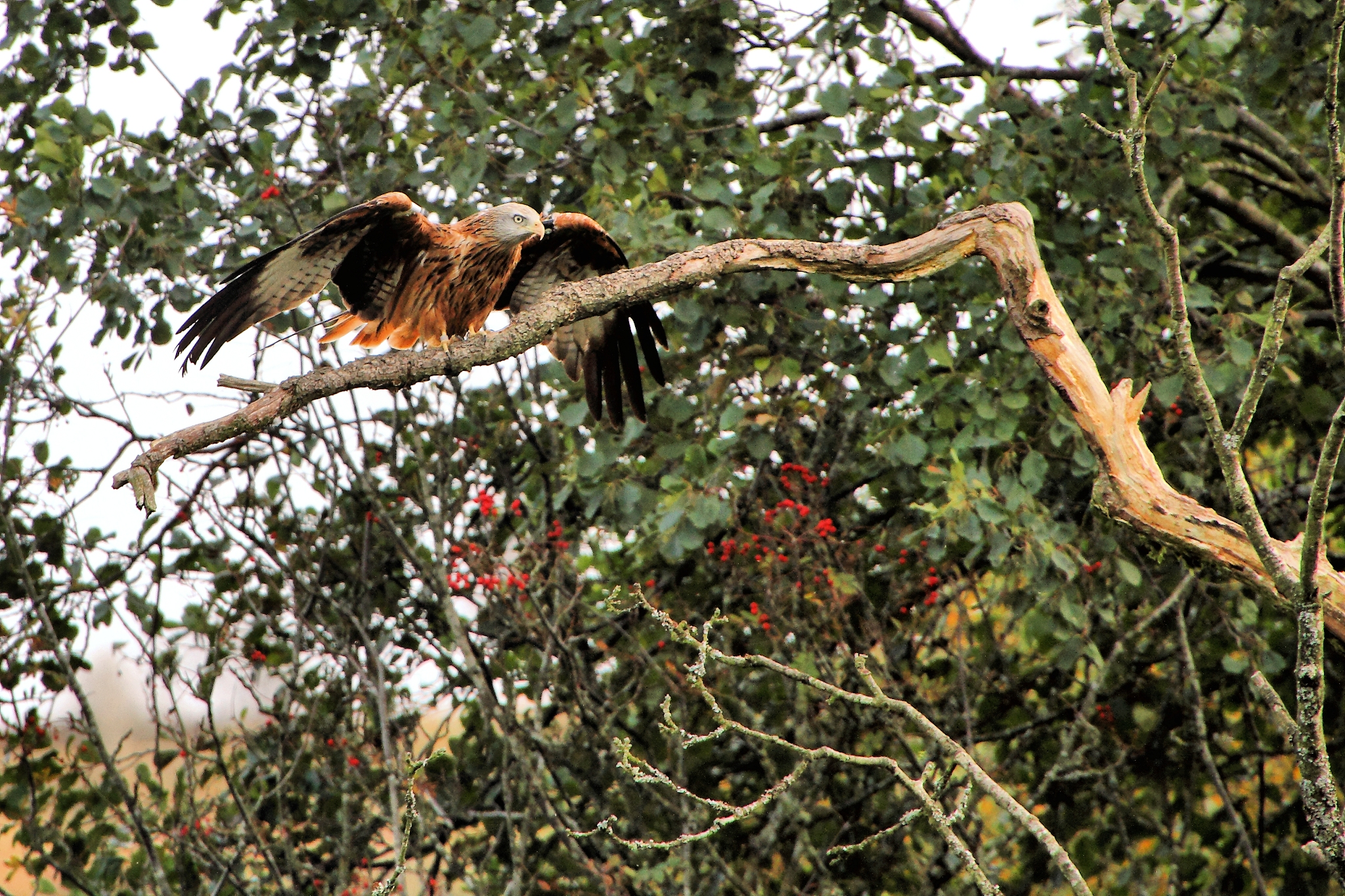
Red kite, Gigrin Farm, Wales

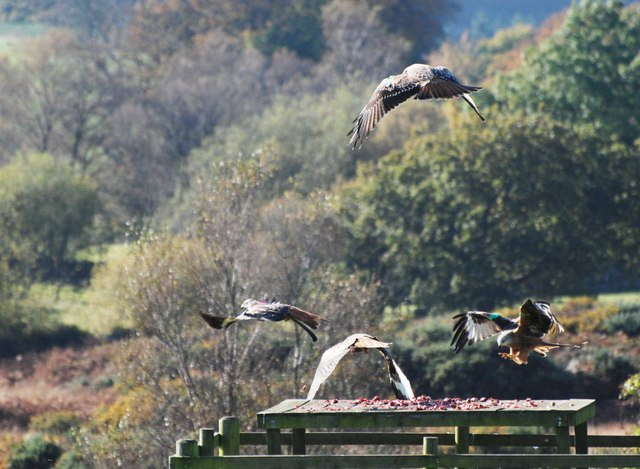
Red kites at the feeding station, Laurieston, Glasgow, Scotland.

A red kite soaring in Hampshire, UK

Red Kites were common in the United Kingdom in the 15th century, particularly in urban areas where they benefited by scavenging on animal waste thrown into the streets. For this role in removing waste, both Red Kites and Ravens became the first species to be granted special protection in England and Wales under royal statute for reasons other than hunting.

However, views varied within the United Kingdom. Shakespeare's King Lear describes his daughter Goneril as a detested kite, and he wrote "when the kite builds, look to your lesser linen" in reference to them stealing washing hung out to dry in the nesting season. In the mid-15th century, King James II of Scotland decreed that they should be "killed wherever possible", but they remained protected in England and Wales for the next 100 years as they kept the streets free of carrion and rotting food. Under Tudor "vermin laws" many creatures were seen as competitors for the produce of the countryside and bounties were paid by the parish for their carcasses.

By the 20th century, the breeding population was restricted to a handful of pairs in South Wales, but recently the Welsh population has been supplemented by re-introductions in England and Scotland. In 2004, from 375 occupied territories identified, at least 216 pairs were thought to have hatched eggs and 200 pairs reared at least 286 young. In 1989, six Swedish birds were released at a site in north Scotland and four Swedish and one Welsh bird in Buckinghamshire. Altogether, 93 birds of Swedish and Spanish origin were released at each of the sites. In the second stage of reintroduction in 1995 and 1996, further birds were brought from Germany to populate areas of Dumfries and Galloway. Between 2004 and 2006, 94 birds were brought from the Chilterns and introduced into the Derwent Valley in north East England. In Northern Ireland, 80 birds from wild stock in Wales were released between 2008 and 2010, and the first successful breeding was recorded in 2010. The reintroductions in the Chilterns Area of Outstanding Natural Beauty have been a success. Between 1989 and 1993, 90 birds were released there and by 2002, 139 pairs were breeding. They can commonly be seen taking advantage of thermals from the M40 motorway. Another successful reintroduction has been in Northamptonshire, which has become a stronghold for the red kite. Thirty Spanish birds were introduced into Rockingham Forest near Corby in 2000, and by 2010, the RSPB estimated that over 200 chicks had been reared from the initial release. So successful has the reintroduction been that 30 chicks have been transported from Rockingham Forest for release in Cumbria. By 2021 they had spread along the M4 as far as the Cotswold Edge overlooking the Severn near Bristol. From the Chilterns they have spread as far east as Essex and can be seen over Harlow, with sightings as far east as Colchester in 2025.

A sighting of the first red kite in London for 150 years was reported in The Independent newspaper in January 2006 and in June of that year, the UK-based Northern Kites Project reported that kites had bred in the Derwent Valley in and around Rowlands Gill, Tyne and Wear for the first time since the re-introduction.

In 1999, the red kite was named 'Bird of the Century' by the British Trust for Ornithology. According to the Welsh Kite Trust, it has been voted "Wales's favourite bird".

In June 2010, the Forestry Commission North West England announced a three-year project to release 90 red kites in Grizedale Forest, Cumbria under a special licence issued by Natural England. The Grizedale programme was the ninth reintroduction of red kites into different regions of the UK and the final re-introduction phase in England.

The stated aims of the Grizedale project were:

- To establish a viable population of red kites in Grizedale, South Cumbria by 2015.
- To increase the rate of red kite expansion into North West England and link up with existing populations in Wales, Yorkshire, North East England and South West Scotland and so increase the chances of a continuous geographical range.
- To develop community involvement and create educational opportunities arising from the project.

As of July 2011, non-breeding birds are regularly seen in all parts of Britain, and the number of breeding pairs is too large for the RSPB to continue to survey them on an annual basis.

In the 2020s, the UK kite population was deemed stable enough that, beginning in 2022, a small number of chicks have been taken to Spain to help recover populations there.

=== Ireland ===
Red kites were extinct in Ireland by the middle 19th century due to persecution, poisoning and woodland clearance. In May 2007, Minister for the Environment, Heritage and Local Government Dick Roche announced an agreement to bring at least 100 birds from Wales to restock the population as part of a five-year programme in the Wicklow Mountains, similar to the earlier golden eagle reintroduction programme. On 19 July 2007, the first 30 red kites were released in County Wicklow. On 22 May 2010, two newly hatched red kite chicks were discovered in the Wicklow Mountains, bringing the number of chicks hatched since reintroduction to seven. In 2026 the Irish government confirmed that the reintroduction of the red kite to County Wicklow was complete, as the species had become well established locally and was spreading to neighbouring areas.

=== Populations and trends by country ===
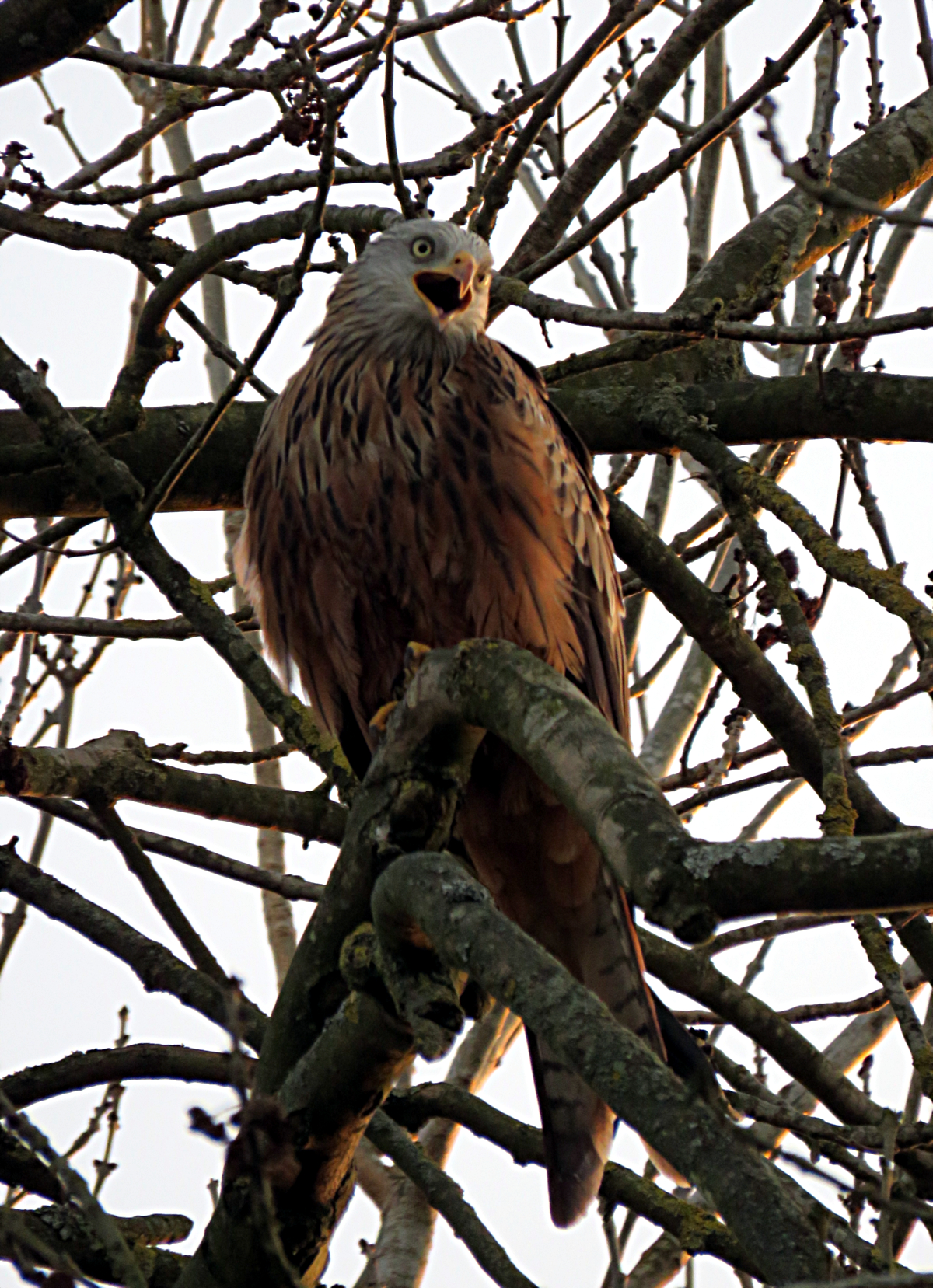
A young red kite in Cookham, Berkshire.

The following figures (mostly estimates) have been collated from various sources. They cover most of the countries in which red kites are believed to have bred.

Country	Year	Pairs	Trend	Notes
Albania		0	Unknown	Bred 1906
Algeria		0	Steady	Bred in the 19th century, now extinct
Austria	2019	90–130	▲	Extinct 1950, recolonised 1970s; 5–10 pairs in 2000 and since then rapidly increasing
Belarus	1997	1	Unknown	Extinct 1950s, recolonised 1985; 10 pairs 1990
Belgium	2020	350–400	▲	Declined to 1–2 known pairs in 1967, then recovery
Bosnia and Herzegovina		0	Unknown	
Bulgaria		0	Unknown	May breed but no proof
Canary Islands		0	Steady	Extinct 1970s
Cape Verde	2000	1?	▼	50–75 pairs late 1980s; effectively extinct
Croatia		0	Unknown	2–5 pairs 1980s
Czech Republic	2013	165–185	▲	Extinct late 19th century, recolonised 1975
Denmark	2021	300–350	▲	Extinct c. 1920, then recolonised (from Germany/Sweden) 1970s. Slow increase up until the early 2000s (17 known pairs in 2001), since then rapidly increasing
England	2011	c. 2,000	▲	Extinct 1870s, reintroduced 1989–1992, recovering
Estonia	1989	<1	Unknown	
France	2018	3,000–3,900	Steady	Rapidly declined from the 1980s until around 2010, since then stable or perhaps increasing locally
Germany	2018	14,000–16,000	Steady	15,000–25,000 pairs 1980s; declined up until around 2000, populations subsequently stabilised
Greece		0	Steady	
Hungary	c. 1998	1+	▼	30 pairs 1950s
Ireland	2010	7	▲	First successful breeding reported in 2010 following reintroduction in 2007
Italy	c. 2002	300–400	▲	70–150 pairs late 1980s. Clear increase in the mainland in recent decades, but almost extirpated in Sicily
Latvia	1992	0–50	▲	Extinct 1964, then recolonised
Lithuania	1988	1–2	▲	Extinct, then recolonised 1981
Luxembourg	2015	90	▲	
Moldova	1990	1	Unknown	
Montenegro	1995	0	Unknown	
Morocco	2020	0	Steady	Last breeding pair in 2004; rare winter visitor
Netherlands	2018	15–20	▲	Extinct 1852, recolonised 1970s, but highly irregular until 2008, since then regular and increasing
Northern Ireland	2010	5	▲	First successful breeding reported in 2010 following reintroduction in 2008
North Macedonia		0	Unknown	
Norway	1980	0	Steady	Bred occasionally in the 19th century
Poland	2012	1,500–1,800	▲	400–450 pairs 1980s
Portugal	c. 1995	100–200	▼	Appears to have rapidly decreased in recent decades, but accurate data lacking
Romania	1995	15–20	Unknown	
Russia	1992	0–50	Unknown	
Scotland	2009	135	▲	Extinct 1886, reintroduced 1989–1992
Serbia			Unknown	
Slovakia	1992	10–20	Unknown	
Spain	2018	2,312–2,440	▼	10,000 pairs 1977
Sweden	2021	4,000–5,000	▲	Increase from the low-point of 30–50 pairs in the 1970s
Switzerland	2013–2016	2,800–3,500	▲	Declined 19th century, later recovery; 235–300 pairs in the late 1980s, 800–1,000 pairs in 1995.
Tunisia		0	Steady	Bred in the 19th century, now extinct
Turkey		0	Unknown	May have bred in past but no firm evidence
Ukraine	1990	5–8	▼	
Wales	2009	c. 1,000	▲	Declined to two pairs in the 1930s, then recovery

== Observation ==
One of the best places to see the red kite in Scandinavia is Scania in southern Sweden. It may be observed in one of its breeding locations such as the Kullaberg Nature Preserve near Mölle. In Switzerland, they are a common sight in all rural areas, excluding the Alps and its foothills.

Some of the best places to see them in the United Kingdom are Gigrin Farm near Rhayader, mid Wales, where hundreds are fed by the local farmer as a tourist attraction, a Red Kite Feeding Station at Llanddeusant in the Brecon Beacons, visited daily by over 50 birds, and the Bwlch Nant yr Arian forest visitor centre in Ceredigion where the rare leucistic variant can be seen. In England, the Oxfordshire part of the Chilterns has many red kites, especially near Henley-on-Thames and Watlington, where they were introduced on John Paul Getty's estate. Red Kites are also becoming common across the border in Buckinghamshire, often being seen near Stokenchurch, where a population was released in the 1990s, and Flackwell Heath near High Wycombe. They can also be seen around Harewood near Leeds where they were re-introduced in 1999. In Ireland they can be best observed at Redcross, near Avoca, County Wicklow.

== See also ==
- Beheading the Kite
- Shite-hawk

== Sources ==
- Cramp, Stanley; et al., eds. (1980). "Milvus milvus Red Kite". Handbook of the Birds of Europe the Middle East and North Africa: The Birds of the Western Palearctic. Vol. II: Hawks to Bustards. Oxford: Oxford University Press. pp. 36–44. ISBN 978-0-19-857505-4.
