= Marta Rzewuska-Frankowska =

Polish anthropoligist, educator (1889–1954)

- Born: Marta Zofia Rzewuska; 12 March 1889; Siedlce, Poland
- Died: 24 May 1954 (aged 65); Warsaw
- Burial place: Powązki Cemetery
- Education: University of Lviv
- Occupations: Anthropologist, educator
- Known for: Educational work
- Spouse: Eugeniusz Frankowski

Marta Zofia Rzewuska-Frankowska, pseudonym Izia, (born 12 March 1889 in Siedlce, died 24 May 1954) – anthropologist and teacher. She was also known as Marta Frankowska and taught secret classes in war-torn Poland in 1939.

== Biography; ==
She was born Marta Zofia Rzewuska, the daughter of Aleksander Rzewuski and Józefa née Męczkowska. She graduated from Jan Miłkowski's Higher Pedagogical Courses for Women in Warsaw and took up work as a teacher at the Railway School in Żbikowo near Warsaw. At the same time, she began running workers' circles and working as a courier transporting socialist papers from Kraków to Warsaw. For her political activity, she was expelled from school in 1905 and In 1906 she joined the Union of Socialist Youth, and in 1910 the Polish Socialist Party. In 1913 she left for Zurich, where she began her studies in anthropology, but she had to interrupt them due to financial difficulties. She spent World War I working on the board of the Polish Self-Help Committee in Switzerland.

After the War, she completed her anthropological studies at the University of Lviv, married Eugeniusz Frankowski, and in 1924 she obtained a doctorate in philosophy for her thesis, Skulls from the Lviv Latin Cathedral of the 17th and 18th centuries. She contributed to the establishment of the Polish Anthropological Society. Throughout the interwar period, as well as after World War II, she worked as an educator in various primary and secondary schools in Warsaw (including Queen Jadwiga's X High School, where she was the principal of a state secondary school in 1933–1939, and after the war in 1947–1948 the principal of a high school).

According to school history, Frankowska set up secret classes in 1939 so students could continue their education.

"Despite the [school] building being damaged during air raids, classes resumed on 2nd October. After all comprehensive schools were closed in November, Principal Marta Frankowska was one of the first to start organising secret classes on 1st December 1939. Initially, 15 groups of several students were set up, later there were 129. Despite the inconveniences, maintaining a high standard of education was considered a point of honour. During the entire period of classes, during the occupation, 250 final exams were issued, of which about 200 were verified thanks to the surviving exam protocols."

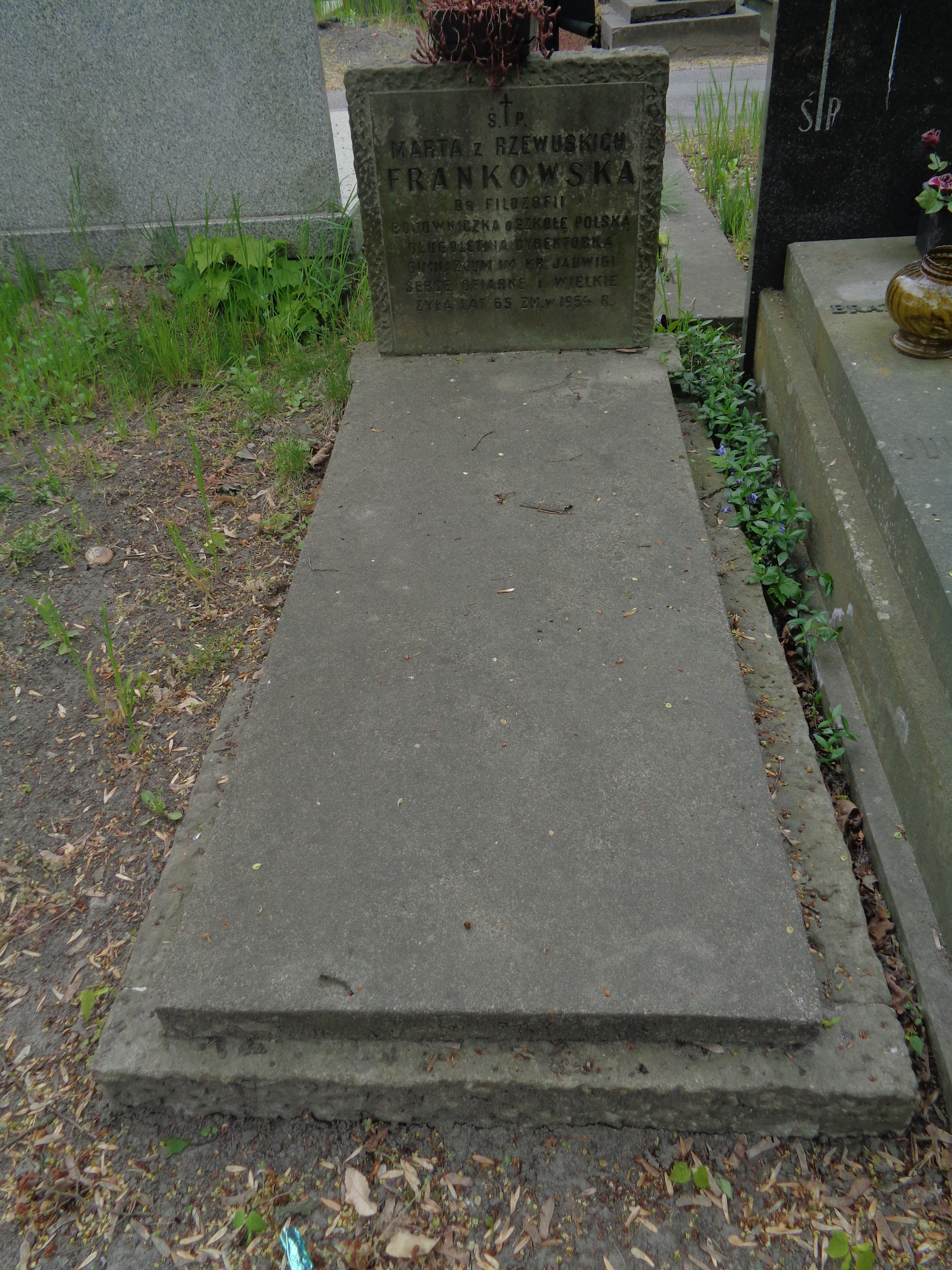
Grave of Marta Rzewuska-Frankowska in Warsaw

She also taught in Poznań, where, from 1928, she conducted classes in pedagogy in scientific journals: "Przegląd Antropologiczny" and "Czasopismo Przyrodniczy". She was involved in popularizing knowledge of nature, among others, in Wszechnica Radiowa.

She had one child, Ineza, and died in Warsaw on 24 May 1954. She was buried at the Powązki Cemetery in Warsaw (section 116-2-11).

== Decorations ==
Gold Cross of Merit (10 March 1939)
