= Łączyńska Huta =

Łączyńska Huta Łątczińskô Hëta
- Village
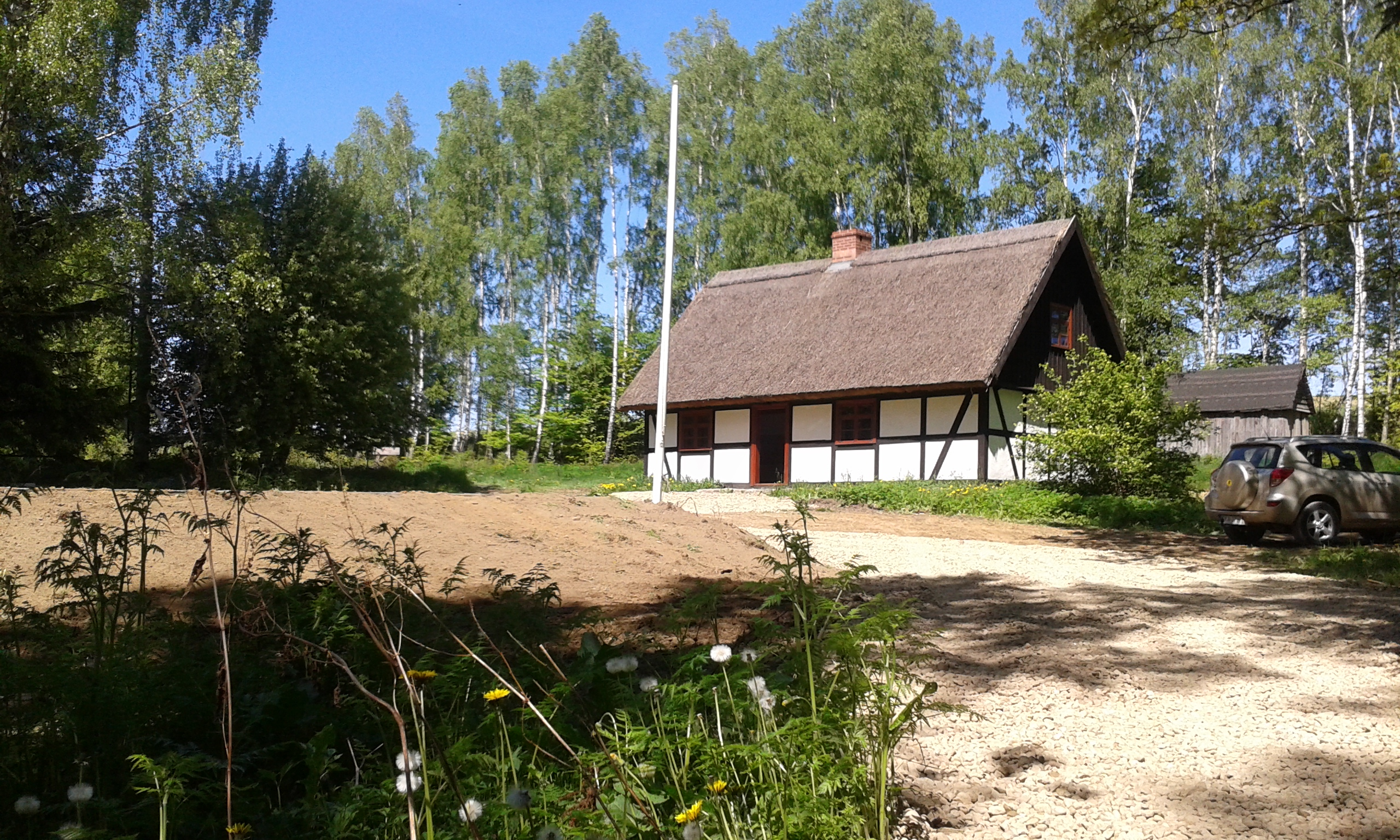

- Location within Poland
- Coordinates: 54°17′36″N 18°1′19″E
- Country: Poland
- Voivodeship: Pomeranian
- County: Kartuzy
- Gmina: Chmielno

Łączyńska Huta [wɔnˈt͡ʂɨɲska ˈxuta] (Kashubian: Łątczińskô Hëta) is a village in the administrative district of Gmina Chmielno, within Kartuzy County, Pomeranian Voivodeship, in northern Poland.

For details of the history of the region, see History of Pomerania.
