= Eugeniusz Frankowski =

Polish ethnographer

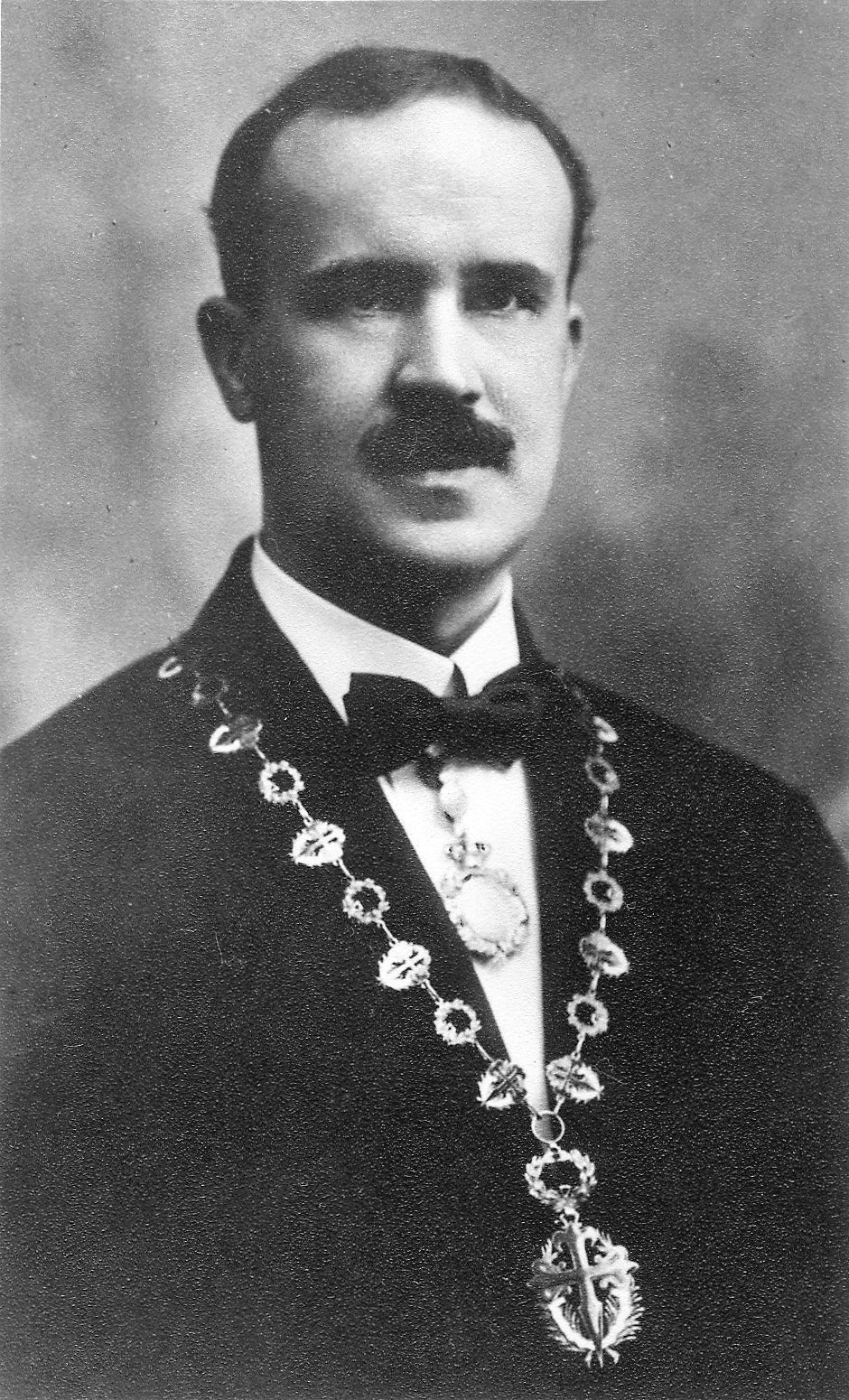
- Portrait of Frankowski in Madrid, Kingdom of Spain, 1920. From the collections of the National Museum of Ethnography
- Born: November 21, 1884; Siedlce, Siedlce Governorate, Vistula Land
- Died: February 8, 1962 (aged 77); Poznań, Poznań Voivodeship, Polish People's Republic
- Spouse: Marta Rzewuska-Frankowska
- Parent(s): Władysław and Ludwika née Kozłowska

Eugeniusz Frankowski (1884–1962) was a Polish archaeologist, ethnographer and ethnologist. He was married to the anthropologist and educator Marta Rzewuska-Frankowska.
