= List of disasters in Poland by death toll =

Listed below are the worst disasters in Poland's history, listed by death toll. This list excludes warfare, the Holocaust and intentional acts of destruction, but may include accidents in which the military, Polish or foreign, was involved (e.g. Osiecznica bus disaster - a collision between a Polish bus and a Soviet Army truck).

Some of the disasters listed here occurred outside of current Polish borders (e.g. the Smolensk Tu-154 crash) or in times when Poland was not internationally recognized (e.g. during the partitions of Poland), but the predominant number of victims were either Poles or Polish citizens.

== Over 100 confirmed deaths ==
Disaster	Type	Location	Deaths	Date	Ref.
LOT Polish Airlines Flight 5055	Aviation accident	Warsaw	183	9 May 1987	
Kleofas coal mine disaster	Mining accident	Katowice	104	3–4 March 1896	
Barbara-Wyzwolenie coal mine disaster	Mining accident	Chorzów	103	21 March 1954	

== 40 to 99 confirmed deaths ==
Disaster	Type	Location	Deaths	Date	Ref.
Smolensk Tu-154 crash	Aviation accident	Smolensk	96	10 April 2010	
LOT Polish Airlines Flight 007	Aviation accident	Warsaw	87	14 March 1980	
Makoszowy coal mine disaster	Mining accident	Zabrze	72	28 August 1958	
Otłoczyn railway accident	Train wreck	Otłoczyn	67	19 August 1980	
Katowice Trade Hall roof collapse	Building collapse	Chorzów	65	28 January 2006	
1928 derecho in Poland	Derecho		62	4 July 1928	
Wielopole Skrzyńskie cinema fire	Structure fire	Wielopole Skrzyńskie	58	11 May 1955	
1997 Central European flood	Flood	Western Poland	56	July 1997	
1934 flood in Poland	Flood	South of Poland	55	14-20 July 1934	
1980 Górna Grupa psychiatric hospital fire	Structure fire	Górna Grupa	55	31 October 1980	
Sinking of the MS Jan Heweliusz	Shipwrecking	Baltic Sea (near Rügen)	55	14 January 1993	
LOT Polish Airlines Flight 165	Aviation accident	Polica (near Zawoja)	53	2 April 1969	
Rotunda PKO Bank explosion	Gas explosion	Warsaw	49	15 February 1979	

== 20 to 39 confirmed deaths ==
Disaster	Type	Location	Deaths	Date	Ref.
1978 Balkan Bulgarian Tupolev Tu-134 crash	Aviation accident	Gabare (near Byala Slatina, Bulgaria)	39 Poles (out of 73 total fatalities)	16 March 1978	
Czechowice-Dziedzice refinery fire	Structure fire	Czechowice-Dziedzice	37	26 June 1971	
1962 LOT Vickers Viscount Warsaw crash	Aviation accident	Warsaw	33	19 December 1962	
PKS Gdańsk bus crash	Traffic collision	Gdańsk	32	2 May 1994	
Wilczy Jar buses tragedy	Traffic collision	Żywiec	30	15 November 1978	
Warsaw Holy Cross Church Stampede	Stampede	Warsaw	30	25 December 1881	
Grenoble coach crash	Traffic collision	Vizille, France	26	22 July 2007	
Julianka rail crash	Train wreck	Julianka	25	3 November 1976	
Osieck rail crash	Train wreck	Osieck	25	4 June 1981	
Sinking of the MS Busko Zdrój	Sinking	North Sea	24	8 February 1985	
Kamień Pomorski homeless hostel fire	Structure fire	Kamień Pomorski	23	13 April 2009	
2006 Halemba coal mine disaster	Mining accident	Ruda Śląska	23	22 November 2006	
MS Maria Konopnicka fire	Boat fire	Gdańsk Shipyard	22	13 December 1961	
1995 Gdańsk gas explosion	Gas explosion	Gdańsk	23	17 April 1995	
Mirosławiec air accident	Aviation accident	Mirosławiec	20	23 January 2008	
MS Kudowa Zdrój		Mediterranean Sea	20	20 January 1983	
Wujek-Śląsk coal mine disaster	Mining accident	Ruda Śląska	20	18 September 2009	

== 15 to 19 confirmed deaths ==
Disaster	Type	Location	Deaths	Date	Ref.
Balaton coach crash	Traffic collision	Near Lake Balaton in Hungary	19	1 July 2002	
Halemba coal mine disaster	Mining accident	Ruda Śląska	19	10 January 1990	
1968 Biały Jar avalanche	Avalanche	Sněžka (near Karpacz)	19	20 March 1968	
Nowe Miasto nad Pilica bus crash	Traffic collision	Nowe Miasto nad Pilica	18	12 October 2010	
Mysłowice coal mine disaster	Mining accident	Mysłowice	18	4 February 1987	
B406/6 trawler explosion		Gdańsk Shipyard	18	18 June 1980	
Motława ferry disaster	Shipwreck	Gdańsk	18	1 August 1975	
M/v Nysa		North Sea	18	10 January 1965	
Polish Air Force An-24 crash	Aviation accidents	Szczecin	18	28 February 1973	
1976 Gdańsk gas explosion	Gas explosion	Gdańsk	17	1 February 1976	
Szczekociny rail crash	Train wreck	Szczekociny	16	3 March 2012	
Ursus rail crash	Train wreck	Ursus	16	20 August 1990	
Radkowice rail crash	Train wreck	Radkowice	14	27 August 1973	
Osiecznica bus crash	Traffic collision	Osiecznica	15	22 January 1978	
Wyszaka streetcar crash	Tram derailment	Szczecin	15	7 December 1967	

== 10 to 14 confirmed deaths ==
Disaster	Type	Location	Deaths	Date	Ref.
Brandenburg coach crash		Schönefeld	14	26 September 2010	
Kaskada catering plant fire	Structure fire	Szczecin	14	27 April 1987	
MS Czubatka		North Sea	14	10 May 1955	
Krosno Odrzańskie tornado	Tornado	Krosno Odrzańskie	13	13 May 1886	
Izbicko level crossing accident		Izbicko	13	6 January 1960	
Mezőkeresztes bus crash		near Mezőkeresztes, Hungary	12	16 August 2026	
2022 Croatian bus crash	Traffic collision	A4 highway near Breznički Hum, Croatia	12	6 August 2022	
Storm in Mazury		Masuria	12	21 August 2007	
Jeżewo coach crash		Sikory-Wojciechowięta	12	30 September 2005	
Reptowo rail crash		Reptowo	12	5 May 1997	
Bydgoszcz rail crash		Śliesin (near Bydgoszcz)	12	3 June 1972	
MS Cyranka		North Sea	12	4 October 1956	
ČSM-north coal mine disaster		Stonava (near Karviná), Czechia	12	20 December 2018	
Psie Pole rail crash		Mirków	11 (unofficial death toll is 32)	9 July 1977	
Jas-Mos coal mine disaster	Mining accident		10	10 February 2002	
Ministry of Interior and Administration helicopter crash		Near Cisna	10	10 January 1991	
Drogomil level crossing accident		Drogomil	10	4 June 1988	
Piła rail crash		Piła	10	19 May 1988	
MS Brda		Hanstholm, Denmark	10	10 January 1975	
Rokitnica coal mine disaster		Zabrze	10	23 March 1971	
Agricultural University building collapse		Wrocław	10	22 March 1966	

== Fewer than 10 confirmed deaths ==
Disaster	Type	Location	Deaths	Date	Ref.
Bratoszewice level crossing collision		Bratoszewice	9	30 July 2012	
1983 Łódź gas explosion	Gas explosion	Łódź	8	7 December 1983	
1963 smallpox epidemic in Wrocław	Epidemic	Wrocław	7	17 July – 19 September 1963	
2017 Świebodzice tenement collapse	Building collapse	Świebodzice	6	8 April 2017	
Koszalin escape room fire	Structure fire	Koszalin	5	4 January 2019	
2008 Poland tornado outbreak	Tornado	Opole Voivodeship, Silesian Voivodeship and Łódź Voivodeship.	4	15–16 August 2008	
2022 missile explosion in Poland	Explosion	Przewodów	2	15 November 2022	

== See also ==
- List of disasters in Antarctica by death toll
- List of disasters in Australia by death toll
- List of disasters in Canada by death toll
- List of disasters in Croatia by death toll
- List of disasters in Germany by death toll
- List of disasters in Great Britain and Ireland by death toll
- List of disasters in New Zealand by death toll
- List of disasters in Ukraine by death toll
- List of disasters in the United States by death toll
