= Kamień Pomorski homeless hostel fire =

2009 fire in Kamień Pomorski, Poland

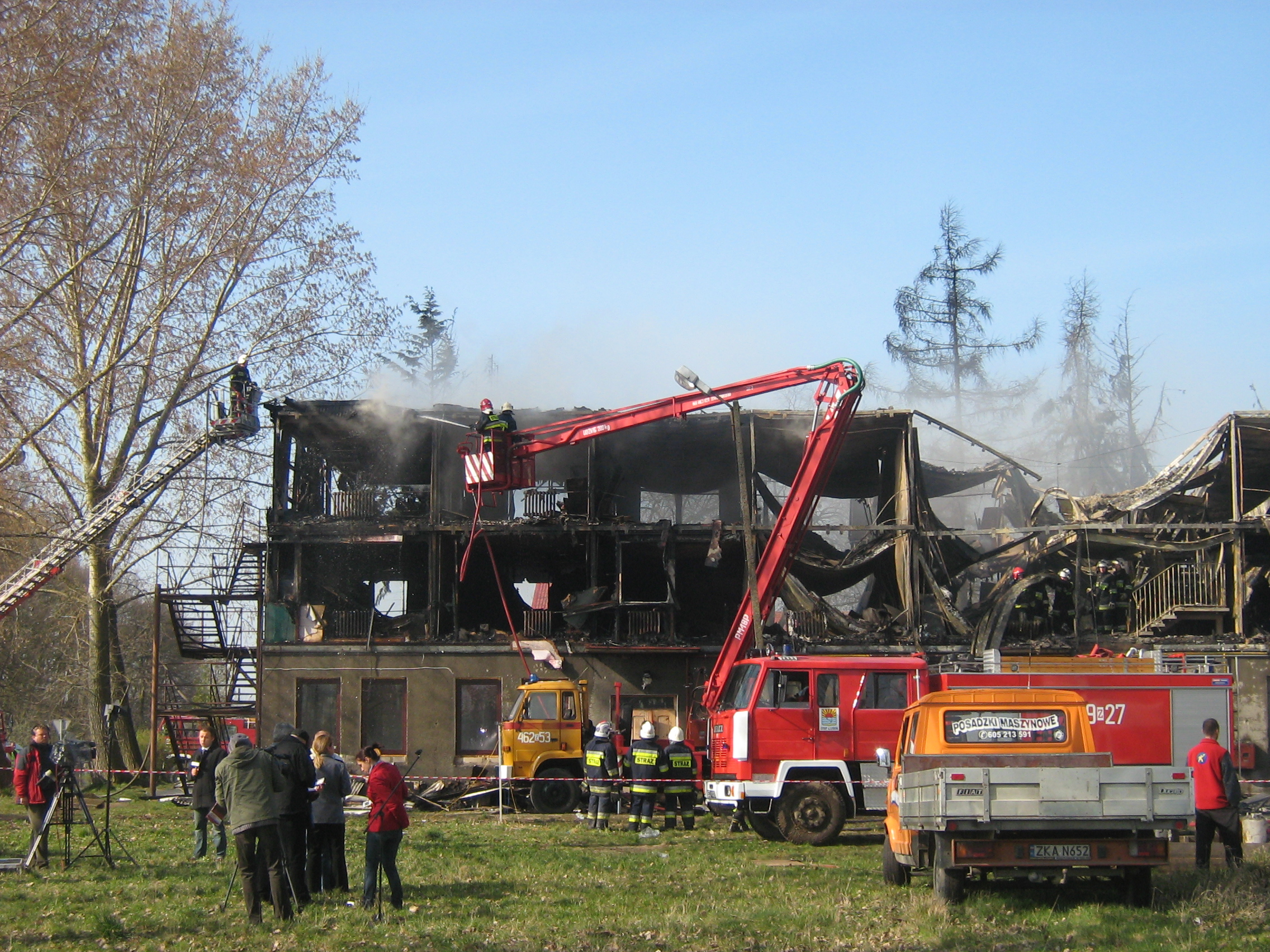
- Charred remains of the homeless shelter in Kamień Pomorski, Poland
- Date: 13 April 2009
- Venue: Homeless hostel
- Location: Kamień Pomorski, Poland; 53°57′36″N 14°46′39″E
- Type: Fire
- Deaths: 23
- Injuries: 20

The Kamień Pomorski homeless hostel fire occurred in north-western Poland on 13 April 2009. The fire occurred during the night at a three-story homeless hostel in Kamień Pomorski (West Pomeranian Voivodeship). Twenty-three people, including 13 children, were pronounced dead, with a further 20 sustaining an injury of some sort. It was Poland's deadliest fire since a conflagration destroyed a home for the mentally ill in Górna Grupa in 1980 claiming the lives of 55 victims.

== Hostel ==
The hostel, originally a workers' hotel, was previously described as an unsafe building. It was a three-story structure originally built as one-story in the early 1970s; two stories made of highly flammable materials were added later. The walls were filled with flammable materials – polystyrene or polyurethane foam and non-flammable asbestos.

Seventy-seven people were registered at the hostel at the time of the fire. They were Nafta Polska employees and people placed there by social services.

Survivors have reported that this was not the first fire to occur at the hostel. The address was also known to the police, as many people were housed in the hostel by the social services. The building also housed Nafta Polska employees. At least seventy-seven people were sheltered in the building while waiting to be provided with alternative housing, but the number of people actually staying in the hotel during the night of the fire was unclear.

== Fire ==
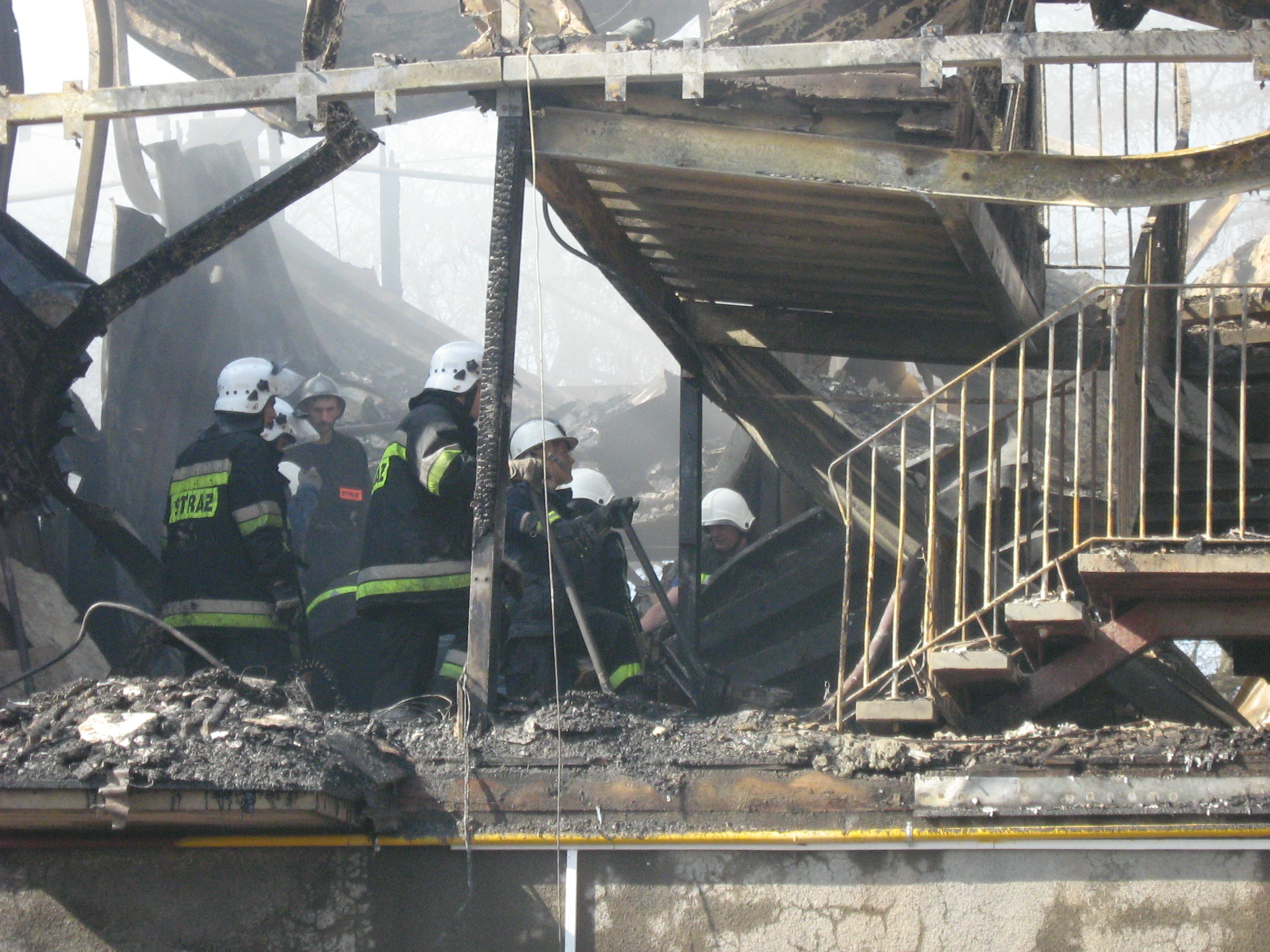
Polish firefighters searching for victims

The fire is believed to have started around midnight on 13 April (23:00 UTC), but the first report was received by the Fire Department as late as 00:32 Polish Time (23:32 UTC) followed by reports to the police and paramedics. The firefighters arrived at 00:36 and helped to evacuate people, but despite a quick response arrived to find four-fifths of the hostel already in flames with hallways blocked by thick black smoke. By 00:43 the fire escalated and the firefighters were unable to continue the evacuation. Forty-one people escaped and 20 were located in hospitals.

Many of the survivors jumped out of the building, because the available rescue ladders could only reach the first floor. Children were taken from their beds by their parents and hurled through windows as firefighters and onlookers grabbed them and brought them to safety. Common injuries as a result of the fire included burns, smoke inhalation, and fractured bones. Many of the corpses were charred beyond recognition, which caused the death toll to be underestimated at first. Some of the casualties were visiting the building and were not necessarily permanently housed there.

The hostel was completely destroyed in a fire that the BBC called "one of the deadliest in living memory". Images broadcast on television showed "huge flames reaching high into the sky above the roof" and the "charred, gutted shell" of the hostel. Several hours were spent extinguishing the fire, with twenty-one fire crews on hand to assist.

The death toll was first announced as 21, but two persons were still missing – due to the way the building was evacuated and witness testimonies saying they were seen leaving during the fire it was unclear whether they had escaped. By the end of April twenty bodies and four pieces of bodies were found at the scene, and after DNA tests it was discovered that the pieces were the remains of the missing persons, revising the death toll to 23, including 13 children aged from 2 to 16.

== Reactions ==
Three days of national mourning were declared in Poland to begin at midnight following the fire. The country's Prime Minister, Donald Tusk, who was on an Easter holiday like many of the victims, flew to Kamień Pomorski, promising new housing and aid for the survivors. The country's President, Lech Kaczyński, also made an appearance.

The President of Azerbaijan Ilham Aliyev, European Commission chairman José Manuel Barroso, Ukrainian president Viktor Yushchenko, French Prime Minister Nicolas Sarkozy and Minister of Foreign Affairs Bernard Kouchner sent condolences.

== Notes ==
Some reports mentioned that an eight-month-old infant perished, but it was later reported that it was in stable condition at the hospital.

== See also ==
- List of Poland disasters by death toll
