= Otłoczyn train collision =

1980 train crash near Otłoczyn, Kuyavian-Pomeranian Voivodeship, Poland

Coordinates: 52°56′34.5″N 18°41′43.8″E

Otłoczyn train crash
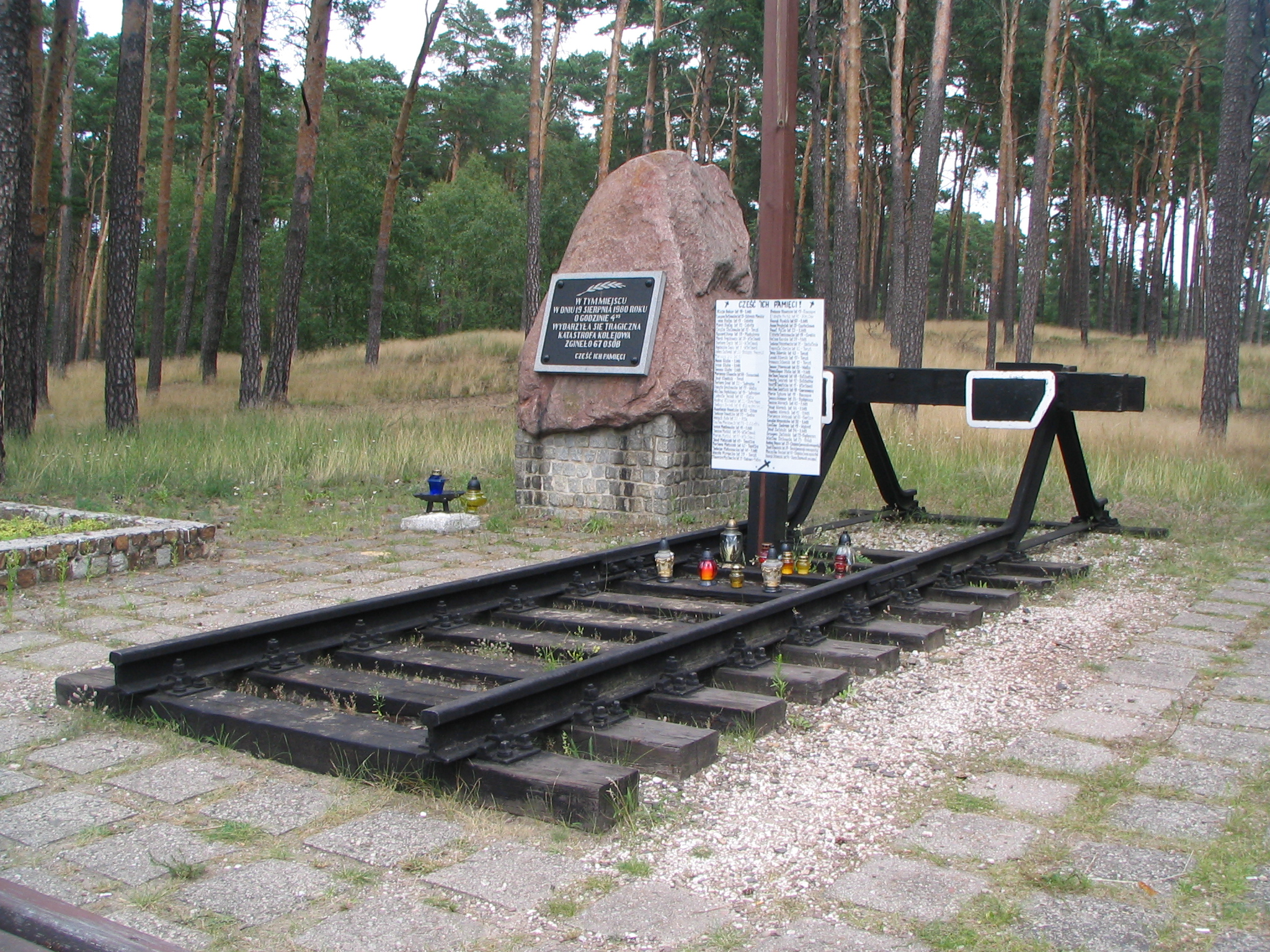
- Monument remembering the victims of the collision

Details
- Date: 19 August 1980; 4:30 a.m.
- Location: Near Otłoczyn
- Country: Poland
- Line: Kutno - Piła Główna, section Otłoczyn - Brzoza Toruńska
- Operator: Polish State Railways
- Incident type: Head-on collision
- Cause: Freight train driver error, caused by exhaustion from overwork

Statistics
- Trains: Os 5130 Toruń Główny - Łódź Kaliska; Freight train 11599 Otłoczyn - Wrocki
- Deaths: 67
- Injured: 64

The Otłoczyn train collision was a train crash which occurred on 19 August 1980, near the village of Otłoczyn (Kuyavian-Pomeranian Voivodeship, northern Poland). At 4:30 a.m., a freight train collided with a passenger train which ran from Toruń Main Station to Łódź Kaliska. As a result, 65 people were killed, and 64 injured, out of which an additional two later died, bringing the total number of dead to 67. It was caused by one of the drivers proceeding without permission in a thick fog. To date, it is the deadliest railway accident in peacetime history of Poland.

== Background ==
=== The freight train ===
In the early morning of 19 August 1980, 43-year-old train engineer Mieczysław Roschek from Chojnice was told to drive freight train number 11599 from the station of Otloczyn to nearby Wrocki. Roschek, who was later found guilty of the crash, had been working for 25 hours, which was against rail regulations, but was common at the time. According to the management of the Toruń Main station, the driver was lying about his worktime, stating that he had started his shift on 18 August at 8 PM in Bydgoszcz. One of his probable motivations was to get extra paid time, but as of 2020 this is stated to be false.

During the night of 18–19 August, Roschek, together with another engineer, Andrzej Bogusz, arrived at the Otloczyn station, driving engine number ST44-607, which was assigned to Chojnice depot. At around 2 a.m., the engine was coupled to freight train 11599 from Otłoczyn to Wrocki, which consisted of a few empty coal freight cars. The train then waited for two hours on a side track in the pine forest between Toruń and Włocławek before departing. Roschek's train was not included in any schedule. Like other trains of this kind, it was supposed to wait for the signal to proceed, which was only given when the track was clear.

=== The passenger train ===
On the same night, a local train number 5130 from Toruń Main Station to Łódź Kaliska driving with SP45-160 which Toruń depot, was scheduled to leave at 3:37 a.m. Driven by engineer Gerard Przyjemski, it consisted of engine SP45-160 and five passenger cars, and it departed several minutes late, waiting for a stopping train from the seaside resort of Kolobrzeg. The Kolobrzeg train had two cars full of children, going back from summer vacation. These cars were connected to the train to Łódź Kaliska as the last ones. The 5130 left Toruń Main at 4:19 a.m., almost one hour behind schedule. It quickly gained speed, reaching 88 kilometers per hour.

== The accident ==
Even though the signal did not permit the departure, the freight train driven by Roschek left Otloczyn at approximately 4:20, heading towards Toruń. Later investigation did not explain why the engineer decided to proceed without permission to do so. Roschek's train was on the wrong track, the same track on which the passenger train to Łódź Kaliska was speeding. It has been established that at Toruń rail center, nobody was expecting the 11599 to be moving. During the following minutes, rail service personnel at both Otłoczyn and Brzoza Toruńska found out about the freight train going wrong way, but it was already too late. Both trains were pulled by Diesel engines, neither of which was equipped with radiotelephones.

The engineers of both trains noticed each other at Brzoza Toruńska. Morning fog limited visibility, and the trains were some 150 meters from each other when they became visible. Roschek probably reacted first, engaging his brakes. He must have realized then that he was on the wrong track, but did not try to escape by jumping out. His body was later found in the engine. Przyjemski engaged his train's brakes a few seconds later, and immediately tried to escape the locomotive cab. The trains crashed into each other when he was in a narrow corridor in the rear of the engine; this probably saved his life. Later on, the investigators thoroughly recreated the accident, stating that it would have been impossible to stop the trains before the crash. The engines collided at 4:30 a.m. The freight train was traveling at 33 km/h, the passenger train 85 km/h.

== The victims ==
Among the first journalists who appeared at the scene was Zbigniew Juchniewicz, from Toruń's local daily Nowości. He wrote:

The hollow, in which trains crashed, it looked like a nightmare. Dead bodies are everywhere – on roofs of engines and cars, on the sand. Everywhere around me I hear calls for help, crying and weeping. There are doctors, paramedics, rail workers, police and soldiers. The area is covered by slicks of spilled petrol. The smallest spark can ignite an explosion, which will worsen the tragedy. Under the circumstances, only bare hands and basic tools are used. The wounded are stretchered away along a path to ambulances, parked along a nearby road. The passenger train had seven cars, one of which had been completely crushed. Before 8 a.m., there is a pile of bodies by the forest. Soldiers and police keep on bringing more bodies, some of them are so mutilated that even the toughest of men cannot stand the sight. They vomit, trying not to look.

=== List of victims ===
- Alicja Bekier, 18 – Łódź
- Lucyna Bętkowska, 25 – Ustronie Morskie
- Anna Białas, 17 – Sobota
- Marek Białas, 20 – Sobota
- Cecylia Chełkowska, 72 – Toruń
- Ryszard Durys, 28 – Międzyborze
- Marek Frąckiewicz, 28 – Włocławek
- Barbara Gasis, 33 – Włocławek
- Agnieszka Gasis, 7 – Włocławek
- Adam Gniterak, 33 – Biskupiec Pomorski
- Marzenna Golis, 17 – Antoniew
- Anna Gluba – Łódź
- Irena Gluba – Łódź
- Tomasz Gluba – Łódź
- Marianna Głowacka, 68 – Szczecinek
- Józef Głowiński – Toruń
- Barbara Grad, 22 – Jędrzejów
- Danuta Grochocka, 17 – Wałcz
- Wiesław Hajdukiewicz, 19 – Jędrzejewo
- Ludmiła Janiak, 40 – Kępice
- Andrzej Klisiewicz, 22 – Chrostowa
- Tadeusz Kociak, 15 – Aleksandrów Łódzki
- Anastazja Kowalska, 63 – Sitno
- Jadwiga Kowalska, 55 – Grabie
- Wojciech Kula, 33 – Piła
- Czesław Maciejewski, 54 – Bełchatów
- Iwona Mańkowska, 16 – Łódź
- Janina Markiel, 56 – Włocławek
- Marian Markiel, 55 – Włocławek
- Józef Matusiak, 45 – Topólka
- Barbara Matusiak, 42 – Topólka
- Jadwiga Matuszewska, 41 – Łódź
- Wanda Murawska, 39 – Toruń
- Sławomira Mysłowska, 21 – Rakowo-Łobez
- Bożena Niewinna, 17 – Rzeczyca
- Elżbieta Postek, 80 – Wrocław
- Henryk Pisalski, 67 – Łódź
- Anna Przybylak, 25 – Częstochowa
- Paweł Pułko, 23 – Łódź
- Elżbieta Raniszewska, 18 – Grabie
- Halina Reszka, 39 – Łódź
- Jadwiga Rożniatowska, 21 – Zachełmże
- Bogumiła Sikorska, 42 – Toruń
- Jerzy Sikorski, 43 – Toruń
- Leszek Sikorski, 17 – Toruń
- Ireneusz Sikorski, 13 – Toruń
- Janusz Starościak, 23 – Wałcz
- Stanisława Stola, 36 – Łódź
- Wacława Święciak, lat 48 – Bełchatów
- Danuta Święciak, 12 – Bełchatów
- Violetta Świętlicka, 15 – Włocławek
- Wiesław Świętlicki, 18 – Czarnowęsy
- Maria Tybura, 17 – Rzeczyca
- Janusz Wagner, 24 – Bydgoszcz
- Janina Worach, 43 – Łódź
- Józef Worach, 44 – Łódź
- Bogdan Worach, 12 – Łódź
- Marianna Woźniak, 60 – Karlino
- Cecylia Wrzesińska, 50 – Łódź
- Czesław Zadroga, 19 – Wykrot
- Józef Zieliński, 54 – Łódź
- Grzegorz Zieliński, 29 – Bydgoszcz
- Wiesław Żbikowski, 24 – Osiek
- Andrzej Bogusz, 23 – Chojnice
- Józef Głowiński, 28 – Toruń
- Mieczysław Roschek, 43 – Chojnice
- Henryk Różański, 54 – Sierpc

== The investigation ==
Both Polish State Railways and the Polish government opened special commissions. The investigation was initially concentrated on trying the so-called third factor of the tragedy. Apparently, some believed that it was caused by an unknown person, who terrorized crew of the freight train, and before the crash, jumped out into the forest. However, no evidence was found to prove this hypothesis right. Among officials present at the scene, was Edward Gierek, who was flown by a helicopter.

Because August 1980 was a very hectic time in Poland (see: History of Solidarity), wild rumors were rife in the area. People gossiped that the cargo train carried tanks, which were going to be used against workers of the Gdańsk Shipyard. Another rumor had it that activists of the fledgling Solidarity movement from Toruń were in the train, on their way to a meeting in Łódź.

The investigation was closed extremely quickly – on 20 October 1980. It was established that all rail workers involved in the accident were sober and had not taken any drugs. Rail equipment along the track was working properly. Prosecutor Wiesław Merkel of the Toruń's office stated that Mieczysław Roschek was guilty, but since the driver died, further investigation was unnecessary. The last person saved from the wreckage was engineer Gerard Przyjemski, who had hidden himself in the rear of his engine, and who still lives in Toruń. Initially, firemen did not even want to search the inside of the almost completely destroyed engine. It was by accident that one policeman heard his cries for help.

A year after the accident, in late autumn 1981, journalist Zbigniew Juchniewicz wrote a book Train number 5130, which described the accident. The initial print run was 100,000 copies, but almost all were confiscated by Communist censorship. Writing about such tragedies was not appreciated by the government.

== See also ==
- Classification of railway accidents
- History of rail transport in Poland
- Transportation in Poland
- List of Poland disasters by death toll
