= 1995 Gdańsk gas explosion =

Explosion in Poland

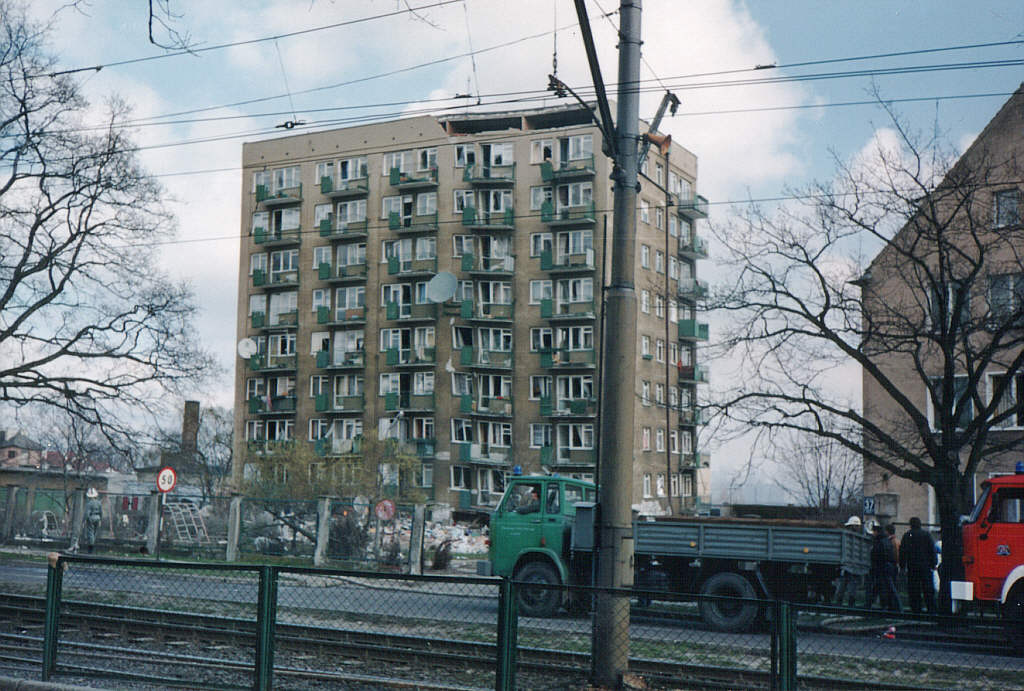
- The affected building after the explosion
- Date: 17 April 1995
- Time: 5:50 a.m. (UTC+02:00)
- Location: al. Wojska Polskiego 39 Strzyża, Gdańsk, Poland; 54.3893°N 18.5811°E
- Cause: Gas leak caused by inhabitant of building
- Deaths: 22
- Injuries: 12

On 17 April 1995 at 5:50 a.m., al. Wojska Polskiego 39, an apartment building located in Strzyża, a district (dzielnica) of the Polish city of Gdańsk, experienced a gas explosion, killing 22 people and injuring 12. Local services faced a difficult rescue and evacuation effort following the disaster due to the dense concentration of rubble around the explosion site and the building's increasing tilt. The next day, the building had to be demolished. Along with the Gdańsk Shipyard hall fire and 1994 Gdańsk bus crash, it was one of the three major disasters the city had faced over the span of less than a year.

After the event, the former inhabitants of the destroyed building received a wide outpouring of public and governmental support, and an investigation occurring soon after the explosion concluded that the likely culprit was the retiree Jerzy Szachowski, who wanted to destroy his apartment in order to receive an insurance payment; thus, the scale was most likely unintentional. Two years after the event, in 1997, a new building was constructed at the destroyed structure's former site.

== Building history prior to disaster ==
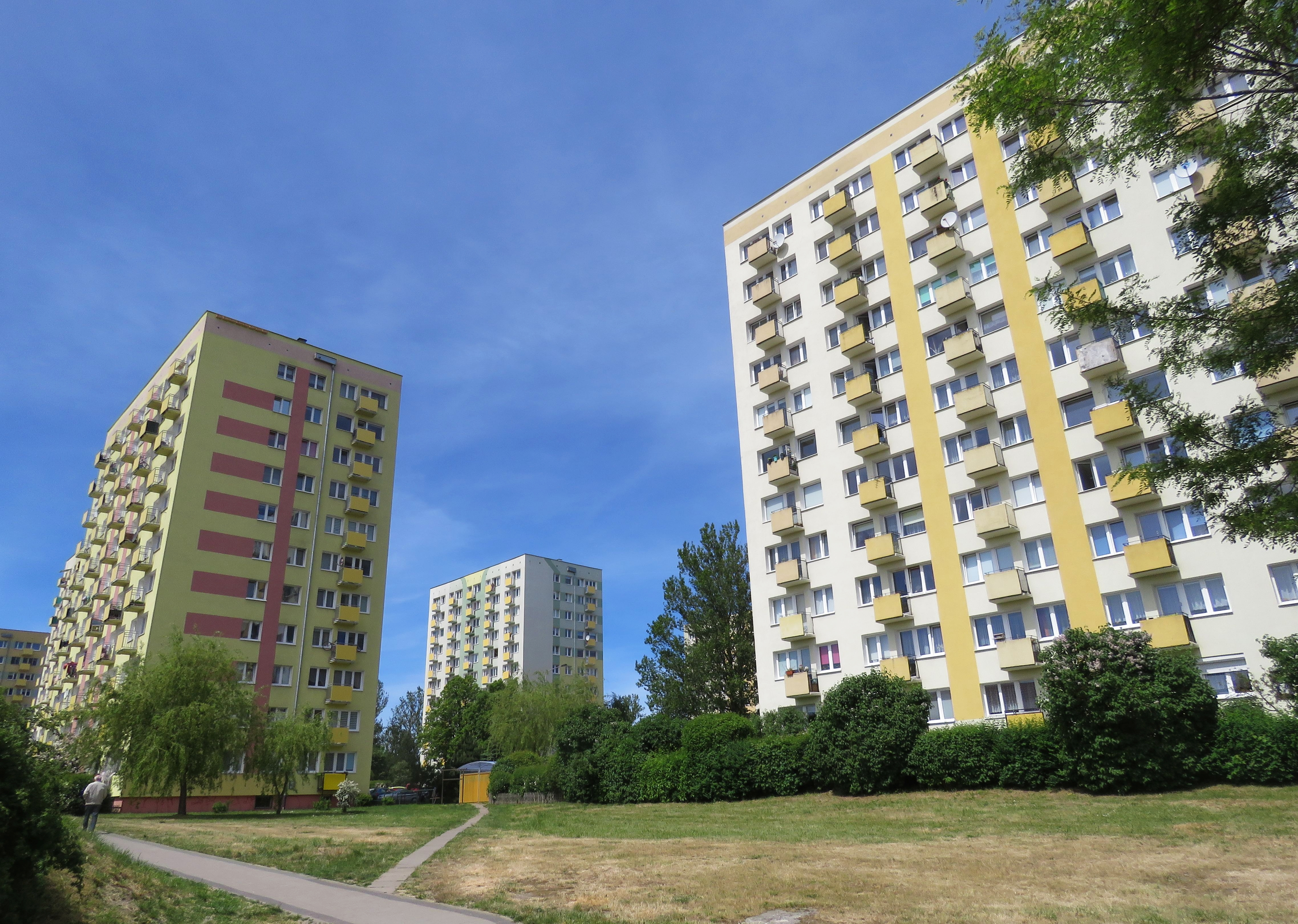
Apartment buildings in Gdynia built identically to al. Wojska Polskiego 39

The 11-storey apartment building at al. Wojska Polskiego 39 was completed in June 1972. Its design, along with that of 200 other such housing blocks, was outlined in project MBY-110Z of the "Miastoprojekt" Gdańsk Design and Research Office of General Construction, and was created by the engineer Jerzy Duszota and architect Janusz Kowalski. Each storey up to half the height of the building was surrounded with reinforced concrete.

In 1989, a homeowners' association, Nasz Dom (Our Home), was established by the inhabitants of the building. As of 1995, a total of 172 people lived in the building's 77 apartments. The exact number of people in the building at the time of the explosion is uncertain, but has been estimated at 140.

== Course of events ==
=== Explosion and beginning of rescue effort ===
On Easter Monday, 17 April 1995, at 5:45 a.m., the emergency gas service in Oliwa was informed by an inhabitant of the building's seventh floor of a gas leak. This report was not received; services were only dispatched at 5:49 a.m., after the emergency gas services in Wrzeszcz were notified of it.

The explosion occurred at 5:50 a.m., destroying the interior walls of the ground floor and pushed out that floor's exterior walls. The next floors then fell, destroying the second floor, as well as much of the third. Because of the use of reinforced concrete, the rest of the building remained stable, settling on top of the destroyed storeys. The sound created by the explosion was heard as far as 1.5 kilometres (0.93 mi) away. The force of the explosion shattered the building's windows and ejected furniture out of apartments. The building then tilted towards the al. Wojska Polskiego.

At 5:53 a.m., an officer of the regional police informed the local fire brigade about the explosion. Already before 6:00 a.m., the No. 1 Rescue and Extinguishing Unit of Wrzeszcz was deployed there and quickly joined by other units. More than 20 ambulances were deployed to the area, alongside groups of rescuers from the Polish Red Cross with search and rescue dogs.

The rescuers began an evacuation of the building's inhabitants shortly after. While many of them left by their own means by walking down the stairs to the undestroyed portions of the third floor, others had to be evacuated by way of ladders and hydraulic lifts. The last inhabitant was evacuated from the building three hours after the explosion. Al. Wojska Polskiego 37, a neighbouring building, was also evacuated.

The unstable building slowly tilted away from a vertical position at a pace of 1 millimetre (0.039 in) per 5 minutes. By the evening, the building had already slanted by 1.5 metres (4.9 ft) towards the street. The rescue effort ended at 2:30 p.m., as the rescuers were unable to reach the buried floors of the building. One rescuer from the Polish Red Cross stated that only 10% of the debris had been inspected.

=== Demolition ===
At the site of the disaster, a commission was appointed, under the leadership of General Inspector of Construction Oversight Andrzej Dobrucki. Around 10:30 p.m., it was decided to destroy the rest of the building, as other means of removal were deemed impossible from a technical point of view. An additional factor was the will to access the lower, buried parts of the building, which were then thought to contain surviving victims; this would be dangerous, as the remaining, unstable upper half of the building would pose a danger to both the rescuers and the rescued.

The method of demolition was developed by specialists from the Military Engineering Department of the Tadeusz Kościuszko Higher Officer School (today known as the General Tadeusz Kościuszko Military University of Land Forces) in Wrocław and experts from the leadership of the Maritime Engineering Department of the Polish Navy. It was approved by Captain Bernard Naskraszewicz and General Commander of the State Fire Brigade Feliks Dela.

Shortly after midnight, in the early hours of 18 April, preparations for demolition began. Local trees, fences, and shrubs were removed. 121.5 kilograms (268 lb) of plastic explosives were installed on the fourth floor. All citizens within 300 metres (980 ft) of the demolition site were evacuated and advised to leave their windows open. The detonating explosion took place just before 1:00 pm. It was said by some to be a failure, as the building was intended to fall forwards, but instead fell straight down, creating a large concentration of rubble. However, experts disagreed, among them Feliks Dela and Jerzy Duszota, determining the method used was, regardless of the aftermath, more reliable than any other method.

=== Continuation and end of rescue operation ===
Removal of rubble took a further two days. The remnants of the building were hauled out to the Gdańsk neighbourhood of Szadółki, where they were then thoroughly inspected. Belongings of inhabitants were also searched for at the building's former site. Live animals were also discovered in the rubble, including a cat and several rodents. Starting on 19 April, the search was carried out by hand.

=== Final assessment ===
22 people were killed in the disaster. Analysis of the victims' corpses showed that all of them had died due to the blast. The rescue effort lasted for 86 hours, with 1676 people taking part in it, using 5 total tonnes of foaming agent to aid in the firefighting effort. The total damages were estimated at 120 million złoty, while the rescue operation cost the city 1 million zł.

== Reactions and aid efforts ==
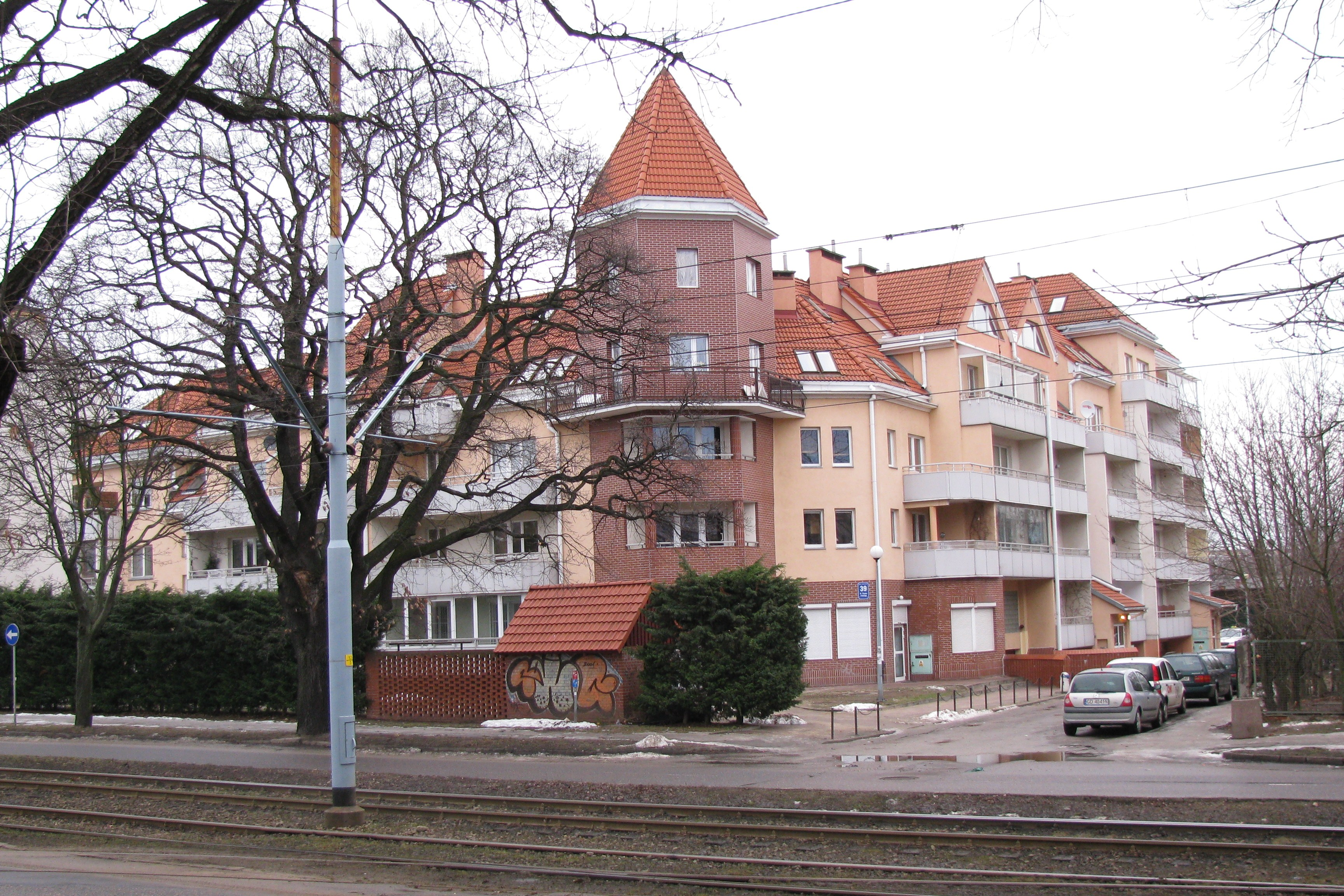
The building today found at al. Wojska Polskiego 39, finished in 1997

Maciej Płażyński, the voivode of Gdańsk Voivodeship, declared 22 April to be a day of mourning. Condolences were expressed by, among others, Tomasz Posadzki, mayor of Gdańsk, and Pope John Paul II.

An effort began to aid those affected by the disaster. Dziennik Bałtycki reported that, within three days of the explosion, the locations for gathering aid materials were "literally swamped with gifts". Prime Minister Józef Oleksy decided to allocate 1 million zł for the reconstruction and purchase of new apartments, and the Minister of Labour and Social Policy, Leszek Miller, sent a further 350 million zł for their furnishings. The city government decided to give each of the affected 300 zł in aid and gave Nowy Dom a million zł for the purpose of rebuilding. Most of the building's former inhabitants agreed to construct a new building where the old one had once stood. The building was finished in 1997 and does not have any link to gas pipelines.

== Investigation ==
It was quickly deemed by experts that the explosion was not caused by an accident. The suggestion that the explosion was caused by a deliberate effort to damage the gas pipes was backed up when, among the rubble, two unscrewed corks for dehydrators were discovered; the corks were located in a basement corridor accessible to most inhabitants. It was agreed that these corks could not have been removed without human input. Alongside them, there were tongue-and-groove pliers adjusted for their size, although there is no conclusive evidence that they were used to unscrew the corks. Measurements concluded that the unscrewing occurred between 4:45 and 4:50 a.m.

The Voivodeship Procuratorate in Gdańsk studied two main theories about the perpetrator. The first placed suspicion upon Jerzy Szachowski, a 60-year-old retiree living on the ground floor of the building. His dead body, dressed to leave, was found in the foyer of the building as one of the first to be found, at 6:05 a.m. He had come into conflict with the homeowners' association and his neighbours and was behind on his rent payments, risking eviction. He had also carried out individual repairs of his apartment, which included creating openings leading to the basement. A few days before the explosion, he began moving his belongings out of his apartment.

The second hypothesis placed the blame on an unidentified thief stealing a pipe valve from the building, but this was rejected. Grażyna Wawryniuk, a spokeswoman for the Gdańsk Regional Procuratorate, stated:

According to the assessment of the procurator, the gathered evidence solely indicated that Jerzy Szachowski compromised the gas installations. He was an inhabitant of the building, working in accordance with an already-devised plan. His likely goal was the destruction of his apartment and obtaining insurance money by those means. He likely did not foresee that his behaviour would result in such devastating consequences. No proof has been uncovered pointing to others being the perpetrators of the event.

It is not known what ultimately caused the explosion. One hypothesis states that it was started by an inhabitant of the building, who went down to the basement to feed the stray cats residing there, turning on the light switch and thus lighting a spark. Another hypothesis, linked to the first, is that it was started by an unintentional fire in Szachowski's apartment, which was noticed by an inhabitant of a nearby building.

Due to the death of the likely perpetrator, on 29 December 1995, the Voivodeship Procuratorate concluded the investigation. In 2016, Sławomir Cenckiewicz stated that the explosion could have been caused by functionaries of the Office of State Protection to remove documents from the apartment of former Security Service (SB) agent Adam Hodysz regarding Lech Wałęsa's possible links to communist secret intelligence. He claimed this was based on conversations with anonymous informants, according to whom the gas explosion was an accidental side effect of the effort to remove the documents. Cenckiewicz's theory was viewed in various ways, from a clue worthy of further investigation to an unsupported attempt at defaming the former president. Wałęsa himself rejected the idea, calling it "incorrect nonsense" and "barbarism". The National Public Prosecutor's Office began an inquiry into this matter, but concluded with the decision not to go forward with an investigation. The theory was also publicly rejected by historian and intelligence services expert Robert Wierzbicki.

== Commemoration ==
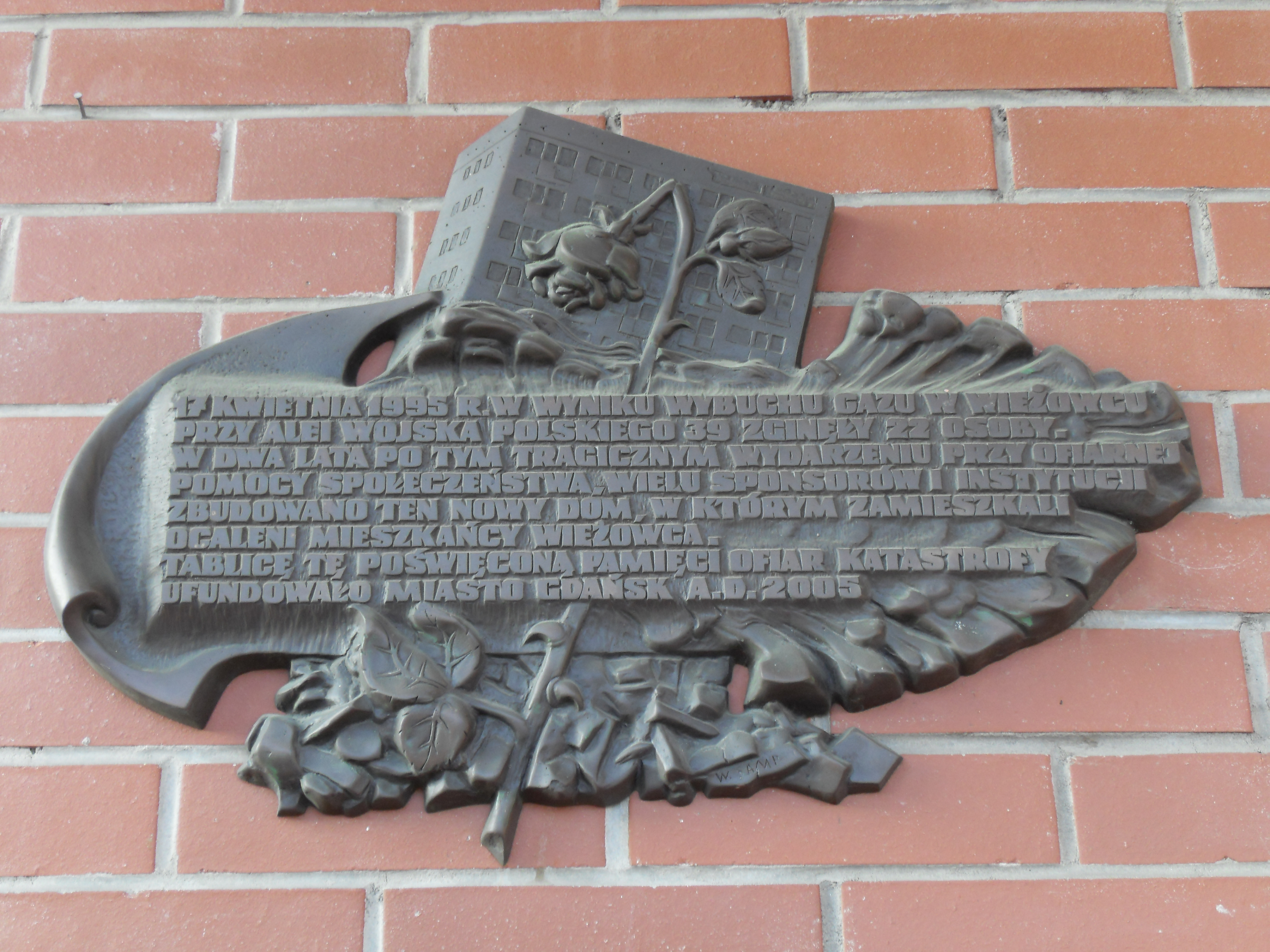
The monument commemorating the explosion

On 17 April 2005, on the walls of the new building, a plaque commemorating the disaster was put up. The text on it read (when translated into English):

On 17 April 1995, as the result of a gas explosion, in the apartment block at al. Wojska Polskiego 39, 22 people were killed. Two years after this tragic event, with the help of the community, many sponsors, and institutions, this new home was built, where the rescued inhabitants of the block moved in. This monument dedicated to the memory of the victims of the catastrophe was funded by the city of Gdańsk, A.D. 2005

== Sources ==
- Duszota, Jerzy (2005). "Wpływ rozwiązań konstrukcyjnych na zachowanie się budynku w czasie wybuchu gazu w 1995 roku w Gdańsku" (PDF). Inżynieria i Budownictwo. 67 (6): 298–303. Archived from the original (PDF) on 11 April 2020.
- Pasztelańska, Joanna (2018). Strażacy: Tam, gdzie zaczyna się bohaterstwo. Społeczny Instytut Wydawniczy „Znak”. p. 108–126. ISBN 978-83-240-5464-0.
- Reszka, Jarosław (2001). Cześć, giniemy! Największe katastrofy w powojennej Polsce. Warsaw: Wydawnictwo PAP. p. 152–159. ISBN 83-911242-3-1.
- Rószkowski, Andrzej (2012). Była taka akcja... (PDF). Józefów: Centrum Naukowo-Badawcze Ochrony Przeciwpożarowej im. Józefa Tuliszkowskiego Państwowego Instytutu Badawczego. p. 181–192. ISBN 978-83-61520-13-9. Archived from the original (PDF) on 2017-08-13.
