= Motława ferry disaster =

1975 shipping disaster

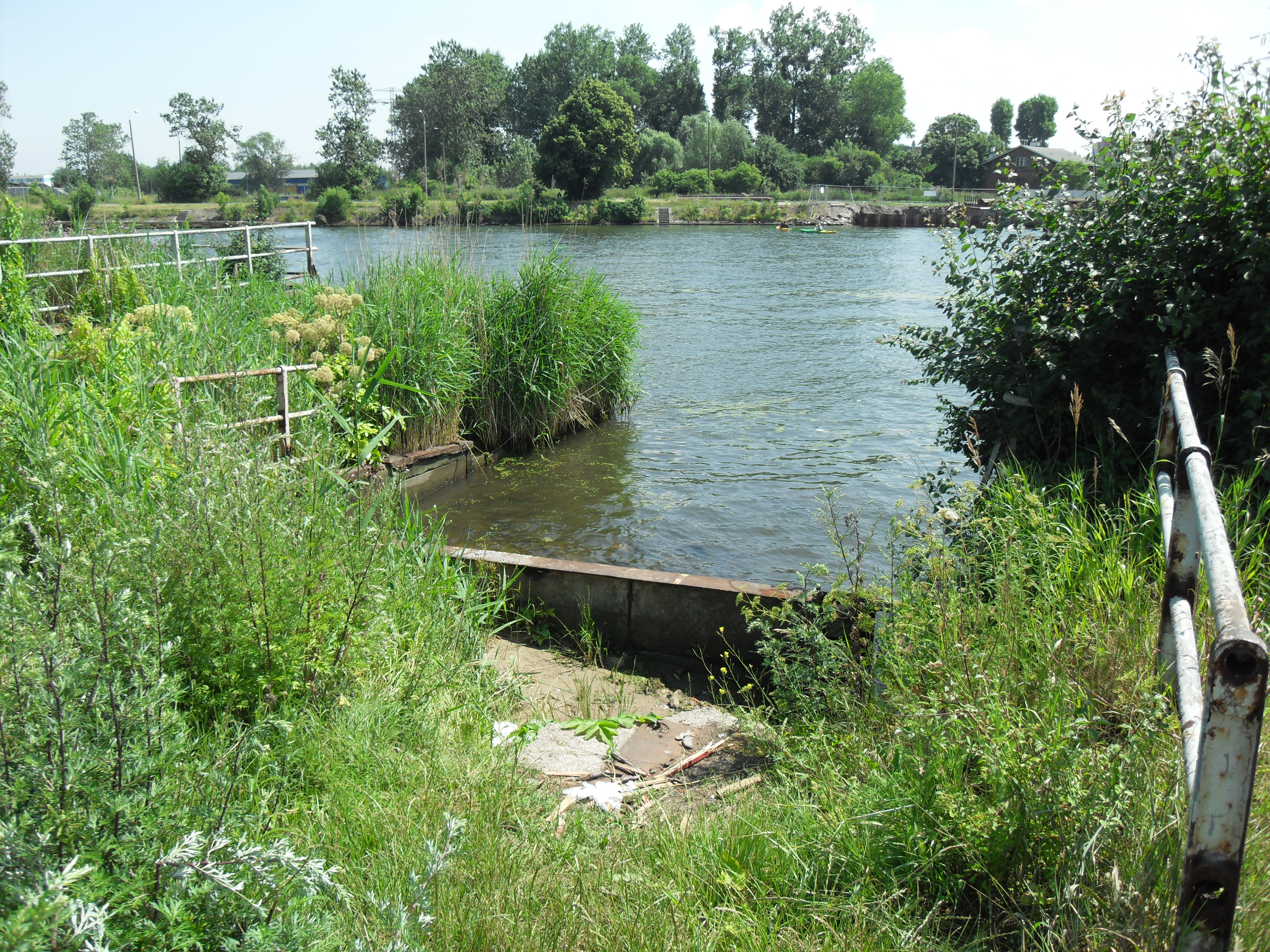
- The site of the disaster in 2011
- Date: August 1, 1975
- Time: 3:00 p.m. (UTC+02:00)
- Location: Śródmieście, Gdańsk; 54.3546°N 18.6660°E
- Cause: Snagging of ferry cable by passing ship
- Outcome: Sinking of the ferry in around 1 minute; 18 of the 40 passengers killed

The Motława ferry disaster was a cable ferry shipwreck that happened on 1 August 1975 on the Motława in the city of Gdańsk, causing 18 deaths among the passengers.

== Background ==
At the time of the sinking, St. Dominic's Fair was happening in Gdańsk, causing an influx of tourists into the city. In the northern area of the city centre, between Wiosna Ludów and Sienna Grobla Streets, a cable ferry service operated on the Motława. At times during the fair, it was reported that the ferries running the route were handling up to 75 passengers at once. The ferry involved in the sinking, ferry no. 2, had a tin roof amidships, as well as tarpaulin walls. However, it had no ballast tanks.

== Sinking ==
At 2:45 p.m. CEST (UTC+02:00) on 1 August 1975, the ferry, commanded by ferryman Jerzy Kozłowski, docked in Sienna Grobla and boarded a new load of 40 passengers for the voyage to Wiosny Ludów. However, the voyage was delayed by traffic in the Motława River—first, by a passing motorboat of the Milicja Obywatelska, then by the charter cruise ship Lucyna. The wave that the passing of these ships caused resulted in the ferry being pushed away from its dock and down the cables.

At the same time, the Żegluga Gdańska cruise ship Maryla was sailing down the Motława, in the ferry's vicinity. Kozłowski panicked and clamped the grip of the ferry's propulsion mechanism onto the cable, hoping to guide it back to shore, but he also tightened the cable with the motion. As Maryla passed near ferry no. 2, it snagged the tightened cable and pulled the ferry down, causing it to sink within a minute. Several passengers survived, but many others were sucked down with the ship, or given no chance of escape because of the tin roof above them preventing it.

== Aftermath ==
Immediately after the ferry sank, rescue operations began. The captain of the Maryla, as well as a few nearby vessels, began aiding survivors. For the next 2 days, bodies were recovered from the wreck until all 18 dead were found. 15 of the bodies were found attached to the ceiling of the vessel. The ferryman was sentenced to 11 months in prison in January 1977.
