= Otłoczyn =

- Village
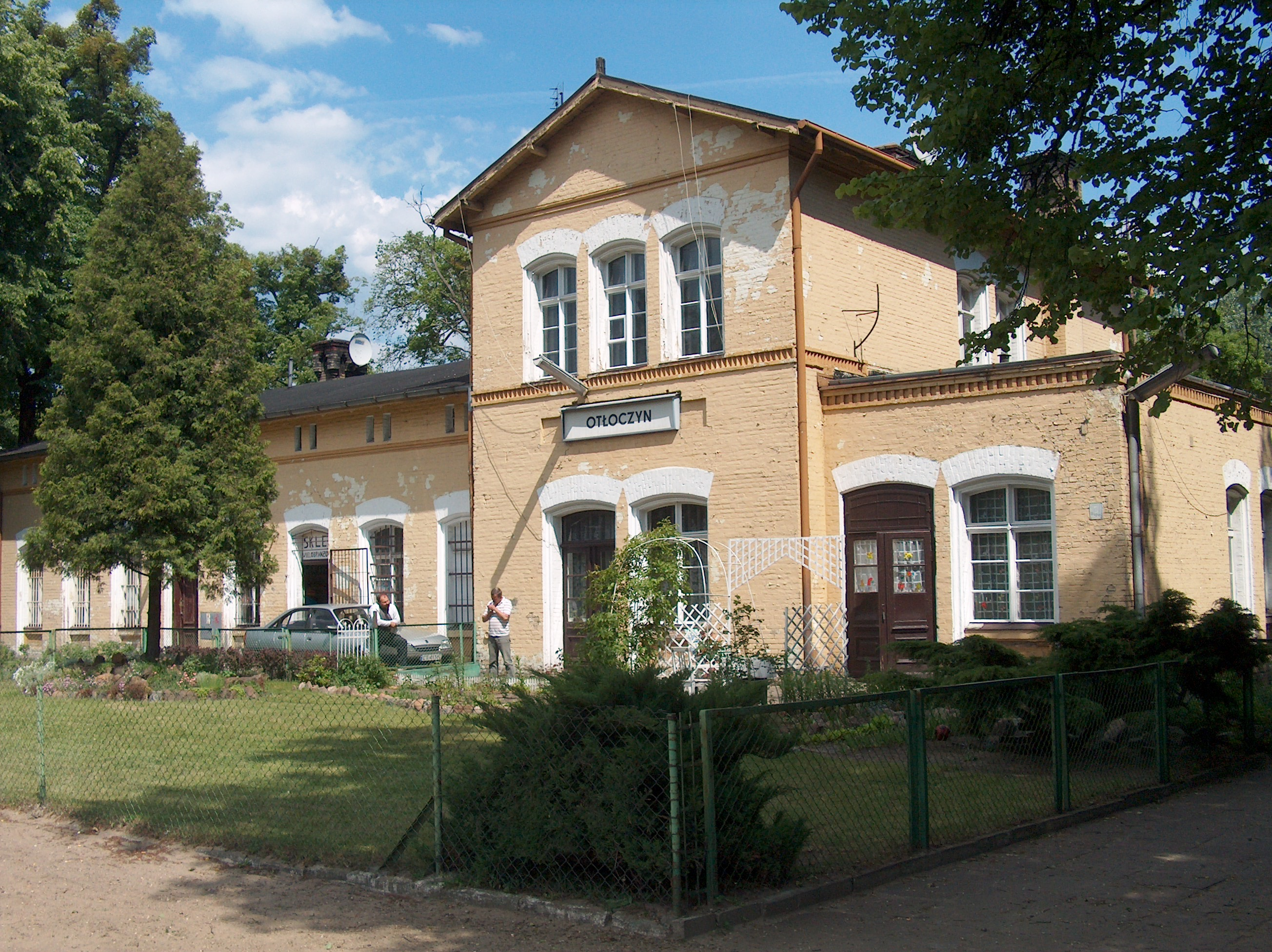
- Train station

- Location within Poland
- Coordinates: 52°54′27″N 18°43′35″E
- Country: Poland
- Voivodeship: Kuyavian-Pomeranian
- County: Aleksandrów
- Gmina: Aleksandrów Kujawski

Population
  - Total: 577

Otłoczyn [ɔtˈwɔt͡ʂɨn] is a village in the administrative district of Gmina Aleksandrów Kujawski, within Aleksandrów County, Kuyavian-Pomeranian Voivodeship, in north-central Poland.

It is known for the Otłoczyn railway accident.
