= 1980 Górna Grupa psychiatric hospital fire =

Hospital fire in Poland

Coordinates: 53.4333°N 18.7166°E

- Date: October 31, 1980
- Time: 23:00 CET
- Location: Górna Grupa, Poland
- Cause: leak in the chimney flue
- Deaths: 55
- Injuries: 26

The 1980 Górna Grupa psychiatric hospital fire occurred on the night of October 31 to November 1, 1980, in what was then the Polish People's Republic. Fifty-five patients were killed, and 26 were seriously injured.

The facility in Górna Grupa was a branch of the State Hospital for the Nervous and Mentally Ill in Świecie. It was housed in a 19th-century palace. Due to underfunding and years of neglect, fire protection measures were exceptionally poor. The fire, most likely caused by a leak in the chimney flue, was discovered too late. A combination of several factors led to a chaotic rescue operation conducted under extremely difficult conditions.

The tragedy in Górna Grupa inspired numerous Polish cultural works. However, the victims could only be properly commemorated after Poland's democratic transition in 1989.

== Background ==
In the 19th century, a three-story palace was built near the village of Górna Grupa. It was owned by the Bismarck family, and the sister of German Chancellor Otto von Bismarck lived there. After World War I, Górna Grupa, along with the rest of Kociewie, became part of the newly reborn Polish state. The Bismarck estate was taken over by the land office in Grudziądz. In 1922, it was sold to the Society of the Divine Word congregation. On the eve of the missionaries’ official takeover of the estate, the palace was set on fire in an act of arson, the perpetrators of which remain unknown. Nevertheless, by 1927, the Verbites had rebuilt the palace, establishing a religious house, seminary, high school, and retreat house on the site.

During the German occupation from 1939 to 1945, the Verbites were removed from Górna Grupa, and the palace was repurposed as a German headquarters, shooting range, and prison. In 1945, after the end of the World War II, the Divine Word Missionaries returned to the estate. However, in 1952, the Polish communist authorities nationalized the property. Only five Divine Word Missionaries were allowed to remain in Górna Grupa. A psychiatric hospital—a branch of the State Hospital for the Nervous and Mentally Ill in Świecie—was established in the former monastery building. Over the next 28 years, little effort was made to properly adapt the building to the hospital's needs or to renovate and modernize it. Most of the work was limited to dividing the large halls with partition walls made of fiberboard.

In the early 1980s, the hospital in Górna Grupa faced challenges typical of psychiatric care in the Polish People's Republic: underfunding, staff shortages, overcrowding, and poor technical conditions. The 19th-century building had wooden ceilings, some of which were reinforced with steel beams. The wooden floors were covered with flammable PVC flooring, and the wall insulation consisted of flammable materials such as moss, pine needles, and sawdust. Patients were housed in wards accommodating 20 or even 40–50 people. The hospital beds were packed so densely that, due to the lack of space, patients had to walk over their neighbors' beds. Witnesses also reported that the corridors had closed passages, which hindered safe evacuation. Each room had about 50 beds, and all clothing was kept on the beds since there were no cabinets. The windows were dirty and were never opened. The hospital had no toilets, so patients had to urinate in buckets.

The needs of patients received little attention. Many had been effectively abandoned by their families, who had not maintained contact with them for years. Patients were herded into a room and left to their own devices for most of the day. A common practice was to "rent out" mildly ill patients to local farmers for farmwork. The use of electroconvulsive therapy was also widespread, and sanitary conditions in the hospital were poor. After undergoing electroconvulsive therapy, patients frequently developed seizures, and were restrained by staff.

The poor state of fire protection had been noted even before the fire outbreak. During a fire inspection at the hospital in September 1979, numerous deficiencies were identified. Inspectors reported that immobile patients were placed on the highest floors, the wards were overcrowded, and there were no evacuation stairs. Furthermore, some evacuation exits had been removed or blocked with heavy wardrobes to prevent patients from escaping. Despite these findings, the post-inspection recommendations were ignored.

== Fire ==
On the night of October 31 to November 1, 1980, over 300 patients were present at the hospital in Górna Grupa (according to some sources, the number may have exceeded 400). In addition to individuals with mental disorders and severe intellectual disabilities, the hospital also housed people considered socially maladjusted for various reasons.

The fire began on the third floor, where 125 men—many of whom were the most seriously ill and least able-bodied—were staying. Four nurses were on duty that night. Only one had several years of experience, while the other three had been in the profession for just four months. At 11:00 p.m., following hospital regulations, the nurses locked all the patient rooms from the outside. While they prepared dinner in the social room, a patient known as "Ali" was assigned to monitor the corridor. "Ali", who was known in the hospital for his pyromania, was the first to notice the fire and tried to alert the nurses. Unfortunately, his cries were ignored due to his history.

At some point, the hospital's electricity went out, caused by a failure in the electrical system due to the spreading fire. Initially, this did not raise significant concern among the staff, as power outages were common during the economic crisis of the Polish People's Republic.

At that time, Andrzej Rutkowski was a hospital stoker and maintenance worker. While staying in his flat in the residential part of the hospital building, he noticed that lights were still on in other parts of Górna Grupa, indicating the outage was not external. He went to check the fuses but smelled smoke, quickly realizing the severity of the situation. Rutkowski grabbed a pickaxe from the basement and, with the help of neighbors, began breaking through the brick wall separating the residential area from the hospital. However, the intense heat from the opening made entry impossible. Meanwhile, the nurses on the third floor became aware of the fire. Moving blindly through the smoke, they managed to unlock one of the patient rooms. From there, they shouted for help through the specially secured windows. Panic erupted among the patients on the second and third floors, and the situation quickly spiraled out of control.

After just a few minutes, a volunteer fire brigade from Górna Grupa arrived at the hospital. By midnight, seven fire brigades were on-site. However, the rescue operation was chaotic and conducted under extremely difficult conditions. The firefighters lacked the necessary equipment, including flashlights, ropes, fire helmets and stretchers. The pond in the hospital garden was polluted with leaves, preventing the fire pumps from drawing water. The fire hydrant in the yard was also non-functional, delaying efforts until water tenders arrived. Firefighters managed to widen the hole in the brick wall made by the employees, but without heat-resistant suits, they could not enter the burning ward. Ultimately, only one severely burned patient was rescued from the ward. Later, soldiers from a nearby military garrison joined the operation, but they, too, lacked specialized equipment, and their gas masks were ineffective in the fire conditions.

The rescue effort was further hindered by the behavior of long-term patients, for whom the hospital was the only reality they knew. Many remembered the strict staff instructions not to leave their rooms. As a result, they panicked at the sight of firefighters and soldiers, refusing to evacuate. Some resisted or hid under beds, while others, after being led out, returned to retrieve personal belongings. The situation was brought under control only after rescuers donned white coats. Several panicked patients fled the hospital on their own, running into nearby forests and villages, where police officers later located them. Others waited outside the burning building in the seven-degree frost, dressed only in pajamas, slippers, or even barefoot. Meanwhile, a crowd of onlookers from neighboring towns gathered outside the hospital, reportedly numbering over a thousand people, according to witnesses.

The fire quickly spread throughout the building. The roof and ceilings between the floors collapsed. In one of the 40-person wards, where patients were still present, the floor gave way, burying the Divine Word Missionaries' chapel below. Some patients burned alive on their beds, strapped down with belts. Others, trapped in panic, were trampled or succumbed to asphyxiation while waiting for help near the doors. The scale of the tragedy could have been even greater if the hospital's gas cylinders had exploded. This disaster was narrowly averted by the heroic actions of three soldiers who, without orders and at great personal risk, removed the cylinders from the burning building.

Once the fire was extinguished, conscript soldiers were ordered by the secretary of the local Polish United Workers' Party committee to remove the bodies. Witnesses recounted that many of the victims' bodies were grotesquely deformed by the fire, leaving even experienced rescuers, let alone conscripts, traumatized. Nervous breakdowns were common among those who witnessed the aftermath.

=== Cause ===
The most likely cause of the fire was a leaky chimney flue. It is believed that a spark escaped from the flue and ignited a fire within one of the walls, which were insulated with pine needles and sawdust.

Before the fire erupted, it smoldered within the walls. At least a day before the tragedy, some patients reported smelling smoke and noticing that the hospital walls felt unusually warm. However, their concerns went unheeded.

=== Victims ===
The fire claimed the lives of 52 patients. Three others succumbed to their injuries while in the hospital, bringing the total number of fatalities to 55. An additional 26 patients sustained severe burns. "Ali" initially survived the fire, but died three days later in a hospital in Świecie.

Victims of the fire were buried on December 11, 1980, in a mass grave at the hospital's cemetery. Janusz Janczewski, a doctor that responded to the fire, said that the grave was dug with heavy machinery.

== Aftermath and investigation ==
The day after the fire in Górna Grupa, Deputy Prime Minister Henryk Kisiel and Deputy Minister of Health Tadeusz Szelachowski visited the site. Investigations into the tragedy's causes were conducted independently by the voivodship prosecutor's office, a special government commission, and a commission appointed by the Bydgoszcz voivode.

On December 12, 1980, the following government statement was published:

The government commission headed by Deputy Prime Minister Stanisław Mach, appointed to determine the circumstances of the fire in Górna Grupa belonging to the Voivodeship Psychiatric Complex in Świecie, reports that as a result of the dedicated work of people and a well-organized rescue operation, 266 out of 319 patients were saved and the fire was prevented from spreading to the entire hospital building [...] After completing all necessary activities, the government commission will make a full statement public.

Initially, it was suspected that the fire was caused by an electrical failure. The Milicja Obywatelska briefly considered the possibility that it had been started by the aforementioned pyromaniac, "Ali," but this hypothesis was quickly dismissed.

The prosecutor's office ultimately brought charges against two hospital employees: Jan Górski, deputy director for economic and financial affairs, and Mieczysław Chyla, head of the administrative and economic department. They were accused of failing to fulfill their duties and endangering patients' health and lives by neglecting the recommendations of the 1979 fire inspection. The trial began in the autumn of 1981, but Górski passed away before its conclusion. The case was ultimately dismissed under the 1984 amnesty.

Many in the Polish psychiatric community argued that both employees had been made scapegoats and that the real culprits were high-ranking Communist Party officials who had denied funding for the hospital's modernization. Shortly after the tragedy, the group of Polish psychiatrists sent a letter to the Health and Physical Culture Committee of the Sejm, which included the following statement:

Anyone familiar with the conditions in which most psychiatric hospitals in Poland operate may be surprised that the tragedy did not claim more victims.

The tragedy in Górna Grupa became the subject of conspiracy theories. One rumor suggested that the fire had been deliberately started by officers of the Security Service and that its victims included democratic opposition activists allegedly imprisoned in the hospital as part of punitive psychiatry. However, findings from the Institute of National Remembrance confirm that these rumors were unfounded.

The psychiatric hospital in Górna Grupa never resumed operations. Following the democratic transition of 1989, the deteriorated building was reclaimed and renovated by the Divine Word Missionaries. Today, it houses Saint Joseph's Mission House, which includes a ward for elderly monks. The building's basement also features a missionary-ethnographic museum.

== Commemoration ==
The communist authorities did not permit the victims to be named or the cause of their death to be mentioned on the tombstone. Instead, on the orders of the secretary of the Communist Party committee in Świecie, a plaque inscribed only with "NN" (Latin abbreviation for Nomen Nescio, meaning "Name Unknown") was placed on the mass grave.

It was not until 2010 that a marble plaque bearing the names of 46 of the 55 victims was unveiled. Furthermore, on September 19, 2017, commemorative boulder with a plaque was installed on the monastery grounds. It bears the following inscription:

…A voice is heard, mourning and great weeping, Rachel weeping for her children and refusing to be comforted, because they are no more (Jer 31:15).

In memory of the patients, victims of the tragic fire at the Branch of the Voivodship Psychiatric Complex in Świecie, on the night of October 31, 1980, with heartfelt prayers from the Divine Word Missionary Priests.

Górna Grupa. September 19, 2017.

== In culture ==
The fire at the psychiatric hospital in Górna Grupa inspired Polish songwriter and poet Jacek Kaczmarski to write the song A my nie chcemy uciekać stąd! (en. And We Don't Want to Run Away from Here!). The music was composed by Przemysław Gintrowski. The song gained significant popularity in the 1980s and was interpreted as a metaphor for Poland during the martial law period. In the 1989 Polish drama Ostatni Dzwonek (en. The Last School bell), it was performed by Jacek Wójcicki.

Polish youth novel Tam gdzie zawracają bociany (en. Where the Storks Turn Back) by Joanna Jagiełło was also inspired by the tragedy in Górna Grupa.

The theme of the psychiatric hospital fire in Górna Grupa appears in the 2014 Polish crime film Jeziorak (directed by Michał Otłowski).
