= Gdańsk Shipyard hall fire =

1994 fire in Gdańsk, Poland

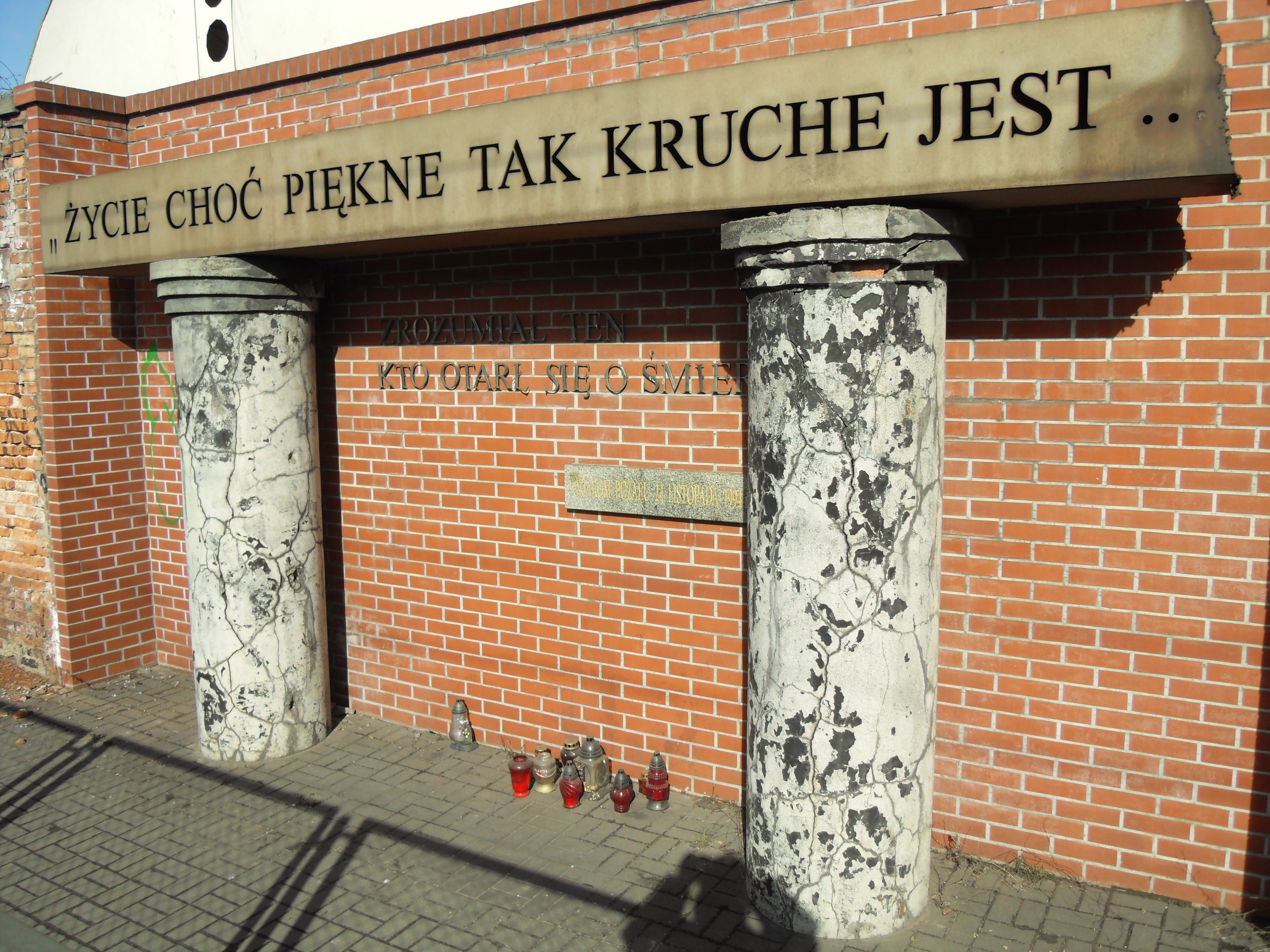
- Monument to the victims of the fire
- Date: 24 November 1994
- Venue: Gdańsk Shipyard hall
- Location: Gdańsk, Poland
- Type: Fire
- Cause: Arson
- Deaths: 7
- Injuries: 320

The Gdańsk Shipyard hall fire (Polish: Pożar w hali Stoczni Gdańskiej) took place on 24 November 1994 during a concert by the band Golden Life in the Gdansk Shipyard Hall in Gdańsk. 7 people died as a result of the fire.

== Incident ==
On 24 November 1994, in the performance hall at Jan z Kolna Street, a music event was taking place – a concert of the Golden Life band, and later a live broadcast of the MTV awards was to be shown. About 2000 people came to the concert – mostly young people (13–20 years old). One hour after the Golden Life musicians left the stage (about 20:50), a fire was noticed on a wooden stand in the back of the hall. At first, no one was alarmed – it was thought to be a light effect. Security tried to put out the fire quickly themselves, but to no avail. The fire quickly spread to the curtains and wooden roof. When the lights went out, panic broke out. Everyone rushed to the only known exit from the hall – the main exit, which was not fully accessible. People fell over each other and were scalded by the hot air. Among the fatalities of the fire were two people: 13-year-old Dominika Powszuk trampled by a fleeing crowd; Sky Orunia TV operator Wojciech Klawinowski, who returned to the burning hall to carry TV equipment out of it. Another five people died in hospitals as a result of serious injuries, including two security guards who had earlier carried unconscious people out of the burning hall. About 320 people were injured, and the most severely burned were taken to the Specialist Hospital for Burns Treatment in Siemianowice Śląskie. Bogusław Borys, a psychologist, was sent to work with the survivors of the fire and diagnosed most of them with post-traumatic stress disorder. The cause of the fire was arson, and the perpetrator was never identified.

== Aftermath ==
The organisers of the event were charged with failing to ensure unobstructed emergency exits and bypassing basic fire safety rules. Ryszard G., (the manager of the hall at the time of the fire) was sentenced to 2 years suspended sentence. Jarosław K. and Tomasz T. (the organizers of the concert, both were employed by Agencji Reklamowej FM) were initially acquitted, but after an appeal by the prosecutor's office they were both sentenced to one year in prison and two years of a suspended sentence. Jan S., the leader of the private fire brigade that responded to the fire, was acquitted. The criminal trial lasted 16 years.

Golden Life later commemorated the fire in a song called "24.11.94". The victims meet at the memorial every year on the anniversary of the fire.
