= Górna Grupa =

Village in Kociewie

- Village
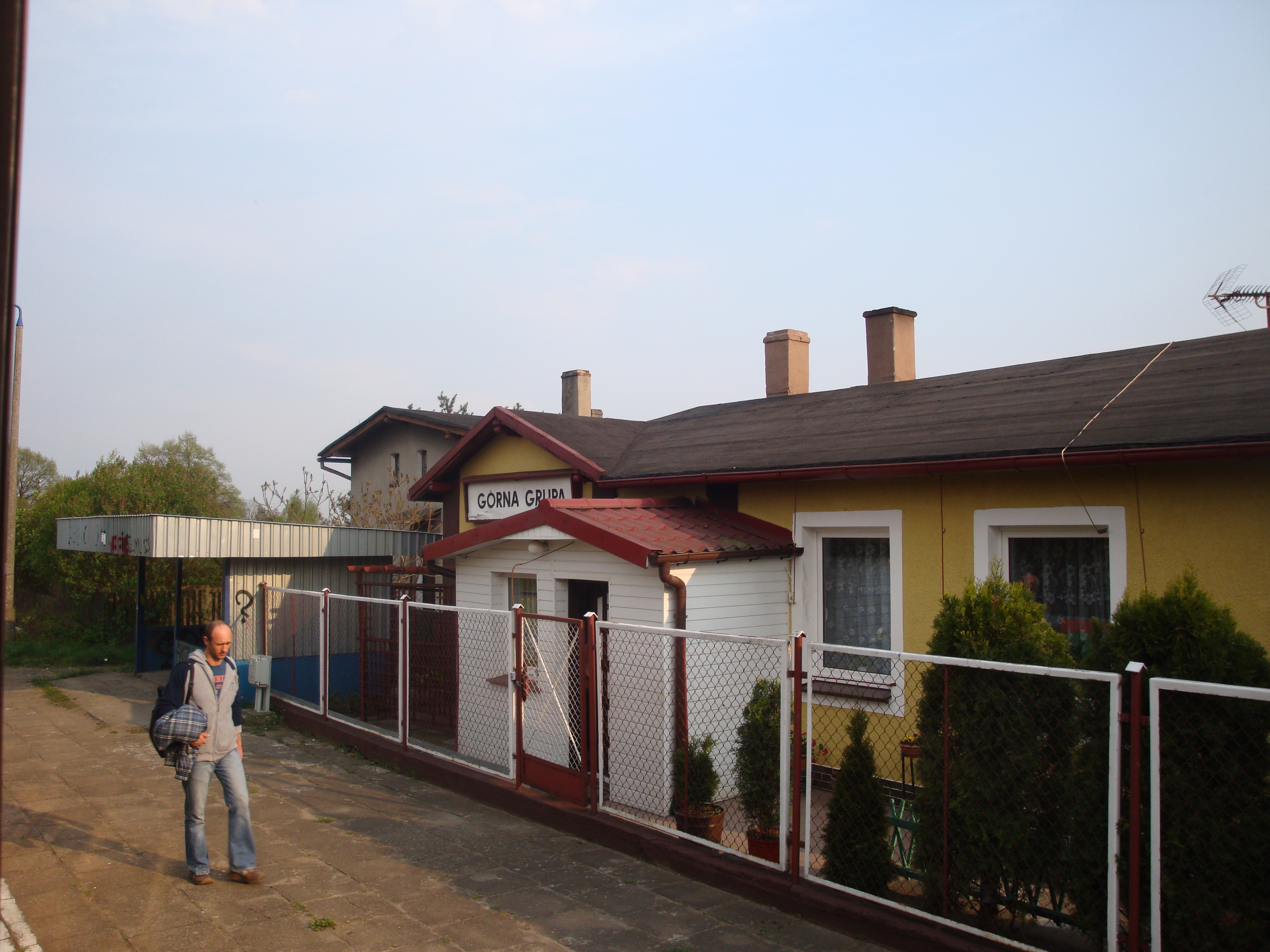
- Exterior view of the railway station

- Location within Poland
- Coordinates: 53°28′59″N 18°40′0″E
- Country: Poland
- Voivodeship: Kuyavian-Pomeranian
- County: Świecie
- Gmina: Dragacz
- Population: 580

Górna Grupa (Polish pronunciation: [ˈɡurna ˈɡrupa]) is a village in the administrative district of Gmina Dragacz, within Świecie County, Kuyavian-Pomeranian Voivodeship, in north-central Poland. Górna Grupa is located within the ethnocultural region of Kociewie.

== Psychiatric hospital fire ==
On 1 November 1980, a fire broke out at the Górna Grupa Psychiatric Hospital. 55 patients died and 26 were injured. It was the deadliest hospital fire and one of the most tragic fires to have occurred in Polish history. This event inspired the Polish poet and songwriter Jacek Kaczmarski to write the song A my nie chcemy uciekać stąd (en: And we don't want to run away from here).
