= Javornica kod Bizeka =

Cave on Mount Medvednica

- Location within Croatia
- Interactive map of Javornica kod Bizeka
- Location: Zagreb
- Coordinates: 45.840000°N 15.857286°E
- Depth: 28 metres (92 ft)
- Length: 330 metres (0.21 mi)
- Elevation: 306 metres (1,004 ft)
- Discovery: 1959
- Geology: Karst cave
- Hazards: flooding
- Access: damaged

Javornica kod Bizeka is the second longest cave on the Medvednica massif, at 330 m or 306 m, depending on the method of measurement. It is adjacent to the Bizek rock quarry, which endangered and partly destroyed it.

== Etymology ==
The name "Javornica" derives was given to it in commemoration of the Planinarsko društvo "Javor" mountaineering society, from which most of its first explorers had come, although by that time they were members of the PDS "Velebit".

== Description ==
The entrance to the cave is at 306 m above sea level through a 14 m deep pit.

The entrance pit leads into a roughly 10×20 m chamber up to 5 m high with a sloped floor covered in stone blocks that have fallen from the roof over geological time, in which fossils can be found. The most represented fossils are Pecten species. In the center of the chamber are two white stalagmites, and on the roof in places a number of brown and white stalactites. The total elevation difference from the entrance to the lowest floor is 28 m.

The entrance pit extends both to the southeast and to the northwest.

The southeast continuation in the direction of the rock quarry is reached from a clay slope, ending in a 40 m long canal called Puzavac with a low roof and a stream at the bottom, the roof sloping from 3 m to 1.5 m. This stream resurfaces there from its subterranean ponor to the northwest. The roof of Puzavac is decorated with numerous stalactites, covered in a thin layer of clay and remains of leaves and branches deposited at high water.

Beyond Puzavac, flow tracing with fluorescein showed that the stream running through Puzavac rises again inside the quarry at the Javornica spring, used for the potable water supply of Bizek and part of Gornji Stenjevec. The above ground stream that flows from Javornica is known as the Dolje.

The northwest continuation in the direction of the polje of Križevščak leads to a somewhat smaller chamber with an uneven, angled floor. It ends in several narrow pits from which the sound of the stream can be heard. Continuing from there requires crawling through 15 m of low, winding passage whose floor is covered in a thick layer of wet clay, ending in a 3 m drop into a chamber where the stream flows openly again, ending in a subterranean ponor beneath that drop.

In this chamber, a narrow side-passage entered above a large clay mound to the right continues northeast until it ends in a rockfall, while the chamber itself continues as a large canal. Following the stream, the canal widens into a chamber of even greater dimensions than the entrance chamber, with a flat, plain roof about 8 m high and a floor with thin white stalagmites up to 1 m high. Continuing along the canal from there, the cave becomes relatively rich with speleothems, in various shapes and various shades of white, gray, and brown, with brown dominating. Towards the end of the larger part of this canal there is a narrow side-passage in the roof to the left, winding 20 m vertically and ending in a 10 m tall chimney whose end has not been reached because of rockfall dangers.

Continuing along the main canal, there is a small waterfall from which the final chamber of the cave can be reached either along the stream below, or through a 4-6 m high gallery sometimes completely separated from the stream by natural bridges and relatively rich with speleothems ending in a small labyrinth.

The final chamber is about 10 m long and somewhat less wide. This chamber has fewer speleothems, but several cracks at the end transmit black earth from the surface at high water level, and at the floor are two springs. The total distance traversed by the stream along the main canals is 250 m.

These two springs are known from a flow tracing experiment to derive from the surface ponors of the Križevščak polje.

== History ==
The cave was first mapped in 1963 by Hrvoje Malinar and Ivan Filipčić.

It remained unexplored until 1959 when Filipčić and Tomislav Imenšek discovered its entrance, dropping a rock through the entrance. But the entrance was only about 10 cm wide and required widening with dynamite, carried out by Weingärtner, director of the Firefighter's School in Zagreb. Several years later, caver Tomislav Jutrović used a club to break up the remaining rocks blocking the entrance. The first to descend the newly widened entrance was Zlatko Špiljar, who descended with a ladder to 15 m and confirmed that a stream ran below.

At the next exploration, the cave was mapped to a cumulative passage length of 70 m.

In 1963, the cave was mapped to its current known passage length.

Later on, the cave entrance and much of the cave was buried and/or destroyed by further exploitation of the rock quarry.

== Hydrology ==
Javornica kod Bizeka was classified by Garašić as a percolating speleo-feature, (Note: At a human scale, since neither its ponor nor its spring are accessible by humans.) like Veternica on the same massif, with an active water stream percolating through it, but neither coming from the surface through a ponor nor having a spring at its entrance.

== Geology ==
Th cave formed along a fault at the contact between soft Lithoamnion limestone formed at depth and an underlying layer of hard Triassic dolostone.

== Fauna ==
The shrimp Typhlocaris has been found in the stream of the cave. Occasionally, the crayfish Austropotamobius torrentium is swept through into the back of the cave through the springs from the ponors beyond.

== See also ==
- List of caves on Zagrebačka gora
- List of longest Dinaric caves
