= Velebitaška jama =

Cave on Mount Medvednica

Veternica
- Batinova jama, Jama na Jazbinjaku
- Location within Croatia
- Interactive map of Veternica
- Location: Zagreb
- Coordinates: 45.845957°N 15.868496°E
- Depth: 45 metres (148 ft)
- Length: 70 metres (0.043 mi)
- Elevation: 417 metres (1,368 ft)
- Discovery: 1971
- Geology: Karst cave
- Entrances: 1
- Cadastral code: HR01426

Velebitaška jama, also known as Batinova jama or Jama na Jazbinjaku, is the deepest pit cave and second deepest cave on the Medvednica massif behind Veternica, at 45 m, at one point the deepest. It is located in an area with many pit caves, but is one of the largest among these, with a complex horizontal and vertical morphology that brings the total length of the cave to 95 m. It has been described as the "most significant" pit cave on its massif. The cave is under special protection, and is closed to the public.

== Description ==
The entrance to the cave is at 417 m above sea level, and its deepest point at 372 m above sea level. The entrance is narrow, at only 1×1 m, widening after 4 m, dropping 12 m to a ledge and then 30 m to the bottom of the entrance chamber.

The entrance chamber has branches and bones at the base.

From the base of the main chamber there are a number of narrow, difficult to pass vertical canals leading to a horizontal canal with a stream flowing southwest. But two crevice systems are found in the cave: one 20-200° followed by the stream angled gently to the northwest, and one 140-320° nearly vertical.

The canal with the stream very narrow and only 30–50 cm high, and has been explored to a total length of 51 m. Further exploration is not possible without alteration because the height lowers to 10 cm. The water from this canal likely flows into the Velebitaški kanal within Veternica.

== History ==
The entrance was discovered in 1971, but although airflow was noted, the entrance was too small, with most of it plugged by rocks with a layer of soil above.

The cave was explored on 5 March 1973 when the layer of soil and stones was removed, and continued on 11 March by the Speleološki klub "Željezničar", mapped by Marijan Čepelak, and again but with a 3D point cloud by a team from the Faculty of Science at the University of Zagreb in 2019–2020.

In order to combat hypothermia, wooden planks were used during the exploration of the stream, marking the first use of that technique in Yugoslavia.

The Croatian Mountain Rescue Service once used the cave for rescue training, equipping it with many double anchors. Since then, it has been used to train new cavers, as well as for recreational caving by cavers from Zagreb.

Further exploration was carried out in September 2018 but the results remain unpublished.

== Climatology ==
The average temperature in the cave is 10.1 °C (50.2 °F), with a relative humidity of 95%. No measurable airflow has been detected.

The maximum radon concentration is about 4000 Bq/m^{3} and likely even higher in the summer, due to poor ventilation. This concentration is over the danger threshold for longer visits.

== Geology ==
Velebitaška jama formed in Upper Tortonian layers of organogenic and bioclastic limestone, sandstone, and lime and clay marlstone.

It formed away from fault lines.

The cave is covered in places with speleothems and layers of mud in the hydrologically active parts, but is not as decorated as some other nearby caves. There are both stalactites and stalagmites.

== See also ==
- List of caves on Zagrebačka gora
