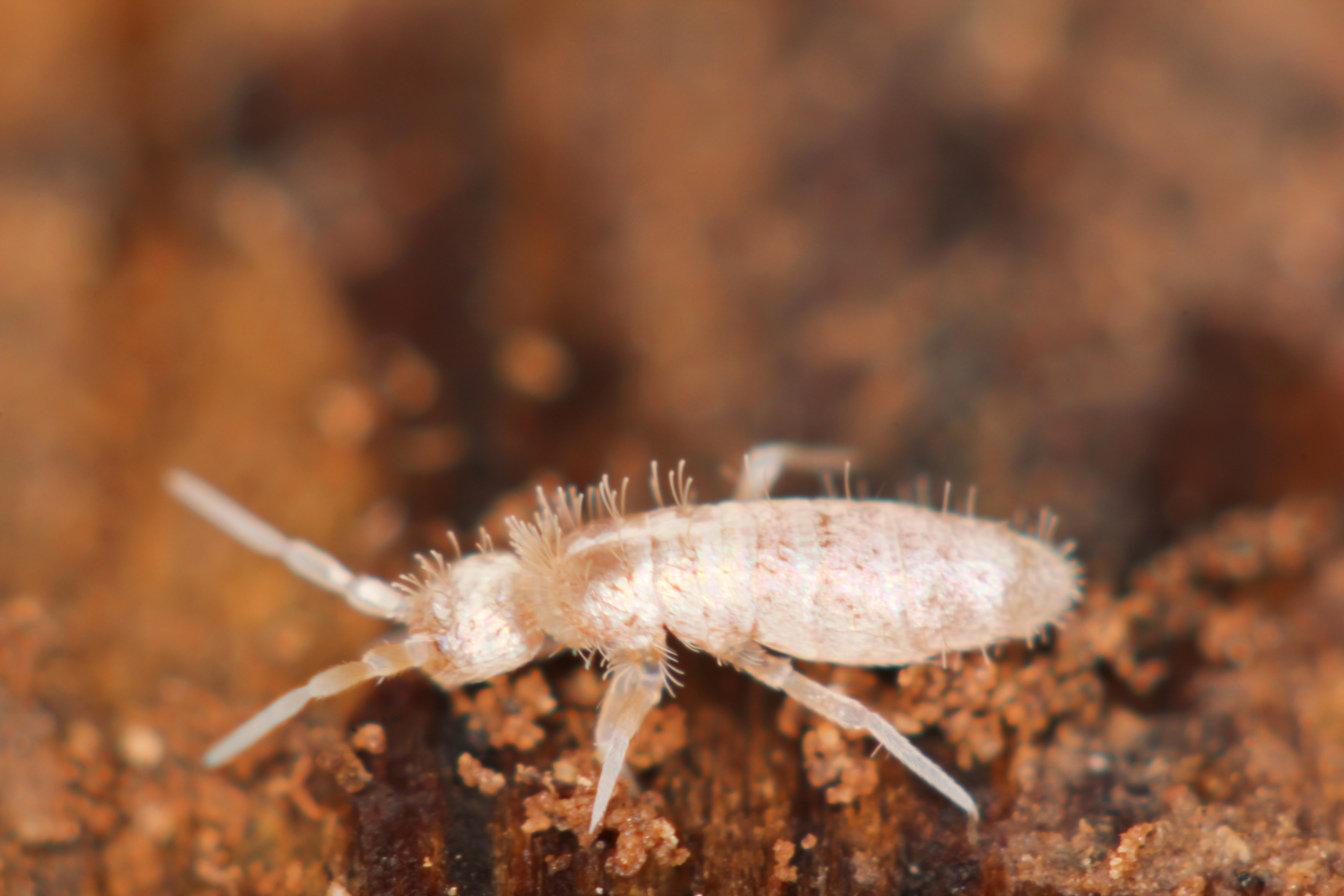
- Heteromurus nitidus

Scientific classification
- Domain: Eukaryota
- Kingdom: Animalia
- Phylum: Arthropoda
- Class: Collembola
- Order: Entomobryomorpha
- Family: Entomobryidae
- Subfamily: Orchesellinae
- Genus: Heteromurus; Wankel, 1860

Synonyms
- Heteromurodes Absolon, 1901

= Heteromurus =

Genus of springtails

Heteromurus is a genus of slender springtails in the family Entomobryidae. There are at least three described species in Heteromurus.

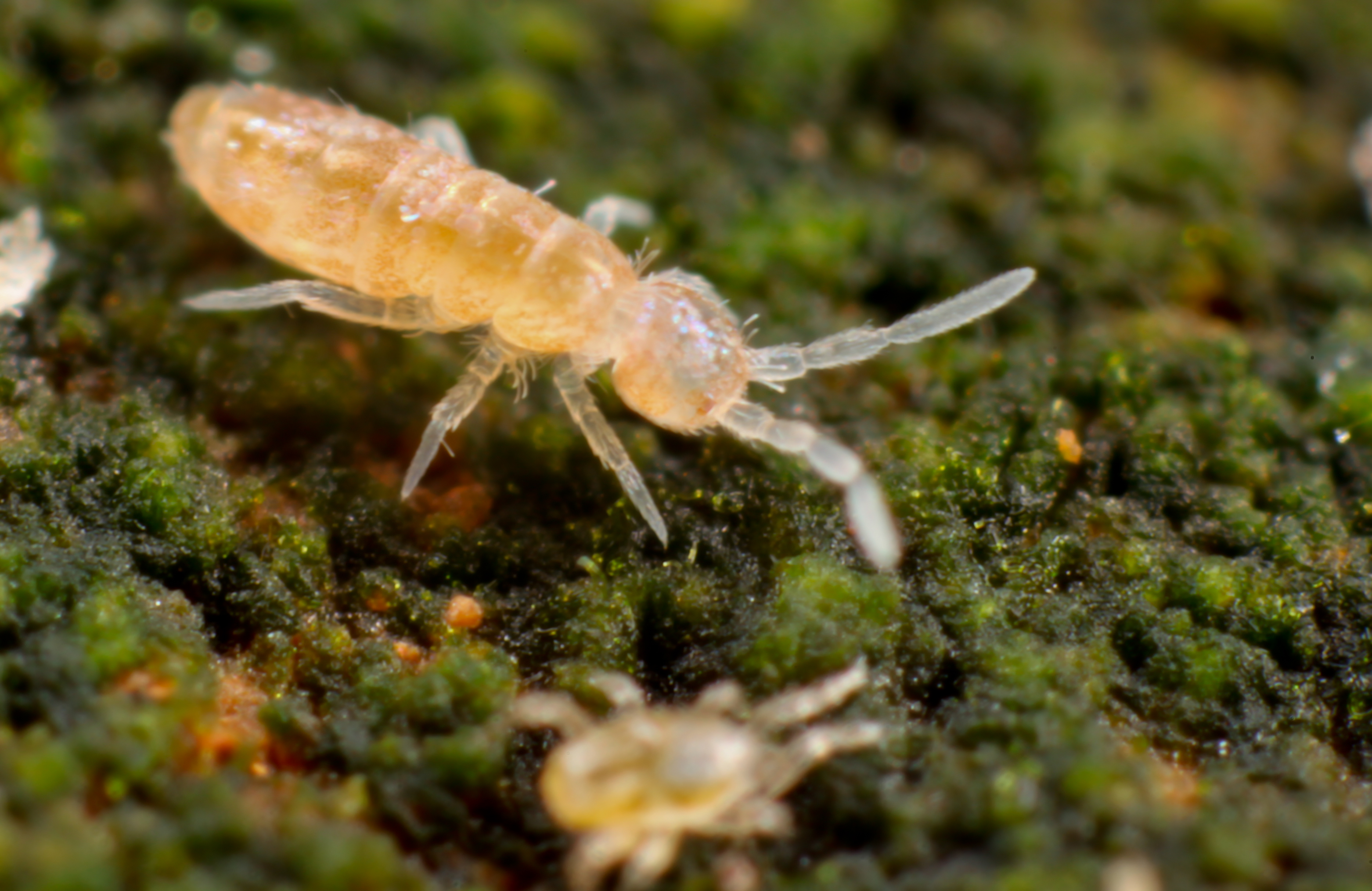
Heteromurus nitidus

== Species ==
- Heteromurus margaritarius Wankel, 1860
- Heteromurus nitidus (Templeton, 1835)
- Heteromurus tenuicornis Borner, 1906
