= List of caves on Zagrebačka gora =

This is a list of caves on the Zagrebačka gora massif. As of 2011, 64 speleological objects are known to be on Medvednica. The first author to compose a list of caves on this massif was Dragutin Hirc in 1905, but although the list grew with the work of Josip Poljak and others before the advent of modern cave exploration, the first comprehensive list of caves on the massif to take advantage of speleological discoveries did not come until Božičević's Podzemni krški fenomeni planine Medvednice kraj Zagreba was published in 1975. Since then, there have been several updates, the most current being the Katastar speleoloških objekata Republike Hrvatske, closed to the public but with excerpts available at Bioportal.

Names	Depth	Length	State	Number	Elevation	Coordinates	Sources
Bajt I (Note: Bajt 1, Ponor na Bajtu)						45.906394°N 16.020081°E	
Bajt II (Note: Bajt 2)							
Banova pećina						(Note: On the opposite side of the valley from the larger Komušareva pećina.)	(Note: ˙)
Bijele sige jama	27	95	(Note: "U cilju zaštite speleoloških objekata ili njihovih dijelova od Ministarstva je potrebno ishoditi dopuštenje za posjećivanje, korištenje ili uređenje speleološkog objekta ili njegovoga dijela." [In order to protect speleological objects or their parts, it is necessary to seek a permit from the Ministry for the visiting of, use of or arrangement of a speleological object or its part.])	HR00513	534	45.855153°N 15.863263°E	
Bizek II		21.5	Damaged or destroyed.				
Bizek V	4.5	4.5	(Note: "Speleološki objekti su prirodno formirani podzemni prostori duži od pet metara u koje može ući čovjek, a dimenzije ulaza su im manje od dubine ili dužine objekta (špilje, jame, ponori, estavele i dr.)." [Speleological objects are naturally formed subterranean spaces longer than 5 m into which a human can enter, and with entrance dimensions smaller than the depth or length of the object.]˙)				
Bizek VI	1	5	No certification required. Damaged or destroyed.				
Družanica I (Note: Družanice I)	0	6.5	(Note: Entry to main chamber permitted during inclimate weather.)		440	45.850305°N 15.869142°E	(Note: ˙˙˙˙˙˙)
Družanica II (Note: Družanice II)		6					(Note: ˙˙˙)
Dvogača (Note: Dvogaća)	9	11	Caving certification required.	HR00514		45.850768°N 15.873148°E	
Gužva jama							
Ivina jama, Medvednica	19			HR00519			
Izvor špilja kod Starog grada Zeline (Note: Vilina jama)		5	Caution! Potable water supply.			45.980955°N 16.194639°E	(Note: ˙˙˙)
Jama kod Hrastine						45.834542°N 15.846858°E	
Jama kod Kamenih Svatova							
Jama kod Marije Snježne	10						
Jama na livadi	11		Caving certification required.			(Note: Kod kamenoloma Dolje.)	
Jama na ulazu u Kamenolom Dolje							
Jama na Zlatinice brijegu (Note: Jama na Zatinica brijegu)	10						(Note: ˙˙)
Jama ispod Planinarskog doma Dolje	24		Caving certification required. Damaged or destroyed.				
Jama iznad Kamenoloma Dolje	10?		Caving certification required.				
Jama u Borčecu	4	25					
Jama u Kamenolomu Bizek	24						
Jama u stijeni	11		Caving certification required.				
Jamasta pećina						(Note: Iznad puta do Kamenih svatova.)	
Jambrišakov ponor 1					465	45.854180°N 15.883328°E	
Jambrišakov ponor 2					464	45.853156°N 15.882013°E	
Jambrišakovo vrelo	0.2	6.2	(Note: "U cilju zaštite speleoloških objekata ili njihovih dijelova od Ministarstva je potrebno ishoditi dopuštenje za ronjenje u speleološkom objektu." [In order to protect speleological objects or their parts, it is necessary to seek a permit from the Ministry for diving in a speleological object.])	HR04391	486	45.859014°N 15.882128°E	(Note: ˙˙˙˙˙˙˙˙˙˙˙˙˙˙˙˙˙˙˙˙˙˙˙˙˙)
Javornica kod Bizeka	28	330	Damaged or destroyed.		306	(Note: "Idući od vrela potoka Dolje prema uvali Križevščak, naišli su uz put na malu rupu u tlu.")	(Note: ˙˙˙˙˙˙˙˙)
Kaverna u bunaru (Note: Špilja u bunaru)	6.5	18	Gated.			(Note: Borčec)	
Kolarska gora jama	9		Caving certification required. Human remains.			(Note: Borčec)	(Note: ˙˙)
Kolarska gora I	3	10.5	Caving certification required.				
Kolarska gora IV	7	7.9	Caving certification required.				
Kolarska gora VI	3	5					
Konjska peć (Note: Pećina Konj, Komušareva pećina, Komušarova pećina, Pećina Pečovje)			No certification required.			45.908756°N 16.029844°E	
Kosićev ponor	18.5		Closed to the public.			45.835763°N 15.846355°E	(Note: ˙˙˙˙˙˙˙˙˙)
Krušna peć pod Pečovjem			No certification required.			45.906°N 16.025°E	
Kustošijanka		44.7			155	45.818850°N 15.922650°E	
Lisičja rupa		7				(Note: Obronci potoka Bidrovec)	
Mačja peć			No certification required.				
Mala peć na Rogu							
Mala Veternica	3	15		HR03274			
Medvednica mala (Note: Mala Medvednica, Mala pećina)	6	9				45.918790°N 15.962877°E	(Note: ˙˙˙˙˙˙˙˙˙˙˙˙˙˙˙˙˙˙˙˙˙˙˙)
Medveđa skruta (Note: Medvjeđa skuta)						45.906°N 16.021°E	
Meina jama	15		Caving certification required.	HR00518			
Mistique	24	29	Caving certification required.	HR01669	479	45.84617°N 15.86907°E	(Note: ˙˙)
Oštrčka pećina (Note: Oštrečka pećina)						(Note: Na vrhu Oštrca/Oštreca na istočnoj strani Medvednice)	
Patuljkova špiljica (Note: Patuljasta špilja)		5	No certification required.			45.919005°N 15.964641°E	(Note: ˙˙˙˙˙˙˙˙˙˙˙˙˙˙˙)
Pecara		6					(Note: ˙˙)
Kolarska pećina (Note: Pećina Kolarska gora, Pećina na Kolarskoj gori, Kolarska gora špilja)		32				(Note: Above Borčec)	(Note: ˙˙˙)
Pećina iznad Križevščaka (Note: Pećina iznad Križevčaka, Špilja iznad Križevčaka)		29				45.842742°N 15.856933°E	(Note: ˙˙˙˙˙˙)
Pećina Svetog Martina			Damaged or destroyed.			45.822269°N 15.832845°E	(Note: ˙˙ (Note: "U Podsusedu bijaše tik kapelice sv. Martina ogromna špilja, koju su u najnovije doba prahom i dinamitom razorili i kamenje joj kojekuda razvezli. U ovoj špilji da je živio pustinjak sv. Martin. U toj špilji bijaše g. 1287. i oltar posvećen blaženomu Martinu, o kojemu ima vijest i iz g. 1209." [in Podsused there was, next to the Chapel of Saint Martin, an enormous cave, which they in most recent times with powder or dinamite destroyed and her stones somewhere carted off. In this cave lived, it is said, the hermit saint Martin. In that cave in the year 1287 an altar was consecrated to the blessed Martin, about which there is a report from the year 1209.])˙)
Petnajstica (Note: Petnaestica)	15		Caving certification required.				(Note: ˙˙)
Podkamena	7.5		Caving certification required.				
Podsvinjarčica (Note: Podcintarnica, Podcitarnica, Polušpilja pod Svinjačom, Partizanska pećina)		6.5	No certification required.		439	45.850467°N 15.887167°E	(Note: ˙˙˙˙˙˙˙˙˙˙˙˙˙)
Poivca ponor						45.863116°N 15.844772°E	
Polušpilja nasuprot Šupljastoj pećini						45.8826°N 15.9969°E	(Note: Photos: 1, 2)
Polušpilja Pod slojem	1.5	5	No certification required.		430	45.848108°N 15.875412°E	(Note: ˙˙˙˙˙˙˙)
Ponikva 3, Jezeranec					470	45.853361°N 15.878392°E	
Ponor Jezeranca (Note: Ponor potoka Jezeranec, Ponor Ježeranca)					469	45.851859°N 15.880031°E	(Note: ˙˙˙˙˙˙˙˙˙)
Ponor na Tepčinoj špici (Note: Ponor "Tepči")	4	7					(Note: ˙˙˙˙˙˙)
Ponor u Mikulić selu			Damaged or destroyed.			unknown	
Ponor u potoku Bistri Jarek							
Ponor u potoku Jelenja voda (Note: Ponor u potoku Jelenje vode, Ponor u potoku Jelena voda)	2	2+	No certification required.				(Note: ˙˙˙˙˙)
Školska jama, Medvednica	30		Caving certification required.	HR00517			
Špilja kod Mikulića							
Špilja pored Žrvene peći male (Note: Špiljica bez imena (1996))		5	No certification required.			(Note: 20 m from Pecara and 20 m from Mala Žrvena peć.)	(Note: ˙)
Špilja u potoku	6.2	3.6		HR04941		45.94°N 16.05°E	
Štagelj (Note: Štagalj)						45.907°N 16.023°E	
Šumarev grob (Note: Polušpilja Šumarev grob)						45.90150°N 15.96694°E	(Note: Photos: 1, 2)
Šupljasta pećina (Note: Šupljasta peć, Markuševečka pećina, Markuševačka peć, Špilja kod Markuševca, Pećina u Markuševcu, Šimunska spilja)		7				45.88283°N 15.99663°E	(Note: ˙˙˙˙˙˙˙˙˙˙˙˙˙˙˙˙˙˙˙˙˙)
Talijanova pećina (Note: Pećina uz Vrapče potok)							(Note: ˙)
Tisin ponor I (Note: Tisov ponor, Tisina jama)	12	25	Closed to the public. Buried. Danger! Waste.			45.918901°N 15.963507°E	(Note: ˙˙˙˙˙˙˙˙˙˙˙˙˙˙˙˙˙˙˙˙˙˙˙˙˙˙˙˙˙˙˙˙˙˙˙˙˙)
Tisin ponor II (Note: Ponor II na Horvatovim stubama)	4	4	No certification required.			45.918838°N 15.963559°E	(Note: ˙˙˙˙˙˙˙˙˙˙˙˙˙˙˙)
Tisin ponor III (Note: Ponor III na Horvatovim stubama, Treći ponor)	10.5	10.5				(Note: Across the Bistri jarek stream from the Medvednica cave.)	(Note: ˙˙˙˙˙˙˙˙˙˙˙˙˙˙)
Tisin ponor IV	7	7					(Note: ˙˙)
Tisin ponor V		10				(Note: Near Orlove stijene.)	
Tisin ponor VI (Note: Ponor u koritu Bistrog Jarka, Ponor u koritu Špiljskog potoka)						(Note: 500 m from the Izletište "Srnec" near Horvatove stube)	
Tortača jama	26		Caving certification required.				
Tvrdoglavka jama	13.5		Caving certification required.				
Udmanićeva pećina (Note: Udmanićeva špilja, Špilja Medvednica)	8	32	No certification required.			45.918513°N 15.963240°E	(Note: ˙˙˙˙˙˙˙˙˙˙˙˙˙˙˙˙˙˙˙˙˙˙˙˙˙˙˙˙˙˙˙˙˙˙˙˙˙˙˙˙˙˙˙˙˙˙˙)
Urušena špilja kod doline Orešja							
Uska pećina na Rogu (Note: Uska špilja na Rogu)		20					(Note: ˙˙˙˙˙)
Uska jama (Note: (kod kamenoloma Dolje))	25		Caving certification required.				
Velebitaška jama (Note: Batinova jama, Jama na Jazbinjaku)	45	70	Caving certification required. Closed to the public.	HR01426	417	45.845957°N 15.868496°E	(Note: ˙˙˙˙˙˙˙˙˙)
Velika peć na Rogu (Note: Velika peć na Lipi, Velika peč, Topla špilja)	0	35	Caving certification required. Closed to the public.	HR02303	675.5	45.937560°N 16.062021°E	(Note: ˙˙˙˙˙˙˙˙˙˙˙˙˙˙˙˙˙˙˙˙˙˙˙˙˙˙˙˙˙˙˙˙˙˙˙˙˙˙˙˙˙˙˙˙˙˙˙)
Veternica	50	7128	Gated. Guided tour cave.	HR00118	306	45.841058°N 15.873642°E	(Note: Veternica bibliography; ˙˙˙˙˙˙˙˙˙˙˙˙˙˙˙˙˙˙˙˙˙˙˙˙˙˙˙˙˙˙˙˙˙˙˙˙˙˙˙˙˙˙˙˙˙˙˙˙˙˙˙˙˙˙˙˙˙˙˙˙˙˙˙˙˙˙˙˙˙˙˙˙˙˙˙˙˙˙˙˙˙˙˙˙˙˙˙˙˙˙˙˙˙˙˙˙˙˙˙˙˙˙˙˙˙˙˙˙˙˙˙˙˙˙˙˙˙˙˙˙˙˙˙˙˙˙˙˙˙)
Vitelničke pećine						45.920038°N 16.038386°E	(Note: ˙˙)
Vrapčanka	39	44	Caving certification required. Danger! Explosive waste.	HR01427		45.847667°N 15.893635°E	(Note: ˙˙˙˙˙˙˙˙)
Vražja jama	11		Caving certification required.	HR00520			(Note: ˙)
Vražje ždrijelo (Note: Jama kod Kaptolske lugarnice)	31.5	35.4	Caving certification required.	HR01479		45.926488°N 16.027064°E	(Note: ˙˙˙˙˙˙˙˙˙˙˙˙˙˙˙˙˙˙˙)
Vučje jame							(Note: ˙˙˙)
Žabljakuša	11	12	Caving certification required.		412	45.845189°N 15.863265°E	(Note: ˙)
Zakičnica I (Note: Zakićnica I)	6	25	Caving certification required.		469	45.848921°N 15.867806°E	(Note: ˙˙˙˙)
Zakičnica II (Note: Zakićnica II)	7	10	Caving certification required.				
Zakičnica III (Note: Zakićnica III)	9		Caving certification required.			45.843440°N 15.869156°E	(Note: ˙˙˙˙)
Zakičnica IV (Note: Zakićnica IV)	6		Caving certification required.		439	45.845193°N 15.863986°E	(Note: ˙˙˙˙˙)
Zakičnica V (Note: Zakićnica V)	23	23	Caving certification required.	HR02826	410	45.842071°N 15.865695°E	(Note: ˙˙˙˙˙)
Zakičnica VI (Note: Zakićnica VI)	29	90	Caving certification required.		460	45.844735°N 15.867403°E	(Note: ˙˙˙˙˙)
Zakičnica VII (Note: Zakićnica VII)	28	44	Caving certification required.	HR02822	401	45.845472°N 15.862451°E	(Note: ˙˙˙˙˙˙)
Zakičnica VIII (Note: Zakićnica VIII)	5		Caving certification required.				
Zakičnica IX (Note: Zakićnica IX)	5.3	6.5	Caving certification required.	HR02825		45.849049°N 15.858405°E	(Note: ˙˙˙)
Zakičnica XI (Note: Zakićnica XI)	/					45.849613°N 15.870760°E	
Zidana peć		25					
Židovske jame	1.8	95.8	Danger! Waste.	HR01486		45.997484°N 16.038982°E	(Note: ˙˙˙˙˙˙˙˙˙˙˙˙˙˙˙˙˙˙˙˙˙˙˙˙˙˙˙˙)
Žrvena peć mala (Note: Žrvnjeva peć mala)		18				(Note: Dubravica)	(Note: ˙˙˙˙˙˙˙)
Žrvena peć velika (Note: Žrvnjeva peć velika)	4	44	Buried. Danger! Waste.		350	45.839974°N 15.870392°E	(Note: ˙˙˙˙˙˙˙˙˙˙˙˙˙˙˙˙˙˙˙˙˙˙˙˙˙˙˙˙˙˙˙)
Žuranščak (Note: Žurenščak, Žurenšćak, Žuranšćak, Žurinščak, Zuranjšćak, Đurajnščak, Đurenšćak, Gjurenšćak, Bizečka pećina, Bizečka špilja, Bužinščak, Izvir)	20	90	Buried. Danger! Waste.			45.830113°N 15.859267°E	(Note: ˙˙˙˙˙˙˙˙˙˙˙˙˙˙˙˙˙˙˙˙˙˙˙˙˙˙˙˙˙˙˙˙˙˙˙˙˙˙˙˙˙)
Zvoneća jama (Note: Jama Zatinica brijeg)	12		Caving certification required.			(Note: On Zlatnice brijeg / Zlatinice.)	(Note: ˙˙˙˙˙)

== See also ==
- List of Dinaric caves

== Notes ==
=== Legend ===
Dry cave (Note: Rarely flooded.)	Partly wet cave (Note: At least one entrance dry but at least one passage with flowing water.)	Wet cave (Note: At least one entrance rarely dry.)	Submerged cave (Note: Rarely exposed.)	Cave with complex hydrological regime (Note: For example with seasonal variation.)
