= Bijele sige =

Cave on Mount Medvednica

- Location within Croatia
- Interactive map of Bijele sige
- Location: Medvednica
- Coordinates: 45.855153°N 15.863263°E
- Depth: 27 metres (89 ft)
- Length: 95 metres (0.059 mi)
- Elevation: 534 metres (1,752 ft)
- Geology: Karst cave
- Entrances: 1
- Hazards: flooding
- Cadastral code: HR00513

Bijele sige, also known as Bjele sige jama and Jama bijele sige, is a 27 m deep pit cave with horizontal extensions on the Medvednica massif in Croatia. It is located in an area with many pit caves, but is one of the largest among these, and is distinguished by complex horizontal passages, which bring the total length of the cave to 94 m. The cave is under special protection, and is closed to the public.

== Description ==
The entrance to the cave is at 534 m above sea level, and its deepest point at 507 m above sea level. The entrance is narrow, at only 1.5×0.6 m, widening after 2 m until it becomes a chamber by the end of the 10 m drop.

The entrance chamber has a mound of soil, branches, and leaves at the bottom and extends both to the northeast and to the west consisting.

To the northeast, the passage leads to a chamber with a small drop and smaller chimney above. This turns south and ends in narrow, impassable canal.

To the west, there is a side-passage to a pit with about 15 m of vertical elevation difference, most of which below the entrance to the pit.

== History ==
The cave was explored and mapped on 18 May 1996 by the Speleološki klub "Željezničar", and again but with a 3D point cloud by a team from the Faculty of Science at the University of Zagreb in 2019–2020.

Being near the city of Zagreb, the cave has been used for the training of vertical cavers in Single-rope technique, including on 7 November 1998, and again in the spring of 2000.

== Climatology ==
The average temperature in the cave is 9.8 °C (49.6 °F), with a relative humidity of 95% outside of the entrance chamber. No measurable airflow has been detected.

The maximum radon concentration is about 800 Bq/m^{3}, which is much lower than some nearby caves.

== Geology ==
Bijele sige formed in Middle Triassic layers. including limestone, marlstone, chert, tufa, and tufite.

It formed away from fault lines and above the local erosional base as the result of denudation. It is under mainly hydrological conditions, as a vadose feature, although the cave is no longer hydrologically active today except through seepage. But two crevice systems are found in the cave: one 60-240° followed by the canal beneath the entrance, and one 10-190°. Both of these are nearly vertical. This has resulted in much of the cave having a triangular cross-section with a floor covered in eroded stones.

The cave is decorated with speleothems, in places as thick as 3 cm, including stalactites, stalagmites, pillars, curtains, toothed curtains, cave pearls, tubular straws, moonmilk, cave popcorn, and other concretions. The decorations are so pervasive that they obscure the stratigraphy of the cave.

== Fauna ==
The woodlouse Mesoniscus graniger has been recorded in the cave.

== See also ==
- List of caves on Zagrebačka gora
