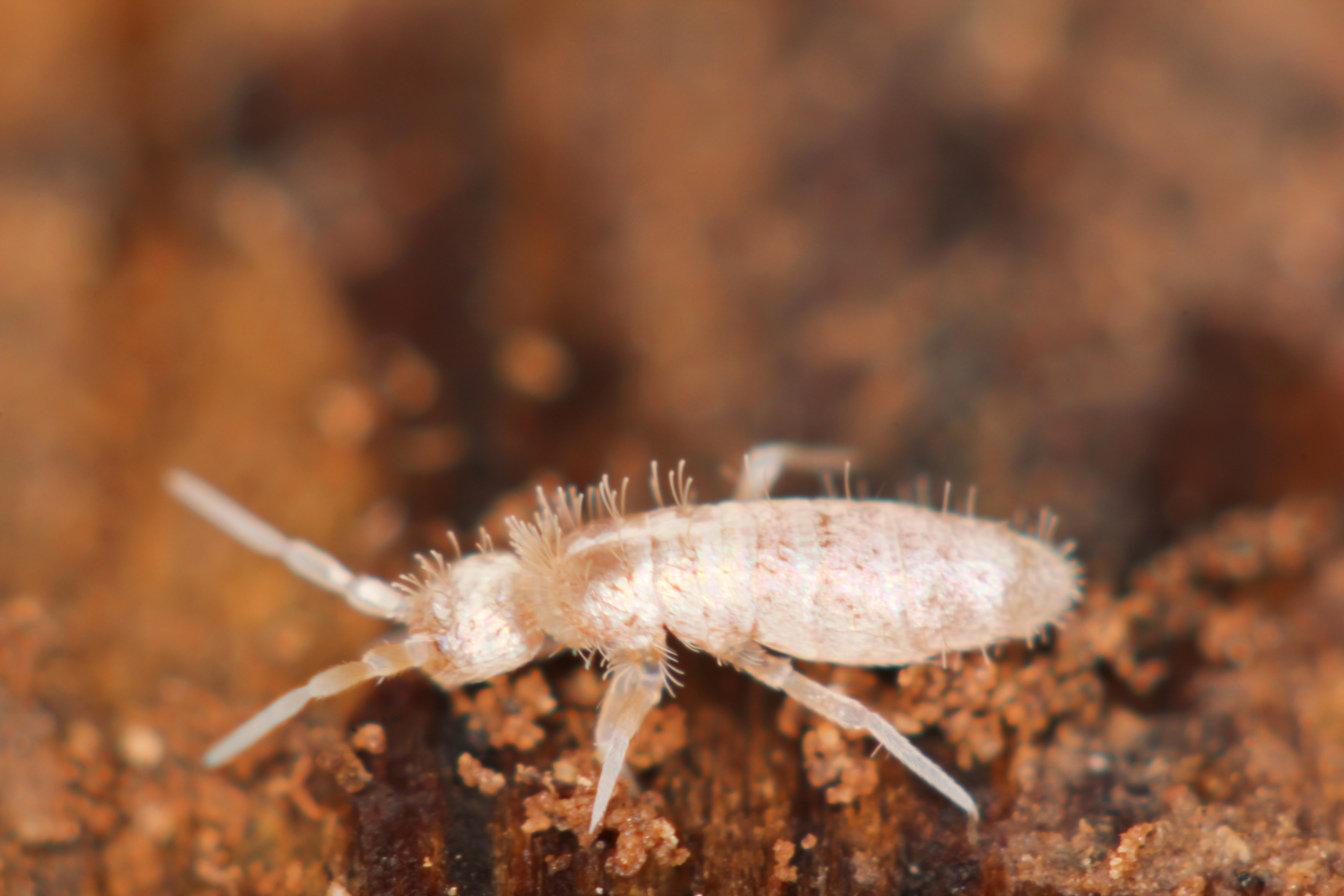

Scientific classification
- Kingdom: Animalia
- Phylum: Arthropoda
- Class: Collembola
- Order: Entomobryomorpha
- Family: Entomobryidae
- Genus: Heteromurus
- Species: H. nitidus

Binomial name
- Heteromurus nitidus (Templeton, 1835)

Synonyms
- Heteromurus americana Harvey, 1892; Heteromurus nitidus quadriocellata Kseneman Of Maynard, 1951; Heteromurus quadrioculata Schott, 1896; Podura nitidus Templeton, 1835

= Heteromurus nitidus =

Species of springtail

Heteromurus nitidus is a species of slender springtails in the family Entomobryidae. This species possess a serie of easily removable scales on its back, that serve as a mean of defence. While captured by beetle scales stick to predator's mouthparts and detach enabling the springtail to run away.

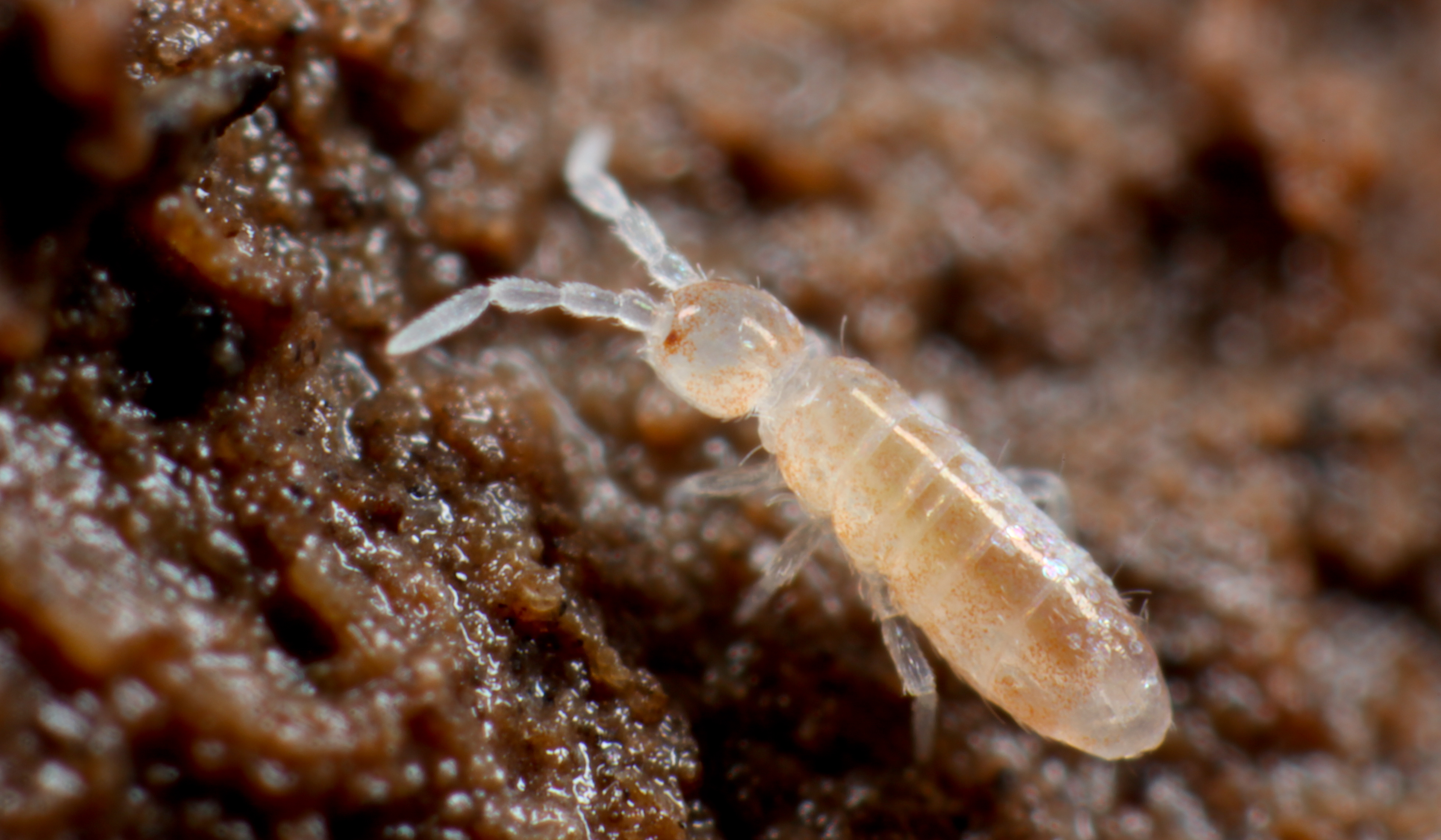

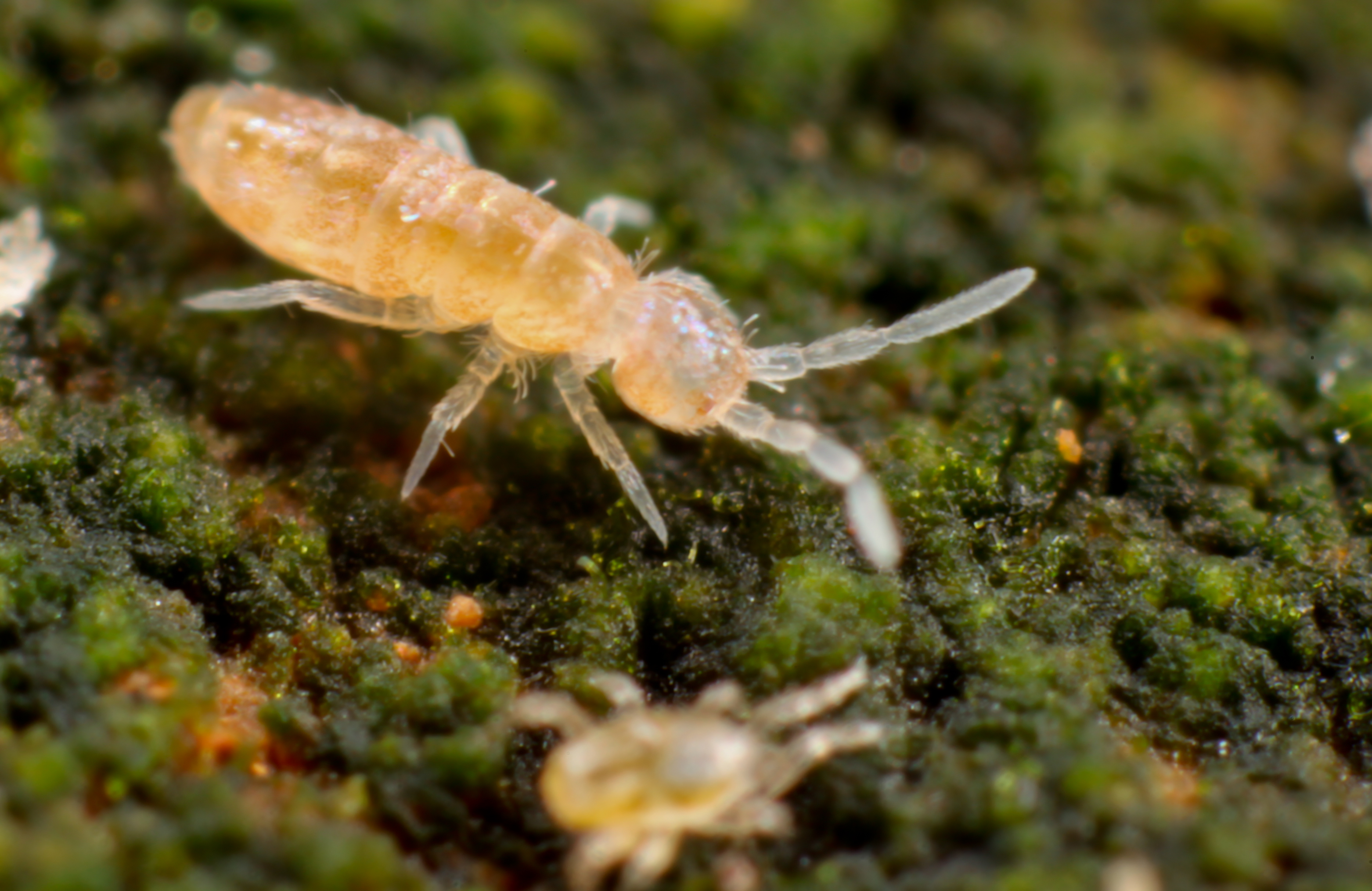
