= Veternica (cave) =

Cave in Croatia

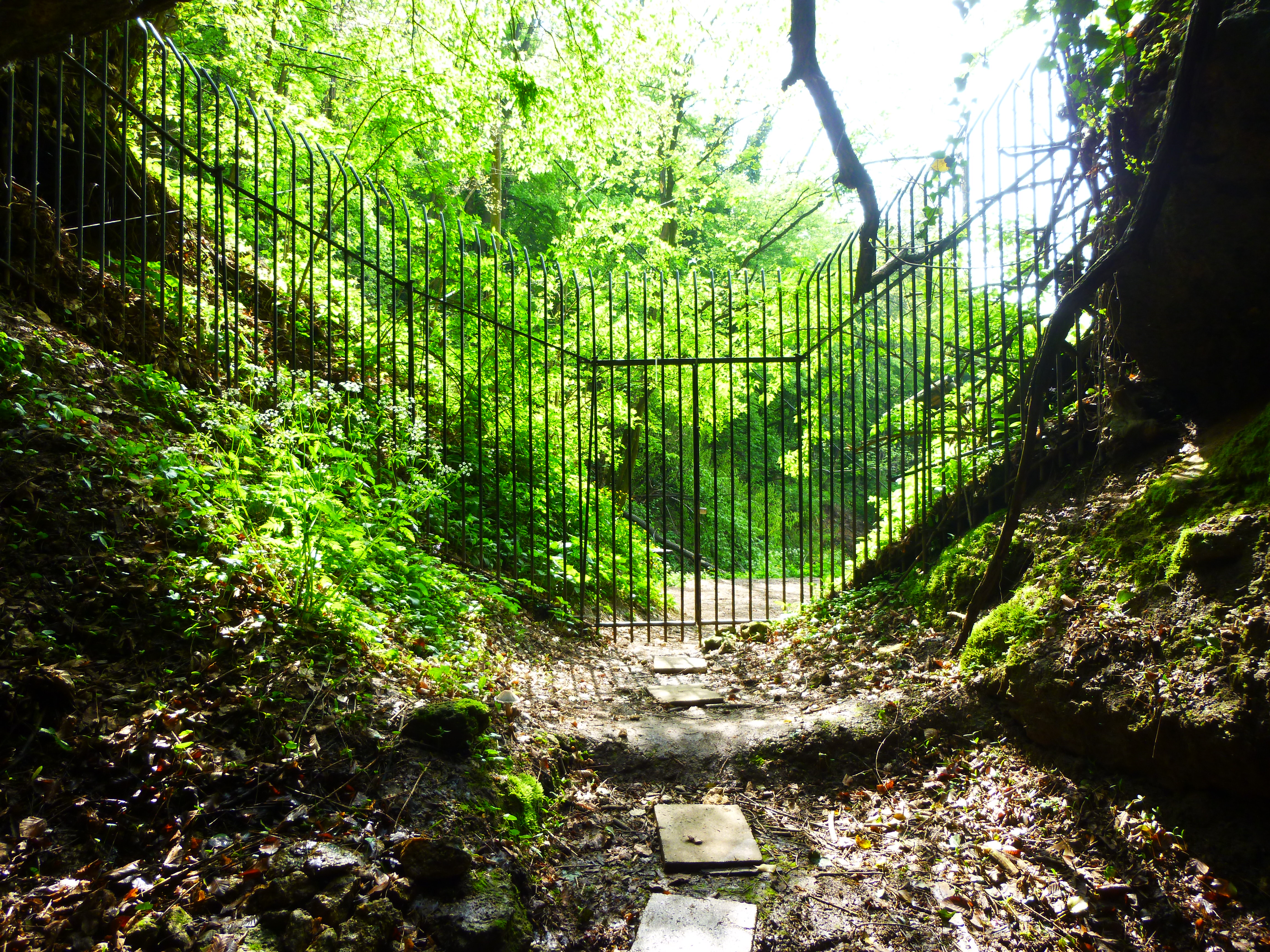
- View from entrance

- Location within Croatia
- Interactive map of Veternica
- Location: Zagreb
- Coordinates: 45.841058°N 15.873642°E
- Depth: 50 metres (160 ft)
- Length: 7,128 metres (4.429 mi)
- Elevation: 306 metres (1,004 ft)
- Geology: Karst cave
- Access: Tours available (April – November)
- Show cave length: 380 metres (1,250 ft)
- Lighting: Yes
- Cadastral code: HR00118

Veternica is a cave located on Medvednica mountain in Zagreb, Croatia. At 7,128 metres (23,386 ft) long, with a depth of 50 metres (160 ft) and a vertical difference over 200 metres (660 ft), it is the longest known cave on its massif, and an estimated 6 km or more remain unexplored. In the 1960s, it briefly became the longest cave in Croatia. The first 380 m (1,250 ft) is available to visitors. In 2019, it had 5787 visitors. It is an archeological site where remains of several kinds of prehistoric animals as well as humans have been found. The cave has been protected by law since 7 July 1979, with registration as a Natural Monument on 11 July of that year.

== Etymology ==
The name Vetrenica is a Kajkavian -en-adjective formed from the reflex of Proto-Slavic větrъ "wind", to which the denominal suffix -ica has been added. It is named for the wind that comes from the lower entrance of a cave as a result of temperature differences, except in the winter. Specifically in caves with two or more entrances and a significant difference in elevation between them. The upper entrance in this case seems to be a pit cave discovered in 1973 and named Dvogača, which sucks in warm external air in summer but emits relatively warm internal air in winter, opposite of Vetrenica.

== Description ==
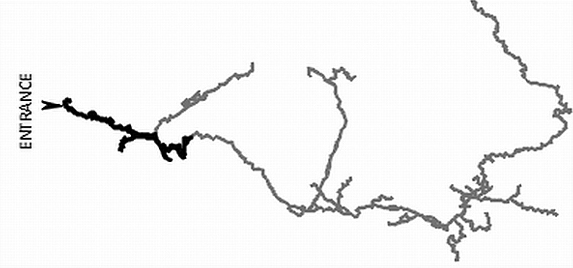
Map adapted from Čepelak 1979

Detailed descriptions of the cave itself can be found in Poljak 1934, Baučić 1945, Božičević 1960, Čepelak 1977, Čepelak 1979 and other sources.

The entrance is permanently dry, but Kramberger's guide relayed an account related to him by the father of his paternal uncle, the 60 year old Zolak Nacek, that Veternica had once flooded for 24 hours. In 2004, caver Vlado Božić proposed that the entrance to the cave had been completely covered before this flood, which created the initial opening. This was dismissed by geologists Srećko Božičević and Mladen Garašić as a "fantasy", but defended by geologist Hrvoje Malinar, who took Božić to evaluate the hypothesis in the cave on October 8th, finding multiple traces of an older flood in the main canal from the entrance to the stream, in addition to traces of high water level in the deeper parts of the cave where such levels had not been observed.

The wet part of the cave includes 14 active streams. Among other sources, these streams come from 9 known ponors, including 2 at Ponikve polje. The cave branches stretch towards these sinkholes, while the main channel runs 1250 m NNW towards Ponikve.

In 1960, Božičević divided the cave into four sections:

1. The entrance itself with entrance chamber, in which the anthropological finds were made.
2. The tourist section, ending 380 m from the entrance at Kalvarija, beyond which the original explorer Gršetić did not reach. Because this part and the first part of Majmunski prolaz formed underneath the level of the paleolake, in the phreatic zone, these passages are relatively wide and easy. Individual chambers are named, such as the Koncertna dvorana.
  1. The 1st branch from the entrance is the vadose Ponor 16 metara with 68.5 m of passage, carrying the cave to its deepest known point only 75 m above the elevation of the Dubravica spring. It is a potential path to reaching the current phreatic zone, whose source is the Glavni siphon and exit the Dubravica spring, but high CO_{2} concentrations of unknown persistence may create safety issues.
  2. The 2nd branch is the Velebitaški kanal (Note: Kanal iznad Kamenog slapa) with 730.5 m, opposite the Ponor 16 metara, mostly horizontal but with a deep vadose descent in the Velebitaški siphon. It extends towards the Družanica hill on the surface. The Velebitaški kanal is a narrow, canyon-type channel.
  3. The 3rd branch is the Separe appendix with 35 m. Within it is the chamber Trbušasta dvorana.
3. Majmunski prolaz stretches from about 400 m to 900 m, exposed to geologically younger phenomena. It is narrower, with a gradually lower roof, and split into two levels at three discontinuous sections, the last of which is Ramzesovo šetalište-Pakao.
  1. The 4th/5th branch is the Pakleni kanal with 563.5 m, extending towards Družanica from the junction between Ramzesovo šetalište and Pakao. It is even more difficult to traverse than the Velebitski kanal, because in addition to the narrow and wet passages it abounds with drops.
  2. The 5th/4th branch is the Fosilna dvorana with the Kukušni vadose siphon, together with 88 m, entered at Pakao. It has a stream, and is a potential path to reaching the current phreatic zone.
  3. The 6th branch is the Kanal iznad Limunove dvorane with 85 m, extending towards Družanica, entered from a Pakao chamber known as Limunova dvorana. A mostly narrow but relatively horizontal passage, apart from the Bubrezi section.
4. The hydrologically active section beyond that. Its main passage is the largest on average.
  1. The 7th branch is the Glavni siphon, which receives most of the water from the sections deeper in.
  2. The 8th branch is the Stari kanal with 85 m. It is wider and easier to pass.
  3. "New Veternica" (Note: Nova Veternica) with 453 m, a complex network of exceptional beauty as with Kristalni kanal and Dvorana kipova. It includes the Velika dvorana, one of the largest chambers in the cave, and the Kanal slapova with 9 waterfalls, though the tallest waterfall in New Veternica at 13 m is in the Vjetrova dvorana chamber.
  4. Alpinistički kanal with 531 m. Entered through the roof of the Tamna dvorana chamber, the 2nd largest chamber in the cave. It includes several chambers with abundant calcite decorations: Dvorana sa zidom, Lijepa dvorana, Kapelica.
  5. Aneks. Connects the Tamna dvorana to the Alpinistički kanal.
  6. Darijev kanal Begins with the Bijela dvorana chamber. The channel abounds with rhomboid calcite crystal formations.
  7. Kanal iznad Razrušene dvorane.
  8. Kanal iznad Visoke dvorane.
  9. Željezničarski kanal.

== History ==
=== Discovery ===
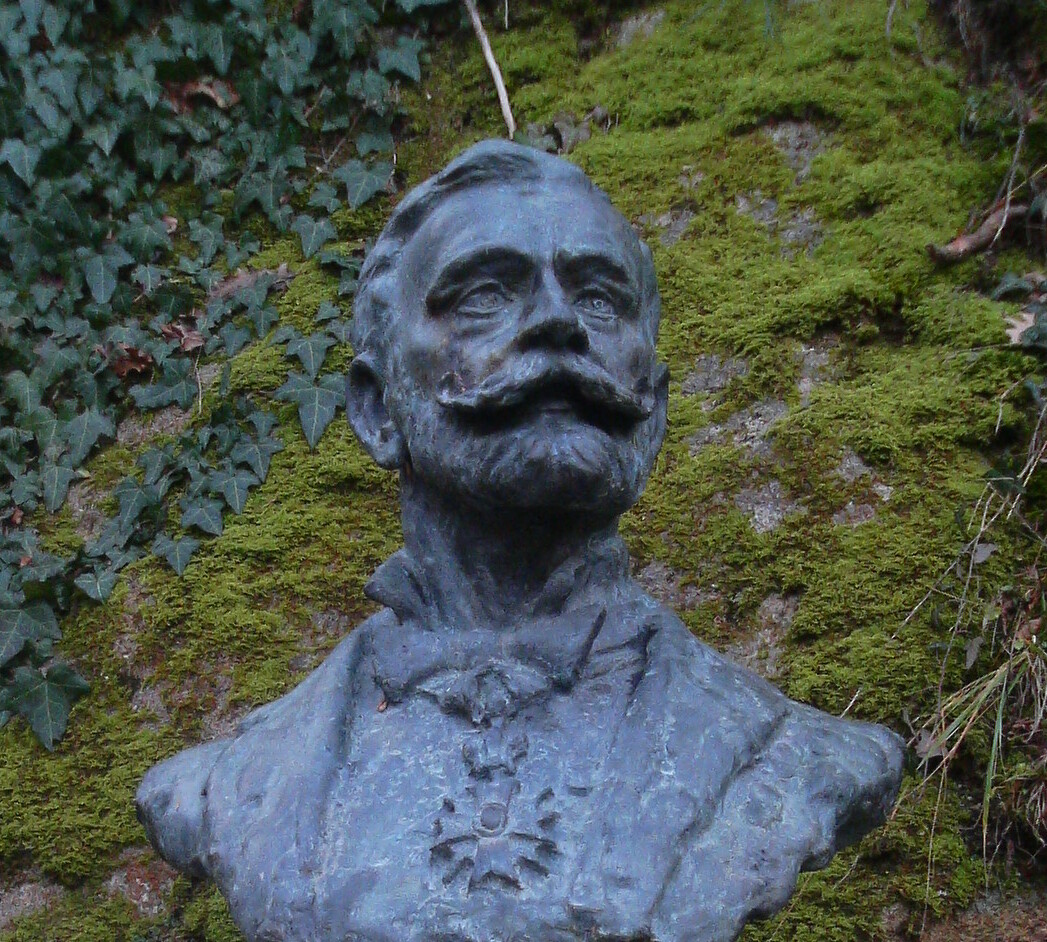
Bust of Dragutin Gorjanović -Kramberger in Krapina

The entrance to the cave was once only 45 cm wide and 29 cm high, requiring a prostrate entry; so unlike Velika peć na Rogu or the Pećina Svetog Marka, it was not mentioned in printed literature until the regional onset of speleology, beginning with the account of Dragutin Gorjanović-Kramberger in 1899. Word of the cave then spread with the works of Dragutin Hirc.

An account of the first recorded entrance into the cave in February 1933 by Stanko Gršetić with his brother and father was published on 8 March 1934 in the newspaper Večer, which popularised the cave and in the resulting exploration frenzy, the more accessible parts of the cave were quickly stripped of speleothems and the walls covered in names and dates of early explorers, as a 12 November 1934 article in Večer complained. In reaction, the Društvo za poljepšavanje Stenjevca secured the entrance and began requiring an entrance fee.

=== Early exploration ===
The first scientific exploration and mapping of the inside of the cave was made by Josip Poljak and others (Note: Slavko Hitzthaler, Dragutin Ketser, Mladen Maričić, Gvido Nonweiller, Ratimir Slavetić and Antun Takšić.) in the spring of 1934, exploring the first 1488 m of passageway, as far as the Viktorija waterfall.

Entomologist Egon Pretner visited the cave in 1936, where he found the presence of Anophthalmus kaufmanni subsp. weingaertneri.

In the light of the Bombing of Zagreb, the Ministry of War of the Independent State of Croatia had ordered late in the year to explore the possibility of repurposing the cave as a storage shelter, but nothing came of it. In 1959, Hrvoje Malinar discovered 4 hand grenades and a German novel in Fraktur type, rheumatism oil and motorist or pilot goggles, all 1200 into the cave, evidently left by a German soldier.

Although not on the maps of the time, the cave had already been explored as far as the PVC siphon by 1945.

=== Resumed mapping ===
Mirko Malez in 1976

The cave entrance had become overgrown by 1947 when exploration resumed. The first geodetic map was drawn by a team of cavers (Note: Fred Židan, Mišo Juriša, Saša Keser, "Mateljan" and "Legat".) in 1948, reaching as far as the PVC siphon and bringing the total length of the cave to just over 1590 m.

Apart from one shallow excavation by the Planinarsko društvo "Prijatelj prirode" in 1940, the cave had remained untouched by paleontologists since 1934, but in 1949 the Planinarsko društvo "Željezničar" widened the entrance and built paths for visitors of the first section of the cave, discovering alongside Roman coins and other Bronze to Iron Age artefacts the skeletal remains of five recent individuals, which archaeologist Franjo Ivanček speculated had been victims of Borčec-born marauder Mijo Brezović, who was folklorically associated with the cave.

In 1951, following years of continued devastation by speleothem-hunters, the Commission for Veternica was formed, (Note: Komisija za Veternicu. Initially consisting of Franjo Ivanček, Vladimir Mirosavljević, Mirko Malez and Slavko Marjanac.) fixing a gate to the entrance and standing guard on Sunday for several years following to permit entry to visitors who paid for entry, though the 1951 gate was destroyed in 1955, and the 1969 gate was destroyed in 1970.

Systematic excavations began, led by Franjo Ivanček and Vladimir Mirosavljević, joined by Slavko Marjanac and Mirko Malez. Around the same time, Antun Markić began systematically photographing the cave, the only previous attempts being those of Josip Poljak in his survey and of journalist Franjo Fuis published 20 April 1934 in Kulis. Concurrent with the archaeological and photographic documentation was an effort to map the entirety of the cave by Srećko Božičević and Slavko Marjanac, which by 1955 had barely progressed beyond the stream, including one expedition involving the first bivouac in the SR Croatia; it was finally finished as far as the PVC siphon at the end of 1959.

The cave was visited by French speleologist Norbert Casteret on 12 March 1955, expressing surprise that the cave had not yet been equipped with electric lighting for tourism. After receiving approval, the cavers of Planinarsko društvo "Zagreb", who had mostly transferred to the Planinarstvo društvo "Željezničar" and had begun visiting the cave almost weekly since 1950, built the first extensive paths for tourists under the leadership of professor Mirko Markulin.

In 1958, the Planinarsko Društvo "Javor" conducted a flow trace experiment at the Ponor Jezeranca, 900 m from the ponor in Veternica as the crow flies, and the fluorescein soon arrived in the Bijela dvorana of Veternica, flowing from there to the Glavni siphon and later to the Dubravica spring in the valley several hundred meters south of the entrance to Veternica. When the green dye appeared in Gornji Stenjevec, it unsettled the village, so that the trace organiser Tomica Imenšek had to spend the entire day drinking green water to show it was not toxic. A further tracer experiment was conducted under Srećko Božičević in 1969 with the same results, during which the dye took 8 hours to reach Veternica, indicating complex passages.

=== Further exploration ===
For decades, the cave remained unknown beyond the PVC siphon, but the Glavni siphon remained the most intriguing siphon. Following an 3 m dive and then on 21 June 1959 an 8 m dive by Hrvoje Malinar with a Drâger Aqua-Lung to a sandy bottom (the first freshwater cave scuba dive in SR Croatia), continued exploration was not deemed worth the risk, but Malinar had detected a narrow opening. Even with improvements in equipment, a 1988 dive by Branko Jalžić was unsuccessful in progressing past the point reached by Malinar.

With the negative results of the dive and the remaining options for continuation growing increasingly difficult, the visits to the cave for exploration purposes by the original clubs decreased, and it became mostly a training cave for young cavers. One of their last notable contributions in this period came from Vlado Božić, who finished the map to the PVC siphon in the 1960s on the basis of the work done in the previous decade. Where the Željezničari left off, the Planinarsko društvo Sveučilišta "Velebit" began. In 1962—1967, the Velebitaši under Hrvoje Malinar discovered the Velebitaški kanal, Ponor 16 metara, Kanal iznad Limunove dvorane and the Kanal iznad Razrušene dvorane. These successes attracted some of the younger Željezničari, (Note: Juraj Posarić and Branko Jalžić.) who under the leadership of Božić discovered much of the so-called "New Veternica" (Note: Nova Veternica) in 1964 (Note: Or 1966.) (Kristalni kanal, Mlinarev rov, Velika dvorana). It was during this time that Drago Pavličević produced his series of photographs.

From 1966 on, explorations by the Velebitaši led by Malinar and Marijan Čepelak mapped the Velebitaški kanal to 562 m, Alpinistički kanal to 501 m, Darijev kanal to 128 m and a number of smaller passages until the cumulative length of the new passages reached 2674 m. The new passages included: Ponor 16 metara dug to 68 m, Kukušni kanal to 18 m, Kanal iznad Limunove dvorane to 85 m, Stari kanal to 85 m, "Nova Veternica" to 455 m, Aneks to 86 m, Kanal iznad Razrušene dvorane to 81 m and Kanal iznad Visoke dvorane to 24 m. The Pakleni kanal was discovered in 1969 after its strong airflow was detected. Digging to allow the passage of the shallow upstream PVC-siphon with a PVC tube (Note: The cavers passed a thick PVC tube through the siphon and then passed through the PVC tube themselves. This is one of the earliest uses of this technique, which allows for dry passage but comes with significant risks.) in September 1977 led to the discovery of about 300 m of new passage to the already 5097 m long cave in the Željezničarski kanal.

Though it was never the longest cave in the Dinarides thanks to the earlier exploration of Postojna Cave, it did eventually become the longest cave in SR Croatia. In 1973, Jopićeva špilja - Bent system surpassed Veternica as the longest cave in SR Croatia, with a length of 6247 m against Veternica's 5994 m. Veternica would eventually catch up but not before being surpassed in length by other caves. On 20 November 1983, shortly after an expansion of Jopićeva špilja in the summer, the Panjkov ponor - Varićakova špilja system surpassed it as the longest cave in SR Croatia, ending competition between Veternica and Panjkov ponor, only to be surpassed itself as such on 1 September 1984 by the Đulin ponor - Medvedica system.

With further exploration of the Željezničarski kanal, June 1979 saw the total length of the cave reach 5996 m. A map of the cave finished in 1979 was published by Čepelak in 1980, though by the time of its publication it was already out of date, thanks to about 70 m of newly discovered passage in the Željezničarski kanal. Continued exploration brought the total length of the cave to 6576 m. This was due to the discovery of new passages beyond "New Veternica" in the autumn of 1984. First, Robert Dado scaled 9 m of muddy cliff with pitons on October 14th. Using those pitons, Svjetlan Hudec was able to climb a further 9 m up the same cliff on November 3rd, at the top of which was the largest chamber in the cave, named Markulinova dvorana. (Note: After long-time Veternica caver Mirko Markulin, who died later that month.)

Removing sediment with a hoe, the Velebitaši found a continuation of the Zadnji kanal. Then in several expeditions beyond the Prolaz motike, 113 m of canal were explored, so that the total length of the cave at the beginning of 1992 was 6767 m. Although no further explorations were published, several hundred meters further were explored by 1999, for a cumulative length of 7128 m.

=== Tourist cave ===
Tourists in Veternica
Year	Tourists	Source
2019	5787	
2023	3884	

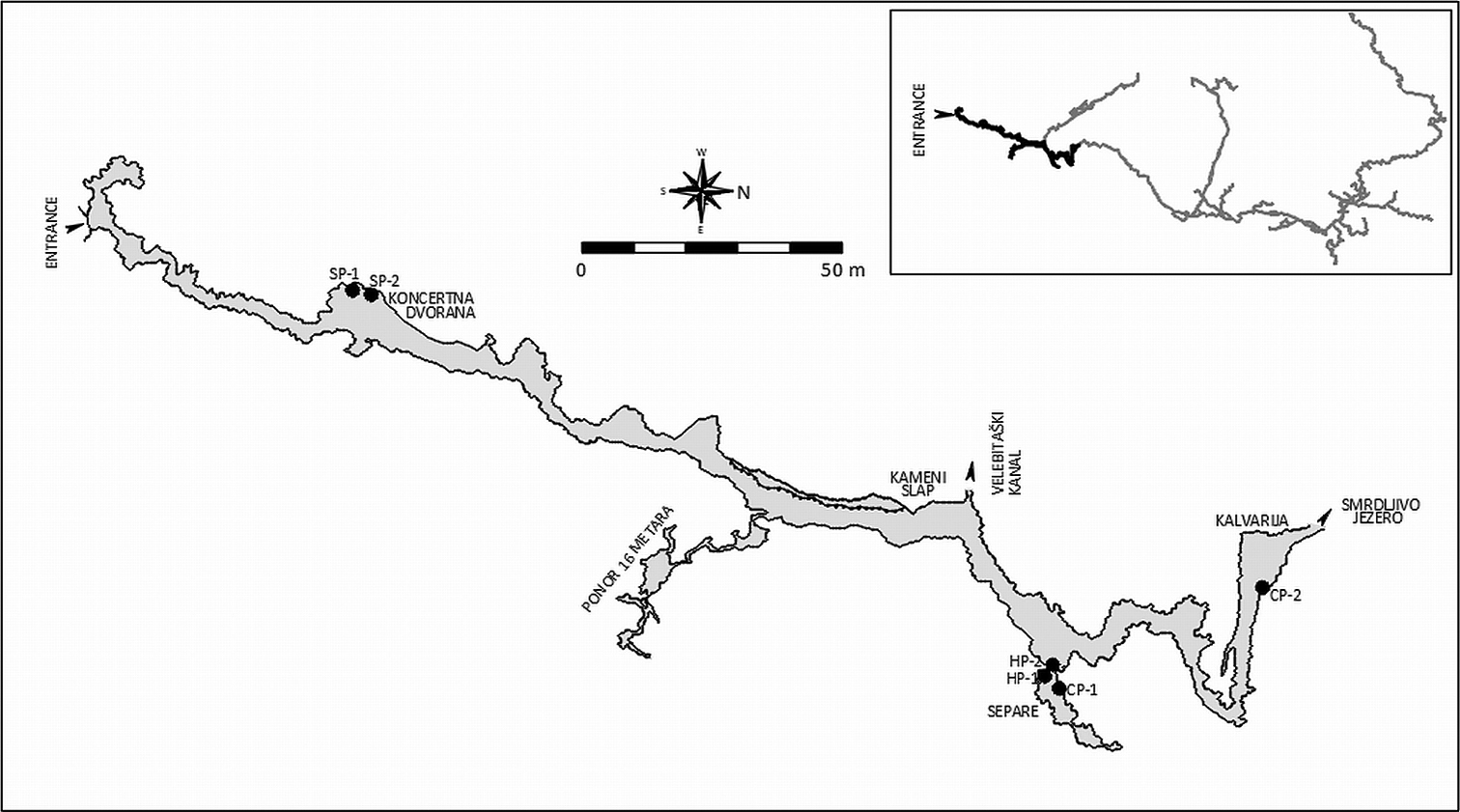
Map of tourist section

In 1977, the systematic preparation of the cave for tourism began, during which more than 860 graffitos were erased and the cave was electrified as far as Kalvarija. But already in 1978 the funding dried up thanks to the economic crisis in the SFRJ, and so the cave was not ready to accept tourists until 1979. Malinar trained the first tour guides from among the cavers of Zagreb in 1978, and these guides began to provide tours beginning in April 1979, several months before the legal designation of the cave as a Protected Natural Monument (Note: Zaštićeni spomenik prirode). At first, guides rotated, but already in 1979 the Damir Prelovec became its sole guide, replaced in 1980 by Juraj Posarić, who remained in that role until the transfer of the cave to the Nature Park Medvednica in 2000.

After control was transferred to the Javna ustanova Park prirode Medvednica, the cave was closed to tourists and restricted to training cavers for several years, reopening to tourists in 2002, but with effective restrictions on caver activity by Nives Farkaš-Topolnik after she was named its first rector due to differences of opinion on the importance of exploration. But some work was allowed to continue until a 2020 document by the new rector Marina Popijač restricted the maximum caving time to 6 hours on 1 day of the month, making exploration trips impossible. The Commission for Speleology of the Croatian Mountaineering Association (Note: Komisija za speleologiju Hrvatskog Planinarskog Saveza) confronted the park administration about it in a 2021 meeting, but their concerns were dismissed on the grounds of the results of an internal investigation on improper behaviour in the cave by members of an unnamed organisation, and declined to comment on the reasons for their restrictions upon a request from the editors of the Speleolog magazine.

The only notable steps towards exploration by cavers since the takeover were the 2009 laser telemetry of the main part of the cave from the entrance to the PVC siphon, providing greater vertical accuracy; (Note: This was followed by two separate measurement studies in 2011.) and the discovery of a new chimney inside Markulinova dvorana in 2012, alongside a few other minor passages.

== Climatology ==
The temperature in the cave is roughly 10°C year-round.

The radon concentration was measured in 2024 at various locations throughout the tourist section of the cave, with an average of 7394±104 Bq/m^{3}, and a maximum of 7542 Bq/m^{3} at the Koncertna chamber, which following the annual dose limit guideline of 20 mSv/year limits tour guides to 400 hours per year.

=== Hydrology ===
As of 1977, water was known to run through 36% of the cave. The ponors of the Jaruga doline drain into the Velebitaški kanal and the Pakleni kanal, which also receives water from the southern end of the Staglišče doline. The northern end of the Staglišče doline drains into the deeper parts of Vetrenica, which also receives water from the Ponikve polje.

One of the three largest streams in Veternica enters through the Alpinistički kanal. A smaller stream flows through th Kanal iznad Razrušene dvorane.

In the 1970s, an experiment was conducted during which the Stream 13 was rerouted into the Fosilna dvorana.

== Geology ==
As of 1977, 53.2% of the cave was in dolostone, (Note: Including Ponor 16 m, Velebitaški kanal, Separe, Pakleni kanal, Kukušni kanal and Kanal iznad Limunove dvorane.) the rest being at the dolostone-limestone contact (Note: Including Stari kanal, Nova Veternica, Alpinistički kanal, Aneks, Darijev kanal, Kanal iznad Razrušene dvorane and Kanal iznad Visoke dvorane.) or in limestone. There is some breccia and conglomerate at the end of Stari kanal, likely near contact with limestone.

Paleomagnetic analysis of fossil stream sediments has placed the lower boundary for the formation of the cave at the Brunhes–Matuyama reversal. The initial formation of the cave following the uplift of the ground above it ought to have been mostly phreatic on morphological grounds, although no dates have been produced from this period yet.

One stalactite caked in stream sediment at 680 m from the entrance was U-Th dated to about 640 ka BP, providing evidence for a vadose phase predating the second, partially phreatic phase. The oldest flowstone tested dates to 550 ka BP, before the formation of the paleolake. As the uplift continued, the mouth of the cave would have risen above the water level, leading to the formation of lower springs similar to Dubravica. This mostly vadose phase would have included subterranean lakes.

Much of the formation of Veternica formed in lacustrine conditions at least about 380 ka BP at the unconformable contact between Miocene marly limestone and underlying Triassic dolostone, as a largely phreatic subterranean paleolake 475 m upstream inside the cave. It was during this period that the shelfstones in Majmunski prolaz at about 450 m from the entrance formed. Sediment buildup blocking lower springs is proposed as the reason for the water level rise that allowed for phreatic conditions to dominate. The water level of the paleolake declined only slightly during this period, despite leaving 9 different shelfstone levels.

Between about 245 and 235 ka BP, the system experienced a geologically rapid water level drop, as evidenced by the transition from shelfstone to flowstone. It has been suggested that this water table fall was due to the ~350 m tectonic uplift along the southern flanks of Medvednica in the Quaternary, which could also explain the recession of the main stream from the siphons Ponor 16 metara and Kukušni to Glavni. On the evidence of the flowstone in the Velebitaški kanal, the subterranean water level must have fallen by at least 6 m. Following this event, the Stone Waterfall (Serbo-Croatian: Kameni slap) flowstone formation at about 250 m from the entrance began forming about 212 ka BP and continued to about 205 ka BP, as the result of paleowater flow from the Velebitaški channel. By the end of its formation, the water level had fallen by a total of about 14 m since the final phase of shelfstone formation.

After hydrological activity ceased at the end of the Riss glaciation, the oldest clastic sediments at the cave entrance were deposited. This corresponds to layer K; layer J was deposited during the Riss-Würm interglacial (MIS 5e, 130-115 ka BP); layers I-D were deposited during the Würm glaciation, of which I-H from MIS 5 to MIS 3, 115-40 ka BP

The fifth layer of the chamber at the entrance was formed in a single catastrophic erosion episode that covered the entire entrance, following which all mammalian habitation of the cave seems to have ceased. This is layer G. It has been connected to the colder conditions during MIS 4, 71-57 ka BP; or one of the colder phases of MIS 3, 57-29 ka BP, which would match layers F and E which are dated to MIS 3, 40-30 ka BP.

Layer D was deposited during mostly after the Last Glacial Maximum during MIS 2, 29-14 ka BP. Layer C is a calcite cap that formed at the transition from the Pleistocene to the Holocene. layer B and the humus layer A formed in the Holocene.

== Paleontology ==
=== Anthropology ===
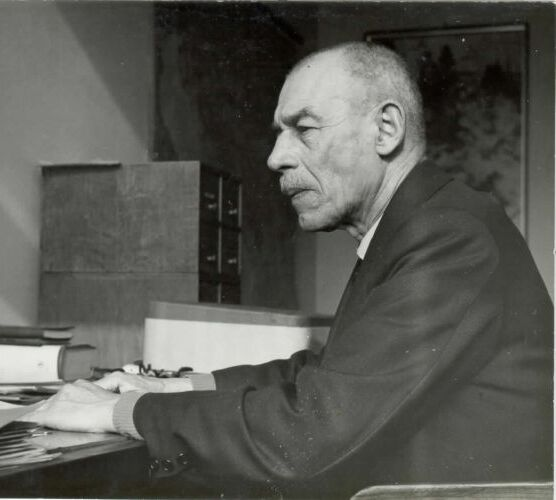
Srečko Brodar in 1962

Layers H, I and J contain artefacts belonging to the Mousterian culture. At least layers I and J are beyond the limits of ^{14}C dating. Only layers H-I yielded bone implements, including 33 knapping bones, of which 13 were fashioned from the bones of Ursus spelaeus, which is a record for the Middle Paleolithic. As of 2020, more than 500 stone artefacts have been unearthed at Veternica, of which 46% quartz and 28% chert.

In 1956, the discovery of a human skull believed at the time to be around 150,000 years old was published, prompting a number of prominent anthropologists to visit Zagreb, including Hallam L. Movius, Germaine Henri-Martin, Ulrich Schaefer, Srečko Brodar, Božo Škerlj, Branko Gavela and others. This skull, from layer H, turned out to be that of an anatomically modern human, the depth being explained as by burial practices. The remains were radiocarbon dated to the Roman period in 2024.

9 Mousterian fire pits were discovered from 1955 on: 2 in front of the cave and the rest in the entrance chamber. One of the charcoal samples is too old for ^{14}C dating, with a minimum result of 50 ka BP.

In layer F, several stone implement fragments were discovered, which Malez assigned to the Aurignacian solely on stratigraphic grounds, but thanks to these implements being mixed with the Mousterian implements, it was not possible to identify them during a verification attempt. The same applies to the chert and quartz implements discovered in layer D, although layer D also included one fire pit. Layer D also contained 4 skulls, of which 3 together with 1 femur and scattered U. spelaeus bones beneath a stone slab, one of which had cut marks.

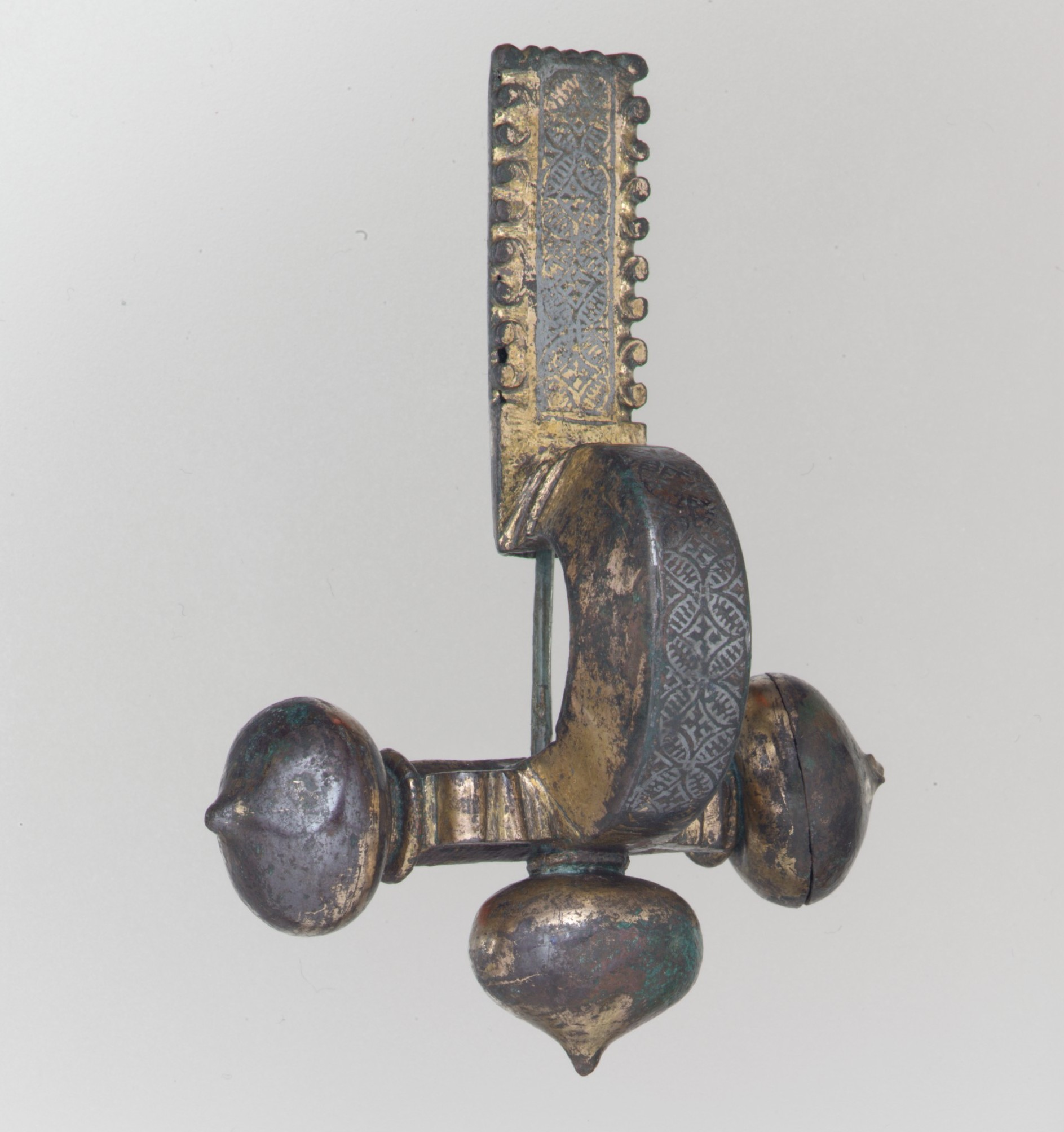
4th century Roman crossbow fibula

Among the more recent finds are 3rd century Roman coins, a bronze fibula. These and a number of ceramic artefacts from the Neolithic through Late antiquity were found in layers B and A, of which none in layer A predate the Iron Age; though several finds from antiquity were found beneath layer C. At the very end of the NW passage, there was a walled Neolithic graveyard with strewn human bones, including whole and fragmentary skulls, all belonging to young individuals, some of whom were children. Also in the NW passage, layer B yielded a human skull, which because of association with Bronze implements was dated to the Bronze Age. During excavations in 2015-2016, human remains were founded that dated to the 3rd-4th centuries, together with a Roman coin and a bronze needle.

The skull of a modern human was unearthed near the entrance in 2002 by a team led by Nikola Vukosavljević. The skeletal remains of five recent individuals (three males, one woman and one child) unearthed in 1949 were likewise found near the entrance.

As of 2024, all human remains found within the cave have been dated or redated to the Roman period: S2 to AD 127–250, S6 to AD 218–365, S4 to AD 224–556, S3 to AD 243–353, VETPN_{5} to AD 336–440, and VET_{15}SJ_{104}K6 to AD 419–598. The radiocarbon dating of S1 failed.

=== Paleobotany ===
Fossils of Lithothamnion algae have been found, responsible for the upper layer of the cave.

=== Paleozoology ===
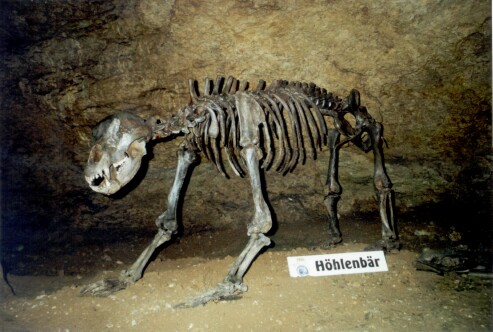
Panthera spelaea specimen on display in Veternica

In 1955, a complete Ursus spelaeus skeleton was unearthed, its presence having been known since 1934, comprising 75% of all animal bones, and even more in layers E and F, reaching 99% in F. This was in addition to a number of Panthera spelaea bones, and teeth of Castor fiber and Marmota marmota. The remaining species included Canis lupus lupus, Capra ibex, and Sus scrofa.

The remaining species include: Alces alces, Bison priscus, Capreolus capreolus, Cervus elaphus hippelaphus, Cricetus sp., Cuon alpinus, Felis silvestris, Hystrix sp., Lepus europaeus, Martes foina, Martes martes, Meles meles Mustela erminea, Mustela putorius, Panthera pardus, Rupicapra rupicapra, Stephanorhinus sp., Ursus arctos arctos, Vulpes vulpes, and others.

The Crocuta spelaea specimen found in layer F remains unconfirmed.

== Fauna ==
=== Vertebrates ===
18 species of bat have been recorded in Veternica, of which 12 regularly hibernate in the cave. It is inhabited year-round by small numbers of Rhinolophus ferrumequinum; for winter hybernation by colonies of Myotis emarginatus, Rhinolophus hipposideros, and R. ferrumequinum; and in summer by R. euryale and R. mehelyi.

The bat population was discovered to be in decline in 2003. To protect the bats, winter visits to the cave were banned in 2004, and a bat-friendly gate was put in place in 2005. In January 2019, the R. hipposideros population consisted of 1290 individuals, but after 15 years of constistant growth a drop to 528 individuals in January 2021 was noticed. Over the next three winters, the population continued to decline.

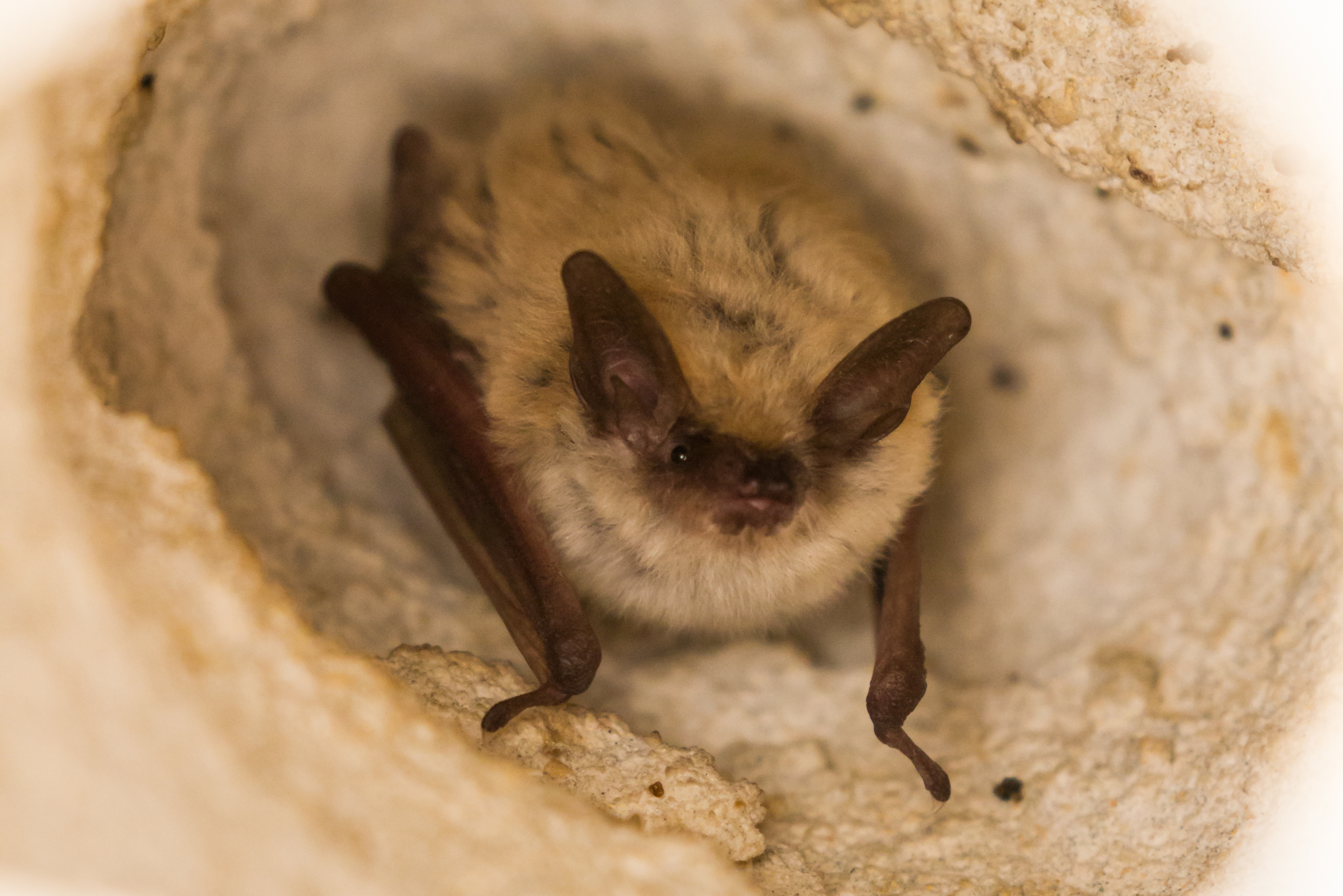
Myotis emarginatus

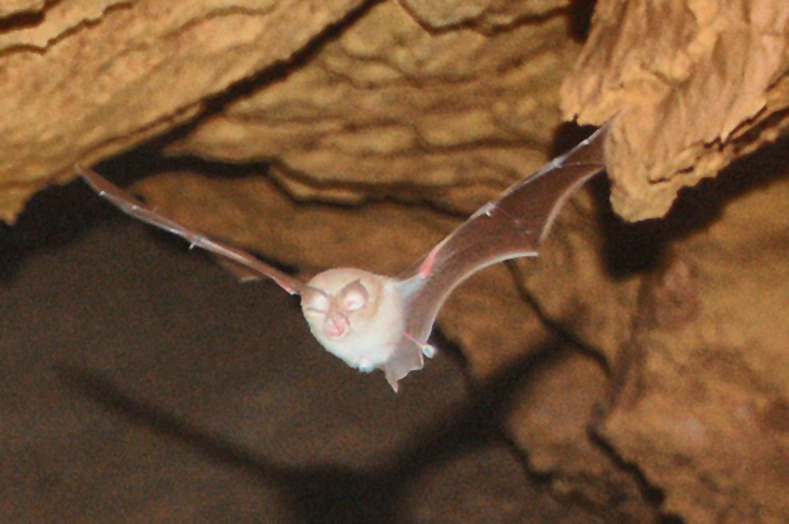
Rhinolophus euryale

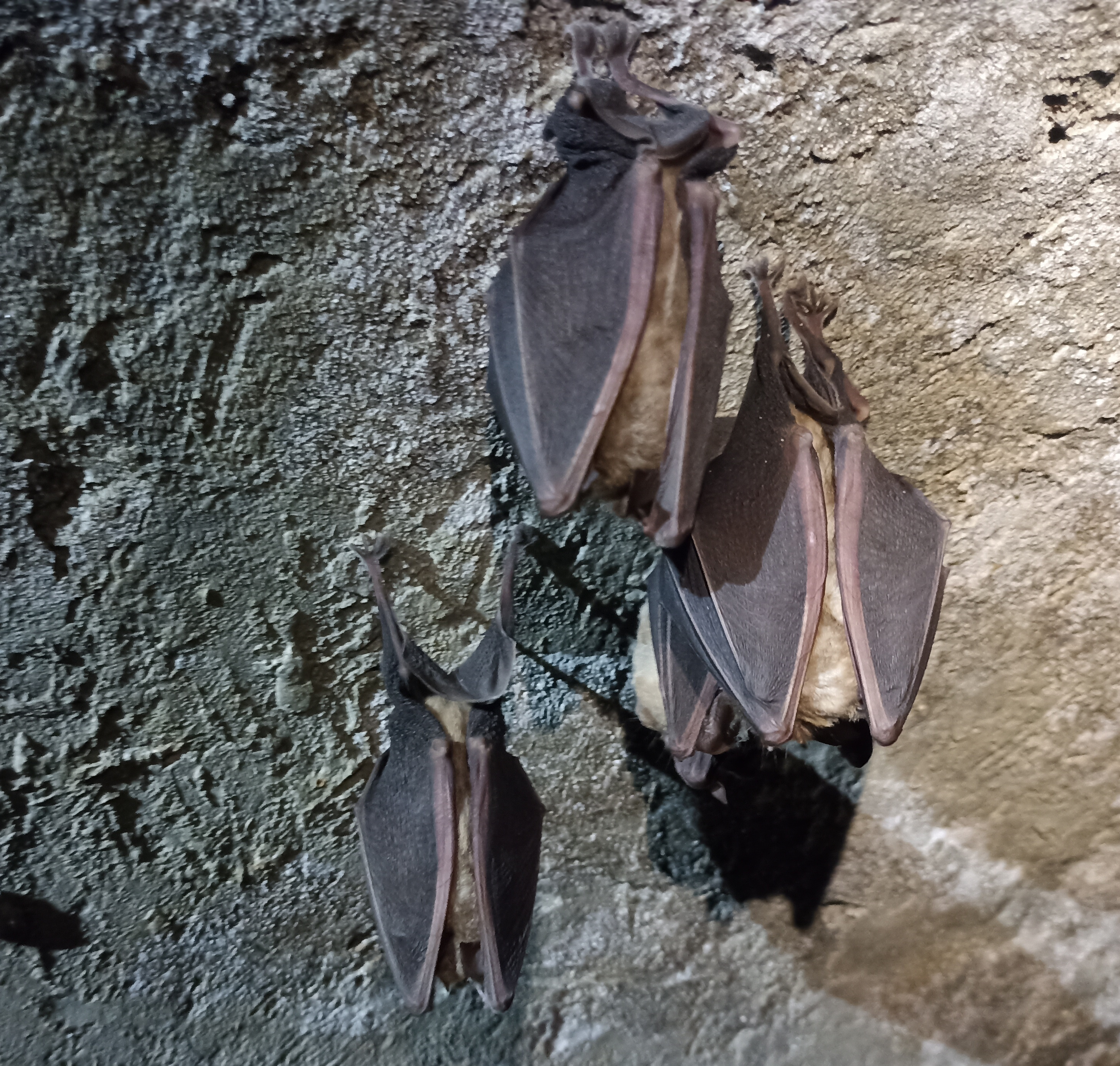
R. ferrumequinum

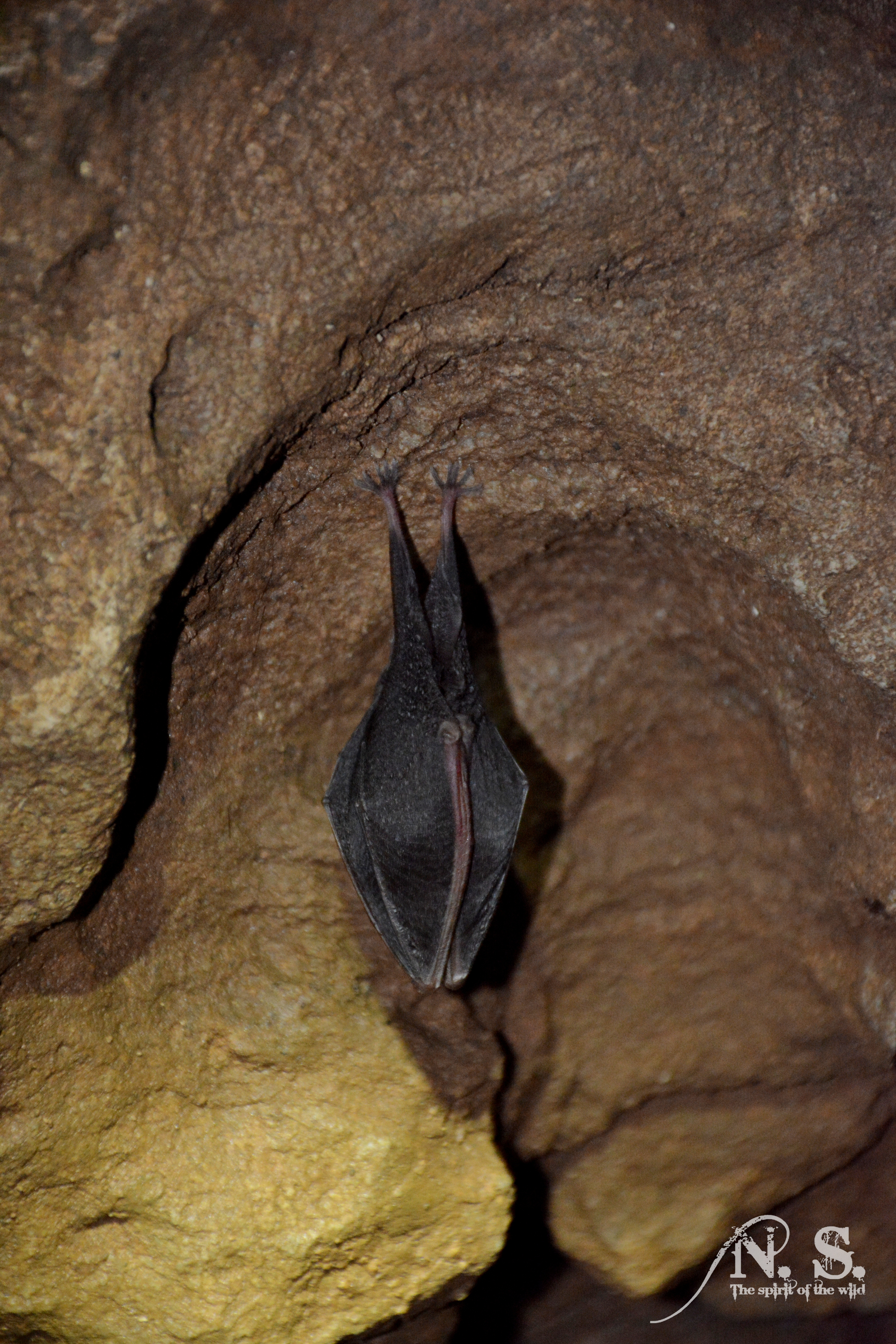
R. hipposideros

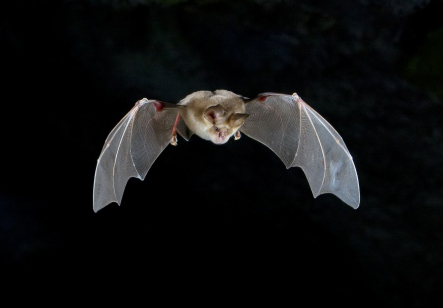
R. mehelyi

=== Invertebrates ===
It is the only known locality for Pseudosinella dallaii Gisin & Gama, described at this site.

It is one of only 2 locations recorded for the Medvednica endemic Anophthalmus kaufmanni subsp. weingaertneri Winkler.

In 1988, a Chthonius specimen collected by Branko Jalžić was described as Chthonius raridentatus, though in 2014 this was shown to be Chthonius raridentatus Hadži.

Other invertebrates include Eukoenenia sp., Heteromurus nitidus Templeton, Lithobius sp., Mesoniscus graniger Frivaldsky, Niphargus likanus Karaman, Plusiocampa cf. nivea Joseph, Rhagidia sp., Schubartia lohmanderi Verhoeff, Scoliopteryx libatrix L., Troglohyphantes excavatus Fage, Troglophilus cavicola Kollar.

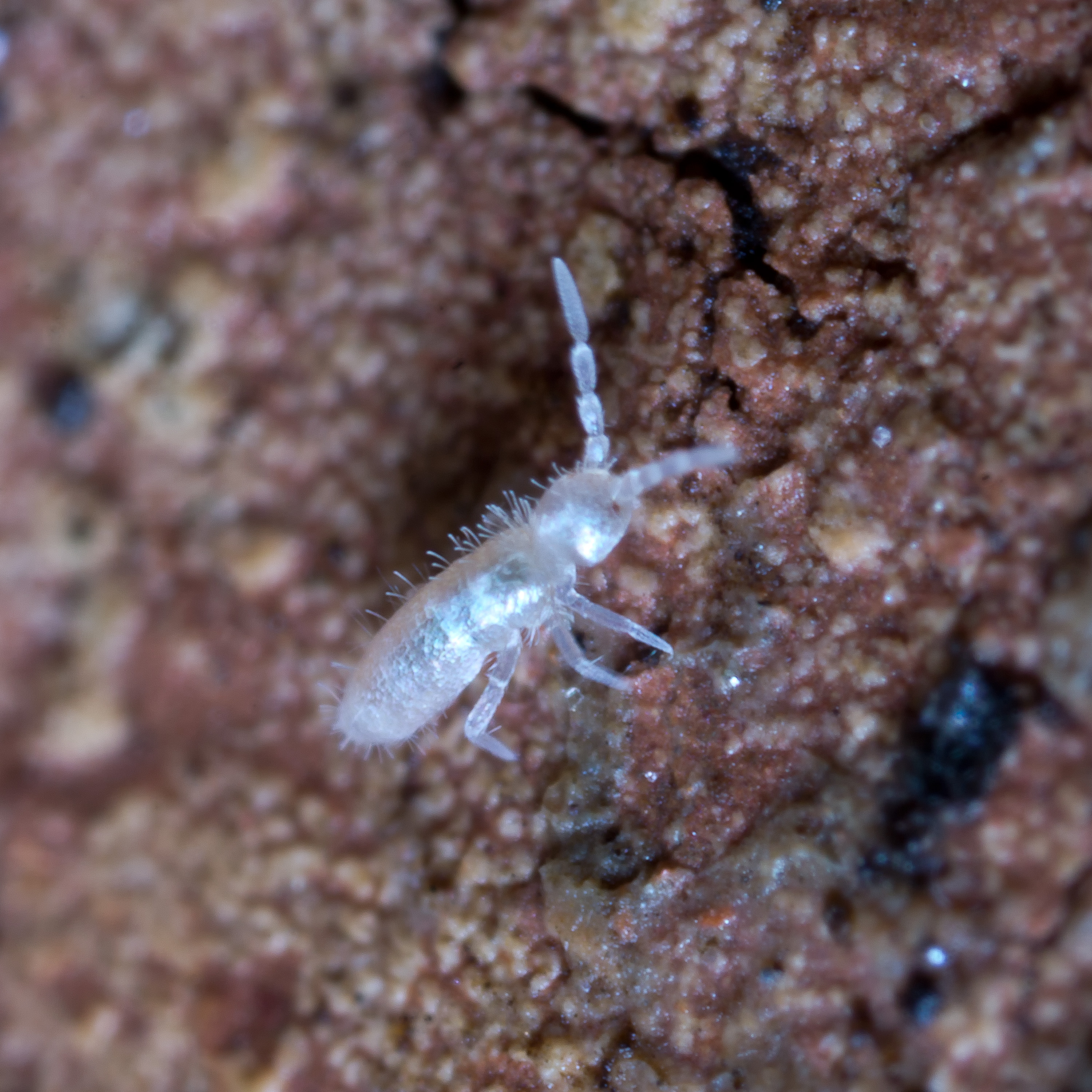
Heteromurus nitidus

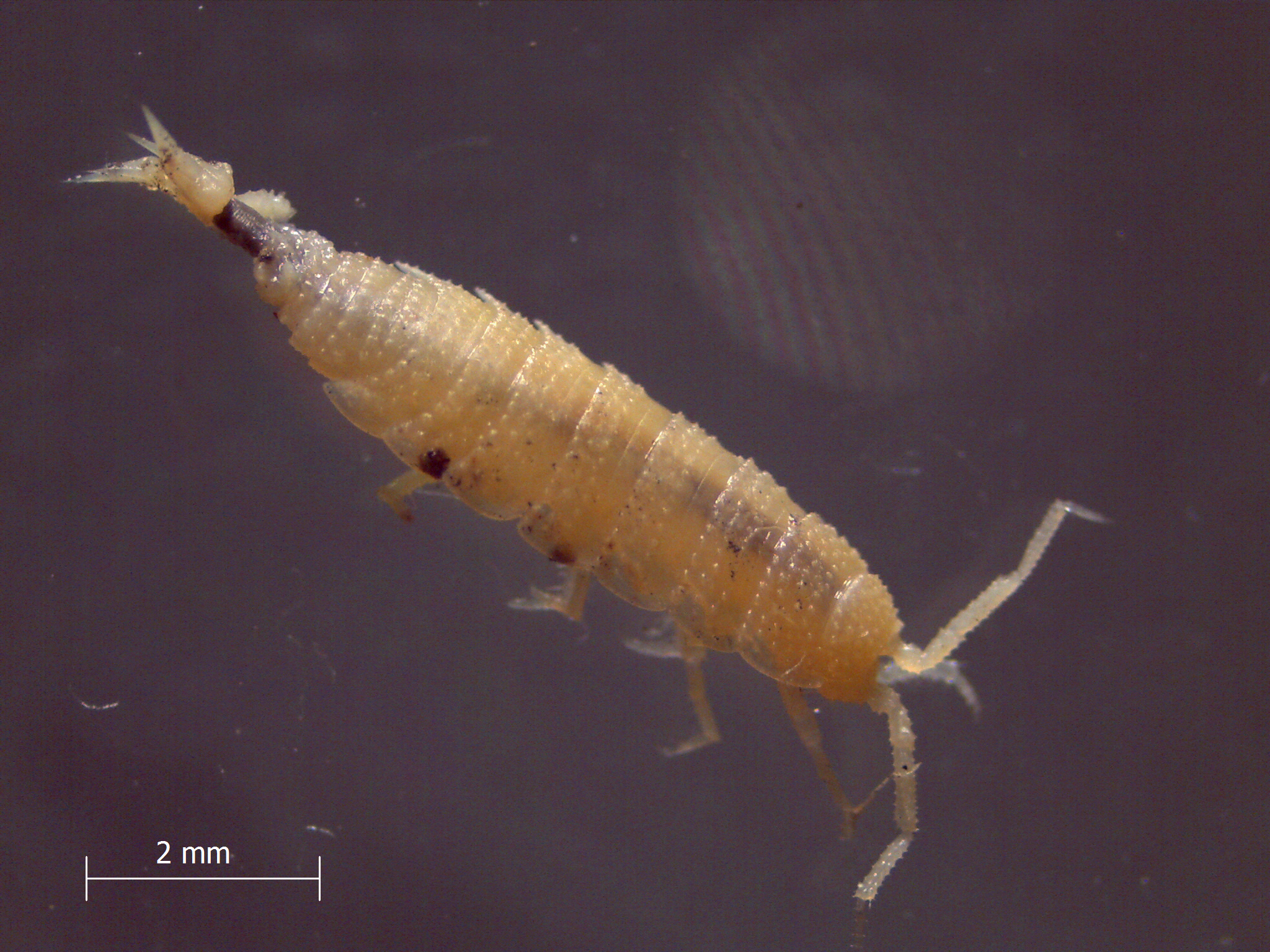
Mesoniscus graniger

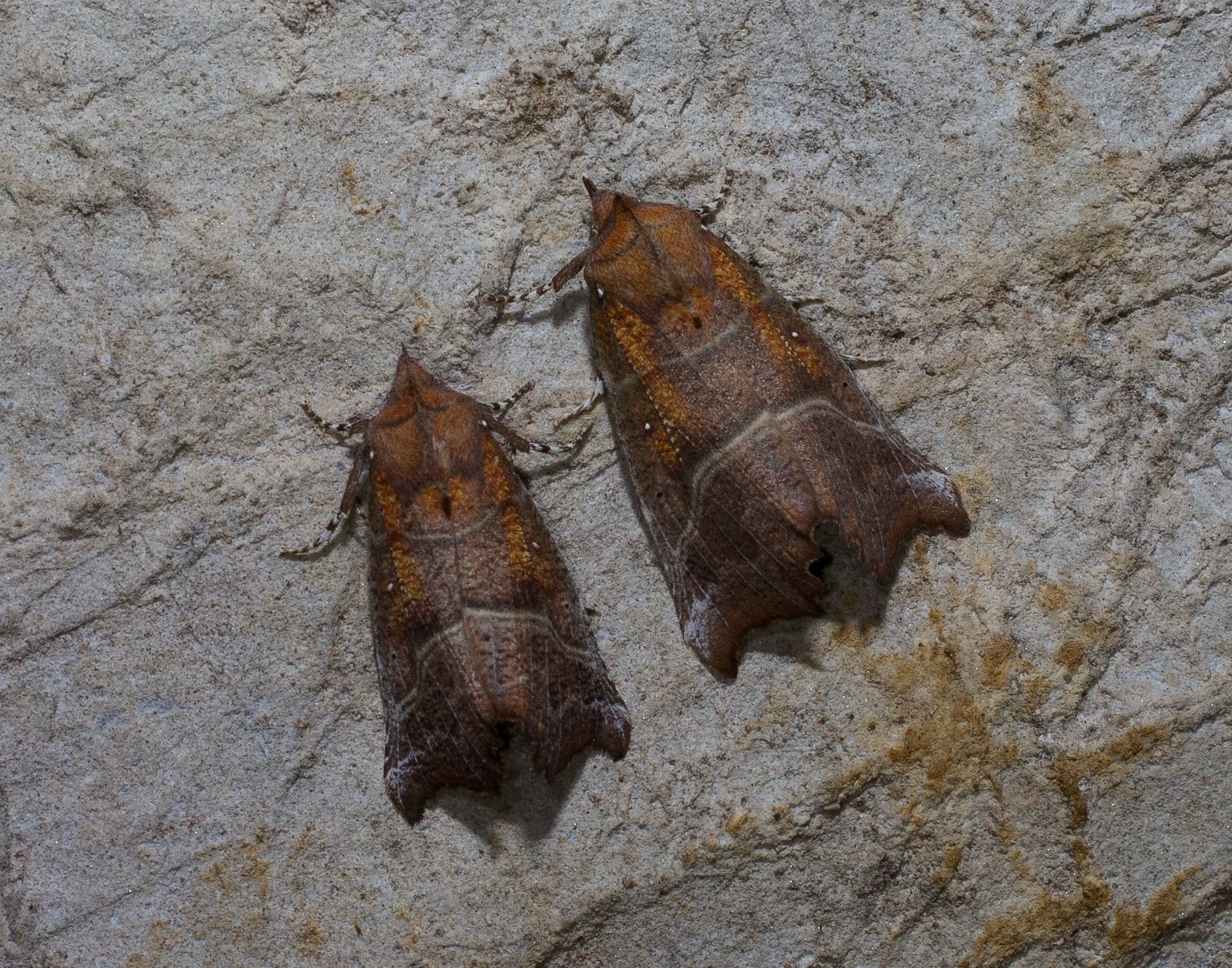
S. libatrix

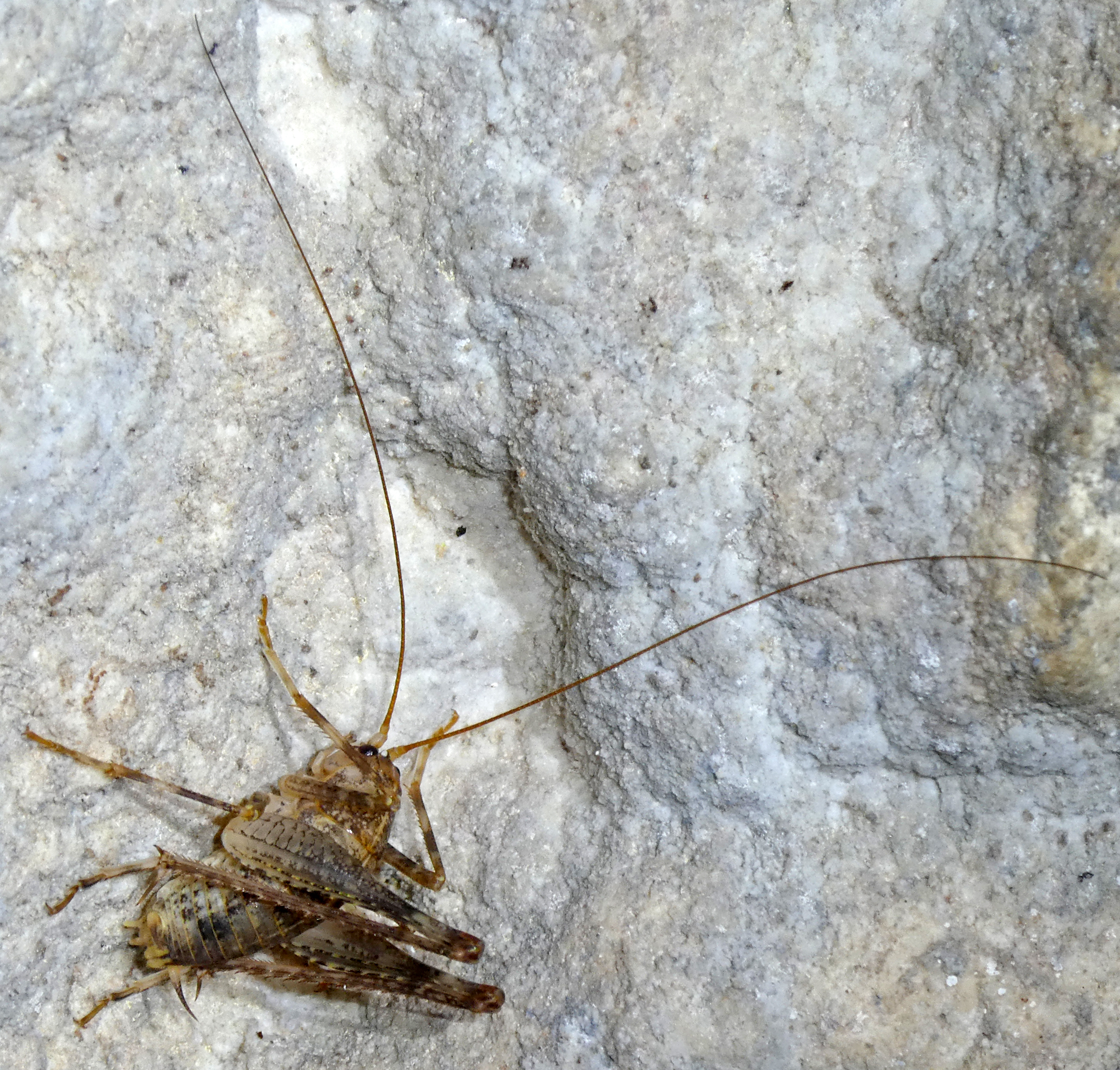
Troglophilus cavicola

=== Microfauna ===
The Veternica cave is home to at least 47 protist species. The highest diversity (36 species) and abundance (>500 individuals/mL) is found in those sinter pools richest in bat guano. The most widespread protist is Euglypha laevis Ehrenberg. Sphatidium sp. are only found in clay pools. A. rotundata Playfair is restricted to a hygropetric habitat.

==== Amoebozoa ====
Amoebozoa include the Veternica endemic Centropyxis bipilata Baković, Siemensma et al. and a number of other species: Arcella artocrea Leidy, A. rotundata Playfair, Centropyxis aculeata Ehrenberg, C. aerophila Deflandre, C. constricta Ehrenberg, C. elongata Penard, C. laevigata Penard, C. plagiostoma Bonnet & Thomas, Cochliopodium sp., Cryptodifflugia oviformis Penard, C. pusilla Playfair, C. sacculus Penard, Cyclopyxis eurystoma Deflandre, Cyphoderia ampulla Ehrenberg, Difflugia oblonga Ehrenberg, D. cf. pristis Penard, Diplochlamys sp., Diplophrys sp., Euglypha bryophila Brown, E. laevis Ehrenberg, E. rotunda Wailes, E. tuberculata Dujardin, cf. Flamella sp., Frenzelina sp., Heleopera sp., Korotnevella sp., Mayorella sp., Microchlamys patella Claparède & Lachmann, Microcometes paludosa Cienkowski, Plagiopyxis declivis Bonnet, Pyxidicula sp., Rhizamoeba sp., Tracheleuglypha dentata Deflandre, and Trinema lineare Penard, T. enchelys Ehrenberg, Vahlkampfia sp., Vanella sp.

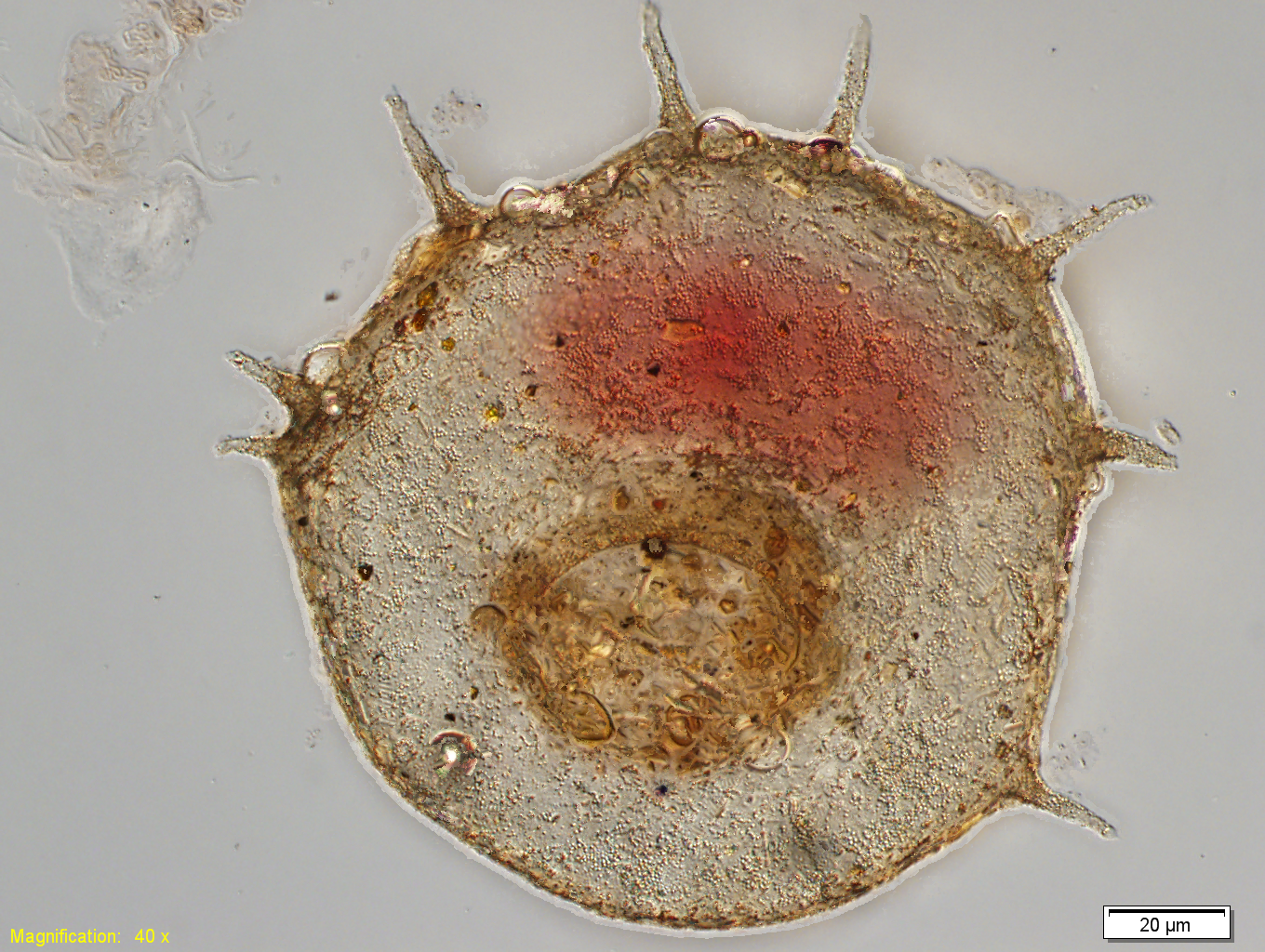
Centropyxis aculeata

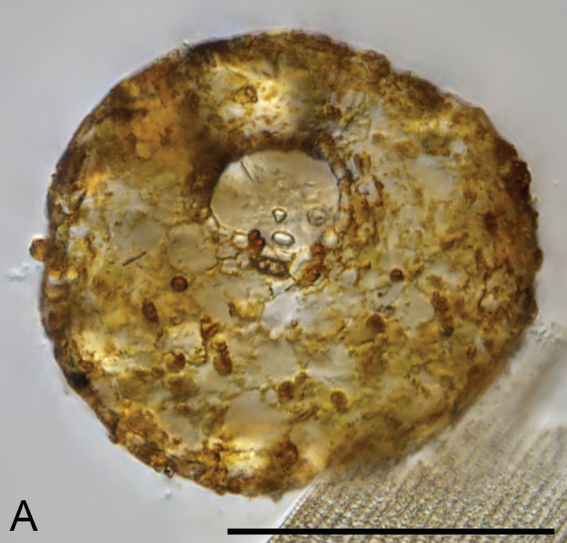
Centropyxis bipilata from Veternica

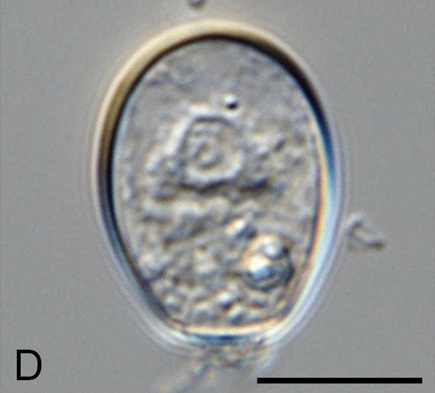
Cryptodifflugia oviformis from Veternica

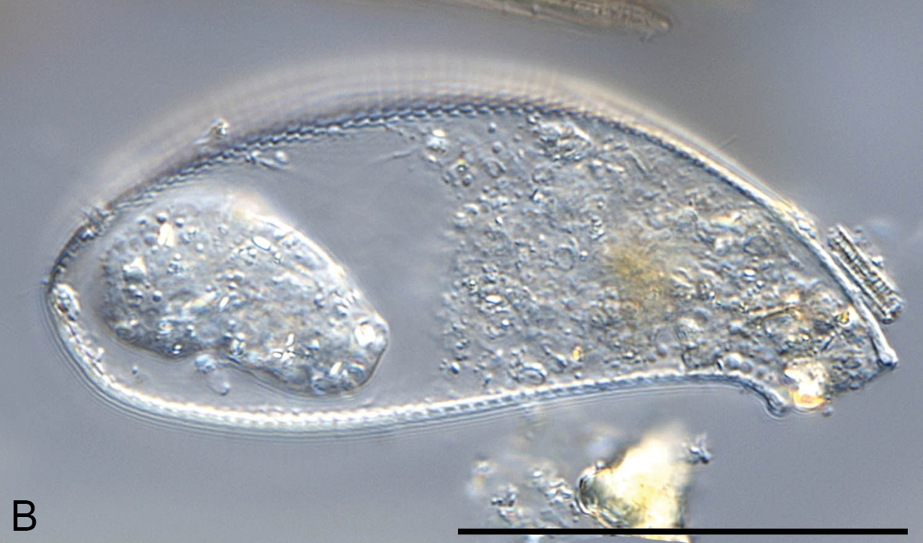
Cyphoderia ampulla from Veternica

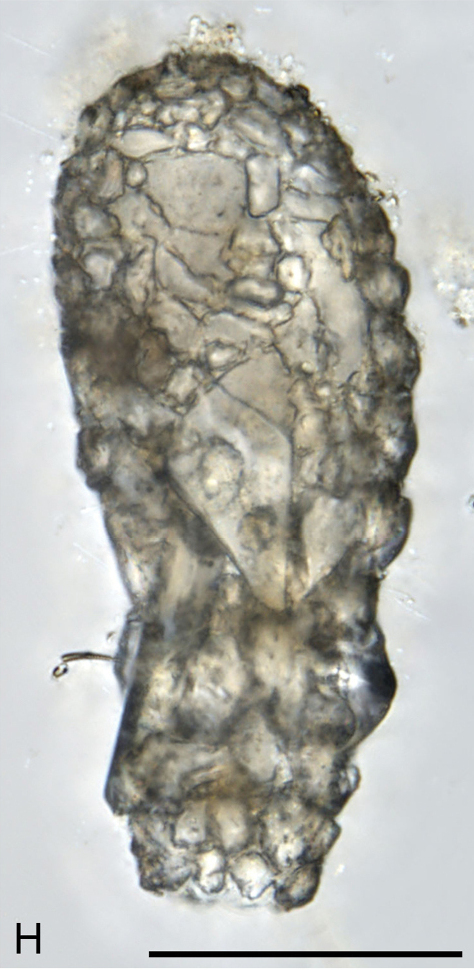
Difflugia oblonga from Veternica

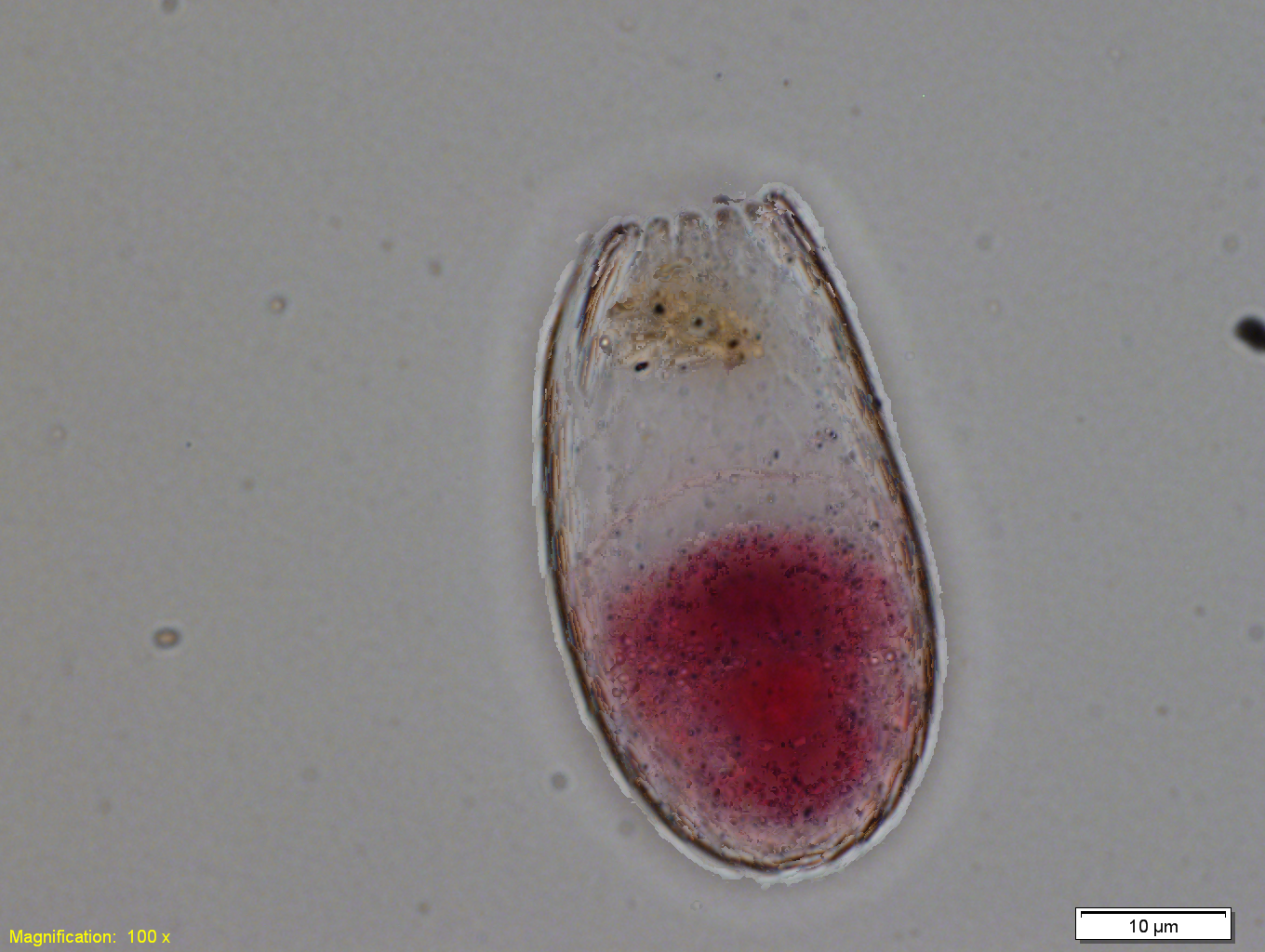
Euglypha laevis

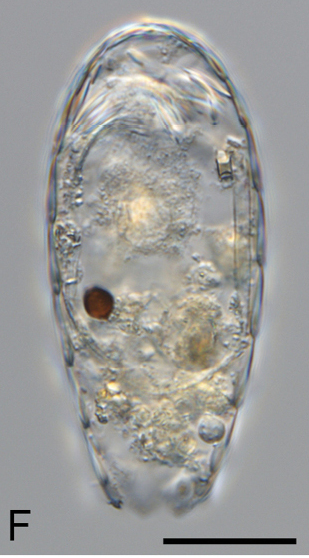
Euglypha tuberculata from Veternica

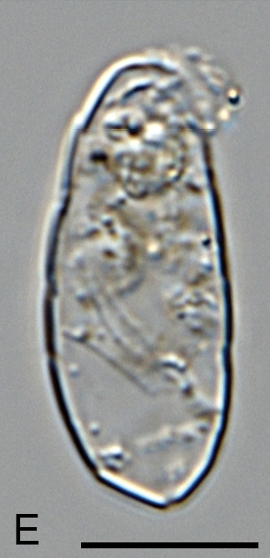
Trinema lineare from Veternica

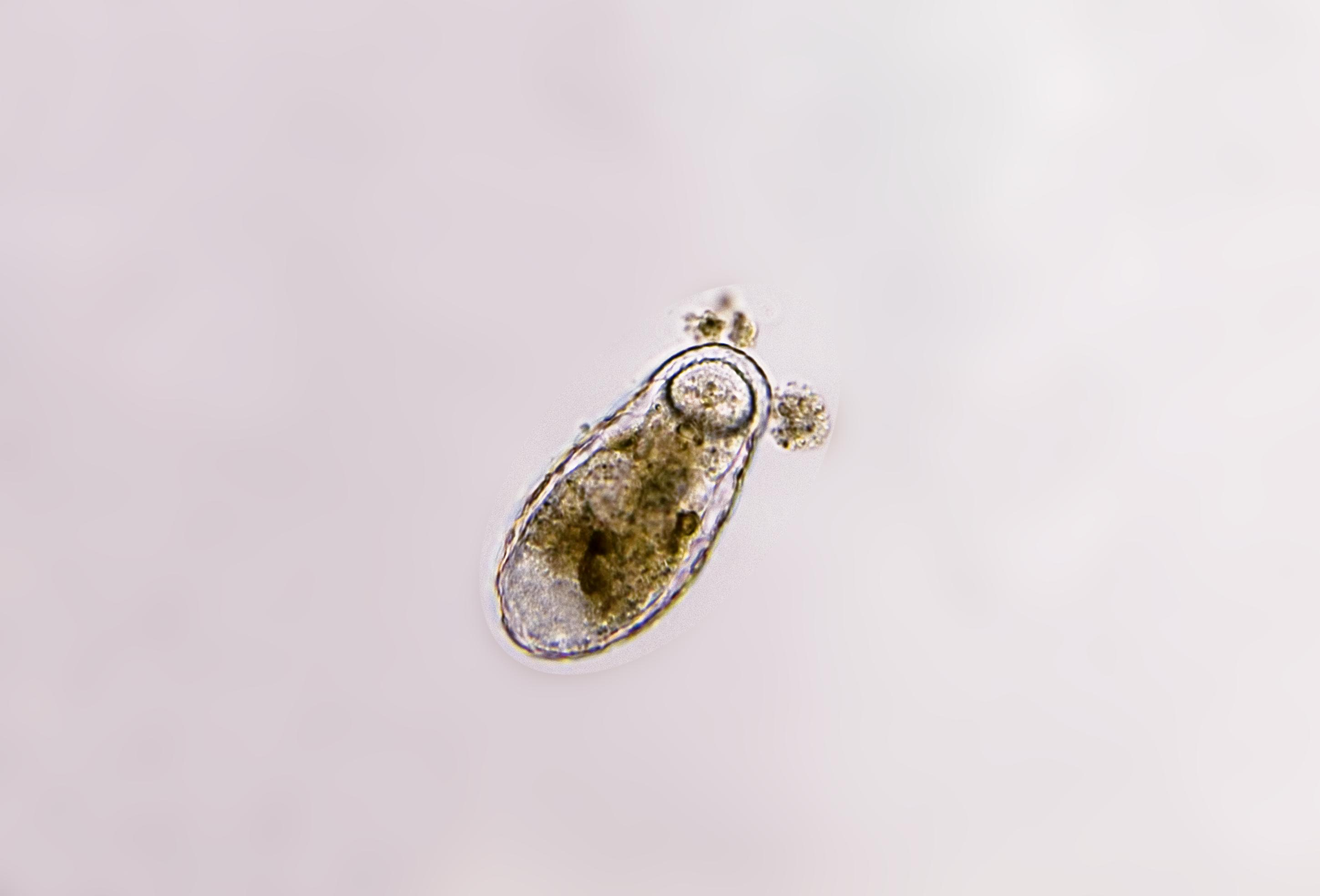
Trinema enchelys

==== Heliozoa ====
Heliozoa include Acanthocystis myriospina Penard emend. Dürrschmidt and Raphidocystis marginata Zlatogursky ex Siemensma.

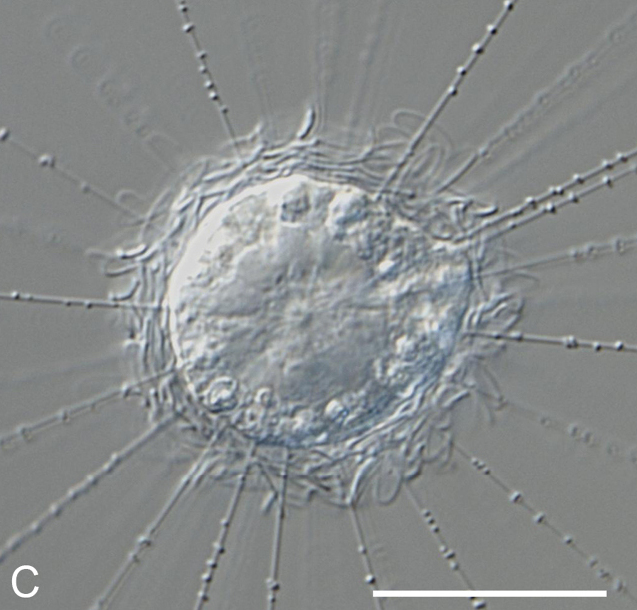
Acanthocystis myriospina from Veternica

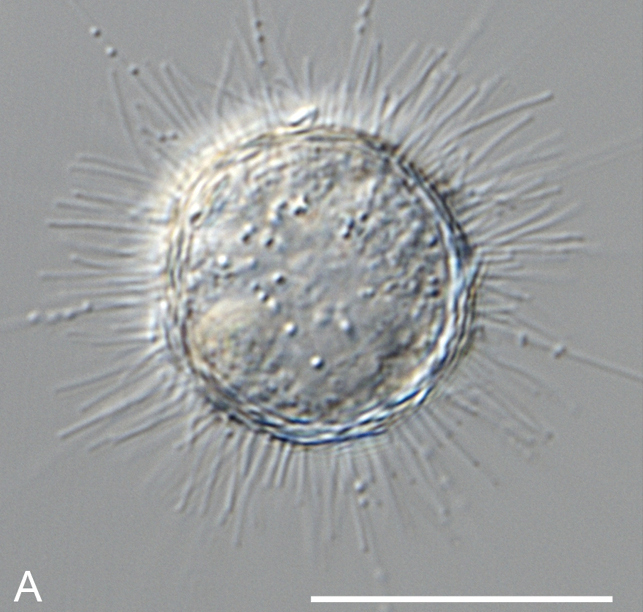
Raphidocystis marginata from Veternica

==== Ciliophora ====
Ciliophora include Cinetochilum margaritaceum Perty, Colpoda steini Maupas, Cyclidium glaucoma O.F.M., Euplotes sp., Glaucoma sp., Litonotus lamella Schewiakoff, Nassulida sp., Pleuronema sp., Pyxicola sp., Sphatidium sp., Vorticella sp.

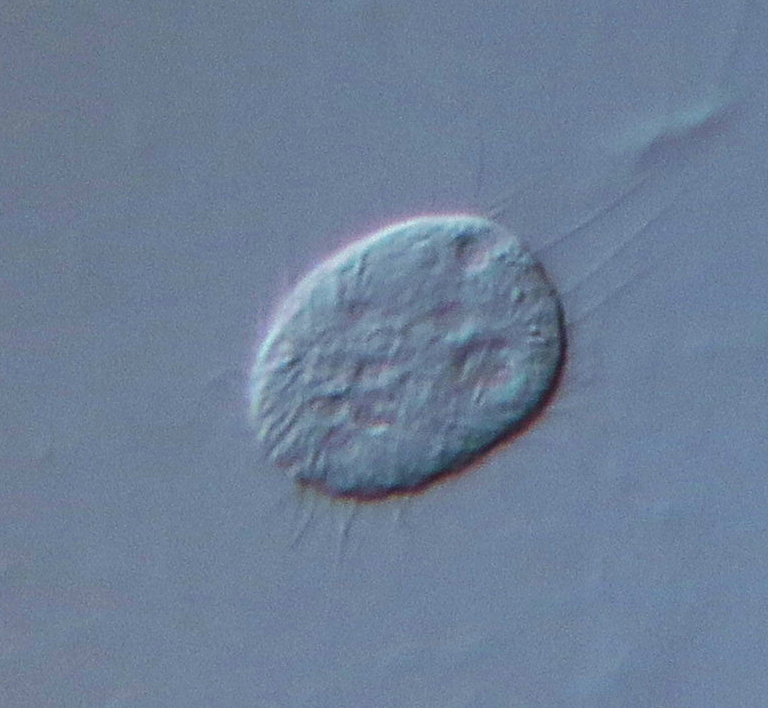
Cinetochilum margaritaceum

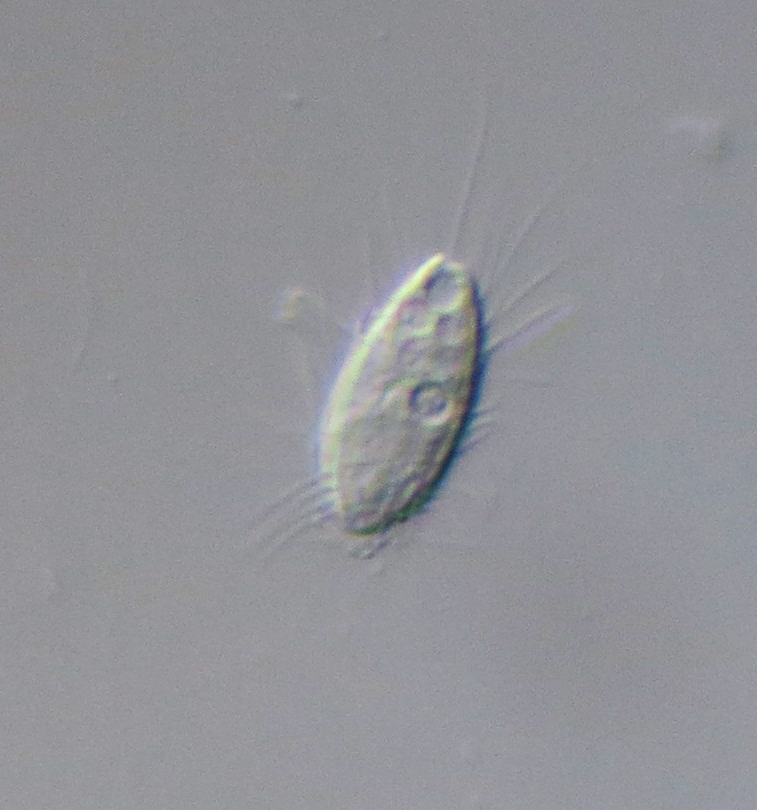
Cyclidium glaucoma

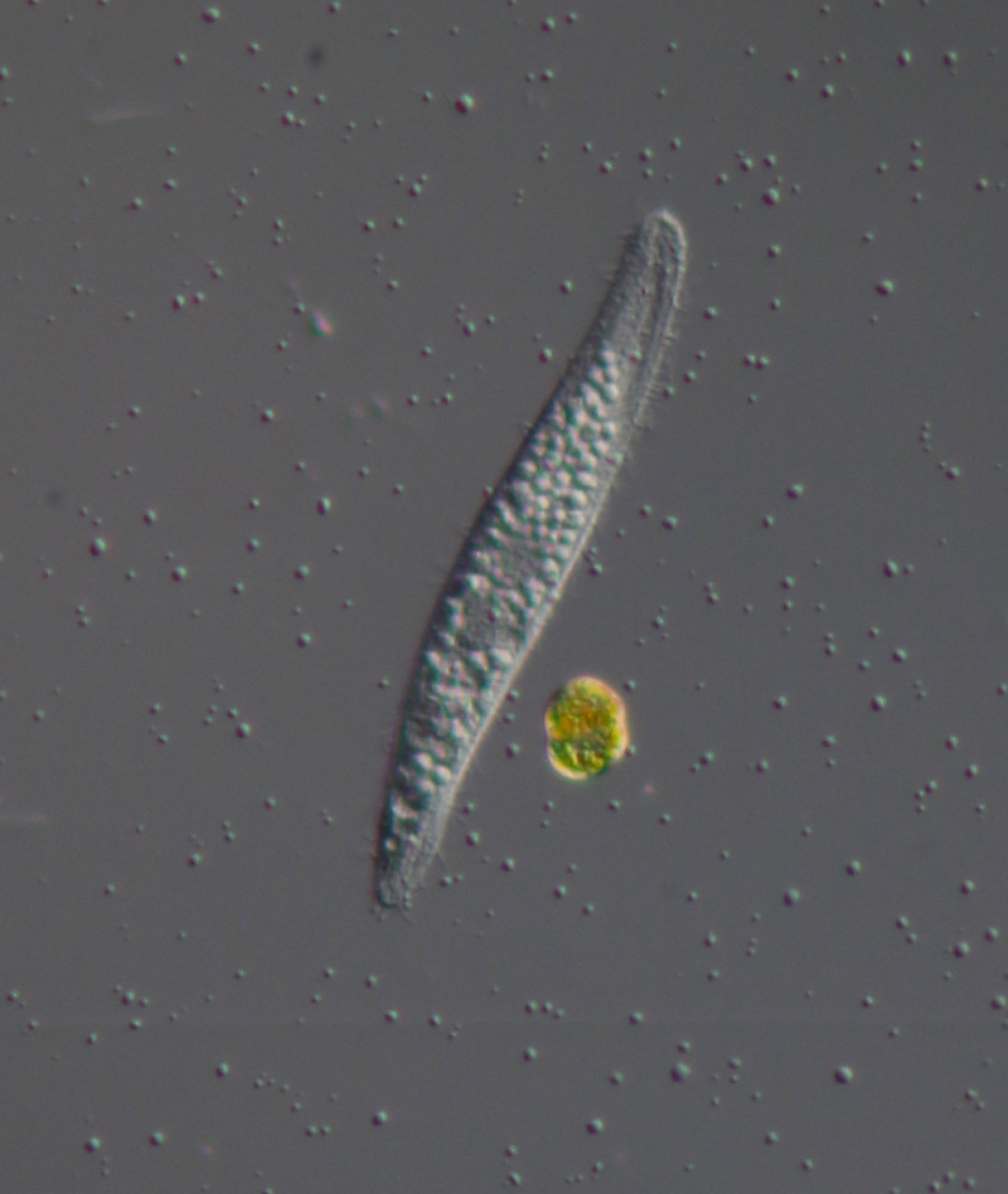
Litonotus lamella

==== Heterokonta ====
The cave is also home to the Stramenopiles species Actinophrys sol Ehrenberg and the Heterotrophic Flagellate species Peranema trichophorum Ehrenberg.

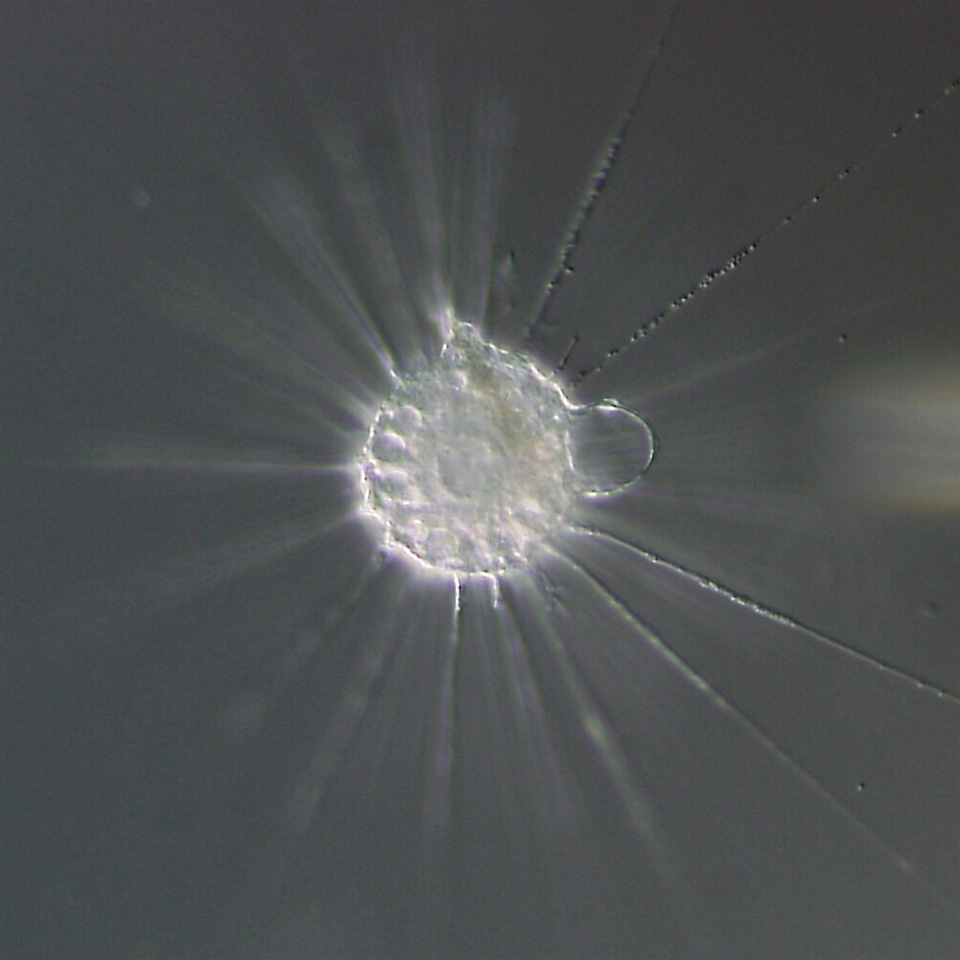
Actinophrys sol

== Selected works ==
- Poljak, Josip (1934). "Pećina "Veternica" u Zagrebačkoj gori" ["Veternica" Cave in Zagrebačka gora]. Priroda. Vol. 24, no. 5. pp. 133–139. ISSN 0351-0662.
- Božičević, Srećko (1959). "Pećina Veternica nekada, sada i u budućnosti" [Veternica Cave Once, Now and in the Future]. Speleolog. 7–8 (7–8) (published 1960-12-01): 7–24. ISSN 0490-4109.
- Božičević, Srećko (1974). "Podzemni krški fenomeni planine Medvednice kraj Zagreba" [Subterranean Karst Phenomena of Medvednica Mountain by Zagreb]. Acta Carsologica. 6: 97–109. ISSN 0583-6050.
- Čepelak, Marijan (1976). "Novija i buduća speleološka istraživanja u Veternici" [Recent and Coming Speleological Explorations in "Veternica"]. Speleolog. 24–25 (24–25) (published 1977-12-01): 1–8. ISSN 0490-4109.
- Čepelak, Marijan (1979). "Objašnjenja uz nacrt špilje Veternice" [Explanations with a Map of Veternica Cave]. Speleolog. 26–27 (26–27) (published 1980-01-02): 33–34. ISSN 0490-4109.
- Banda, Marko; Karavanić, Ivor (2019-12-13). "Mustjerska industrija špilje Veternice" [The Mousterian industry of Veternica cave]. Prilozi Instituta Za Arheologiju U Zagrebu. 36: 5–40. doi:10.33254/piaz.36.1. eISSN 1848-6371.
- Uredništvo (2024-03-04). "90 godina istraživanja špilje Veternice" [90 Years of Exploring the Veternica Cave]. Speleolog. 71 (71): 6–7. eISSN 2623-7385.
- Bolonić, Zoran; Božić, Vlado; Čepelak, Marijan; Lacković, Damir; Malinar, Hrvoje; Medenica, Tila (2024-03-04). "Povijest speleoloških istraživanja i uređivanja špilje Veternice" [History of Speleological Exploration and Development of the Veternica Cave]. Speleolog. 71 (71): 8–25. eISSN 2623-7385.
- Bajo, Petra; Glumac, Bosiljka; Lacković, Damir; Sasowsky, Ira D.; Stroj, Andrej (2024-03-04). "Kako je nastala špilja Veternica?" [How did Veternica Cave form?]. Speleolog. 71 (71): 26–41. eISSN 2623-7385.
- Banda, Marko (2024-03-04). "Arheologija špilje Veternice" [The Archaeology of Veternica Cave]. Speleolog. 71 (71): 42–57. eISSN 2623-7385.

== See also ==
- List of caves on Zagrebačka gora
- List of deepest Dinaric caves
- List of longest Dinaric caves

== Bibliography ==
- JUPPM (2024-02-29). Izvješće o ostvarivanju plana upravljanja, i godišnjeg programa zaštite, očuvanja, promicanja i korištenja Parka prirode Medvednica za 2023. godinu (PDF) (in Serbo-Croatian).
- Prgomet, Petra (2025-07-25) [defended 2025-07-17]. Uloga i vrednovanje zaštićenih prirodnih područja Grada Zagreba u turističkoj ponudi [The role and evaluation of protected natural areas the City of Zagreb as part of tourism offer] (Thesis) (in Serbo-Croatian). Zagreb: Sveučilište VERN.
