= Medvednica =

Mountain in central Croatia

- Zagrebačka gora, Bistranjska gora, Markuševačka gora, Stubička gora, Vrabečka gora
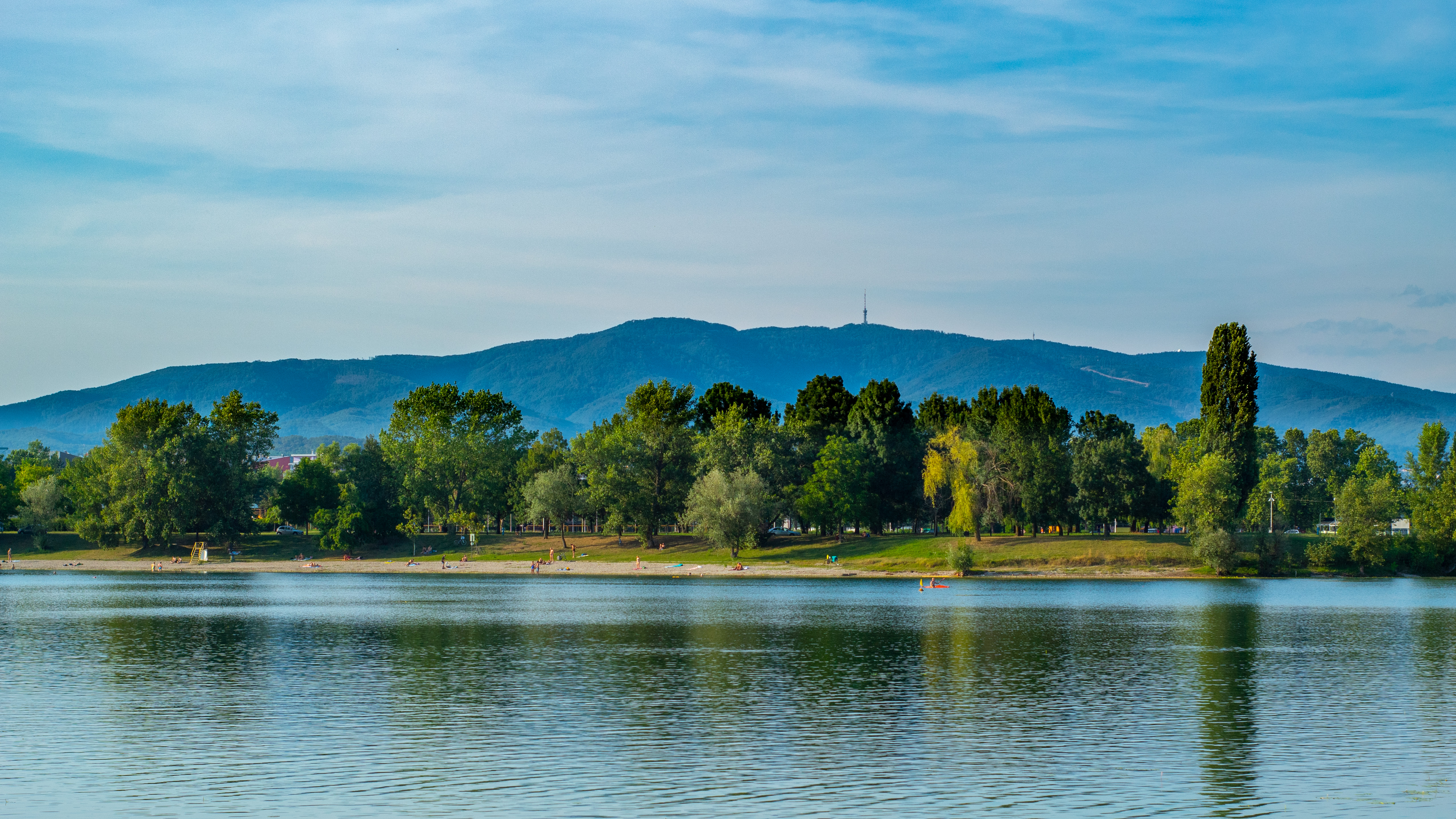
- View of Medvednica from Jarun Lake

Highest point
- Peak: Sljeme
- Elevation: 1,035 m (3,396 ft)

Geography
- Location within Croatia
- Country: Croatia
- Range coordinates: 45°55′N 15°58′E

Medvednica (pronounced [mědʋednitsa], lit. 'Bear mountain') is a mountain in central Croatia, just north of Zagreb, and marking the southern border of the historic region of Zagorje. Most of it is encompassed by the Medvednica Nature Park. The highest peak, at 1,035 m (3,396 ft) is Sljeme. Most of the area of Medvednica is a nature park (park prirode), a type of preservation lesser than a national park. During the Miocene and the Pliocene, the mountain was an island within the Pannonian Sea. Together with the surrounding hills, it is known as Zagrebačka gora or the "Zagreb Mountains", as well as Bistranjska gora, Markuševačka gora, Stubička gora and Vrabečka gora.

== Etymology ==
The name Medvednica could be translated as "bear mountain". There are several other toponyms on the mountain using the Kajkavian dialect term medved 'bear' (compare Standard Croatian: medvjed), most notably Medvedgrad, a medieval castle on its southwestern edges.

Sljeme ([sʎême]; Kajkavian: Sleme) means summit, and it is a name often used metonymically to refer to the entire mountain.

== Geology ==
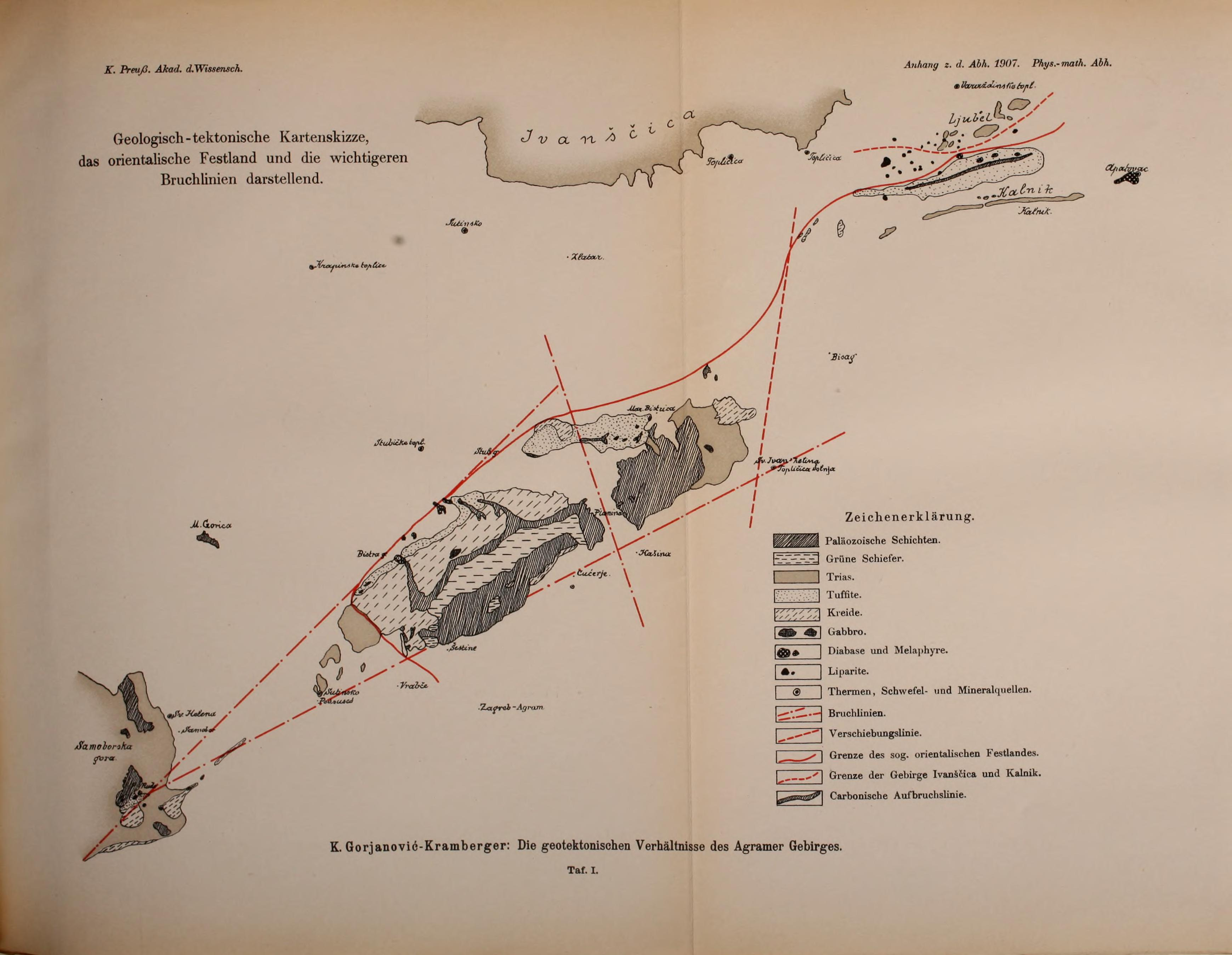
Geological map of Medvednica with Kalnik

The southwest part of Medvednica is dominated by a karst plateau, and there are a number of other karst outcrops on its eastern side, including the 15 square kilometres (5.8 mi^{2}) Horvatove stube area, and smaller ones like Orlove stijene and Markov Travnik. Horvatove stube and some of the other outcrops distinguish themselves by their more prominent karst relief.

A total of 105 dolines have been catalogued on Medvednica, all in the southwest. Doline density averages 7 per km^{2}. There is also one larger karst polje, Ponikve, there are also two smaller poljes, Družanica and Križevščak.

=== Foothills ===
Medvednica has many foothills, including Grmoščica.

=== Speleology ===
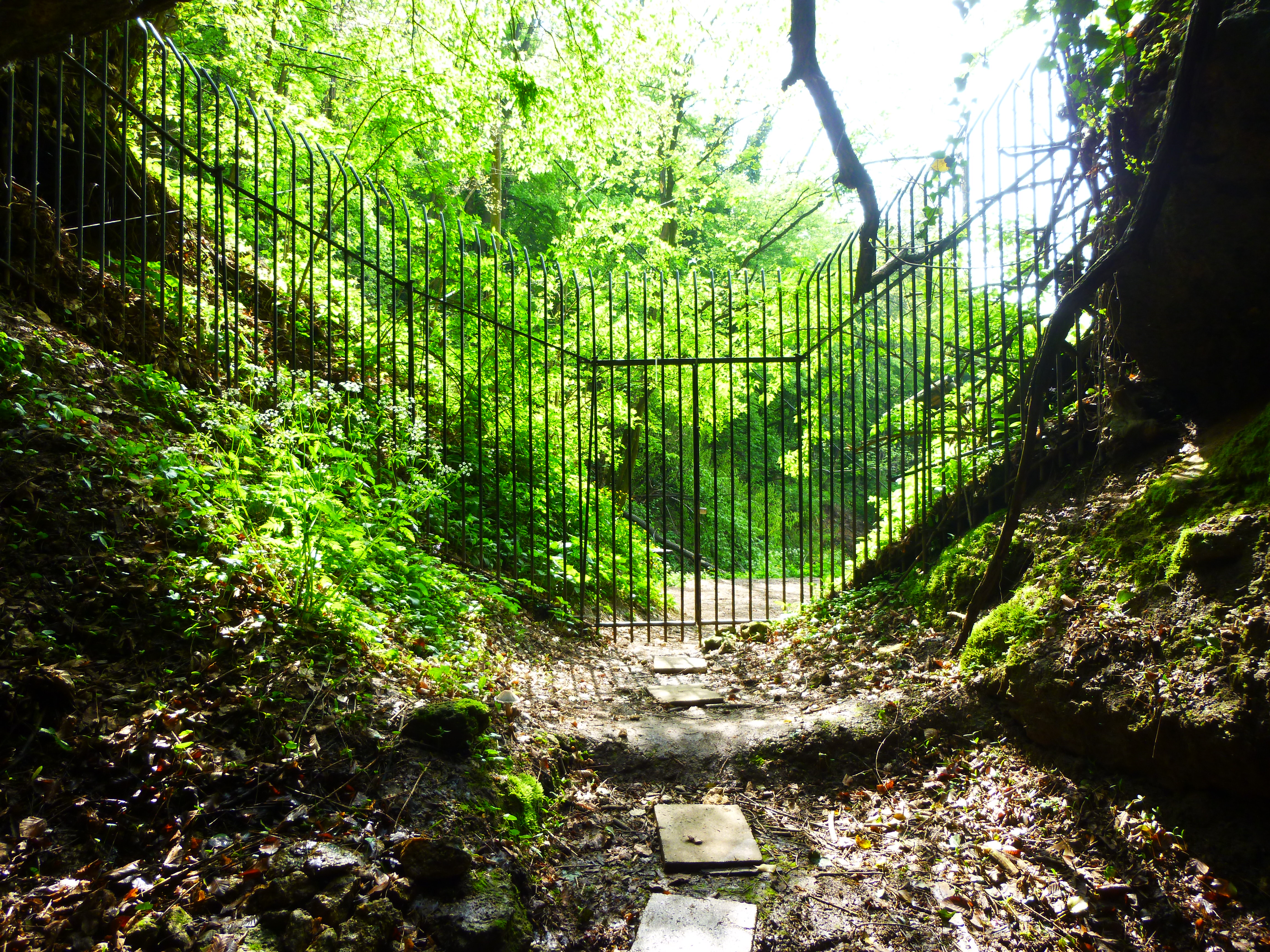
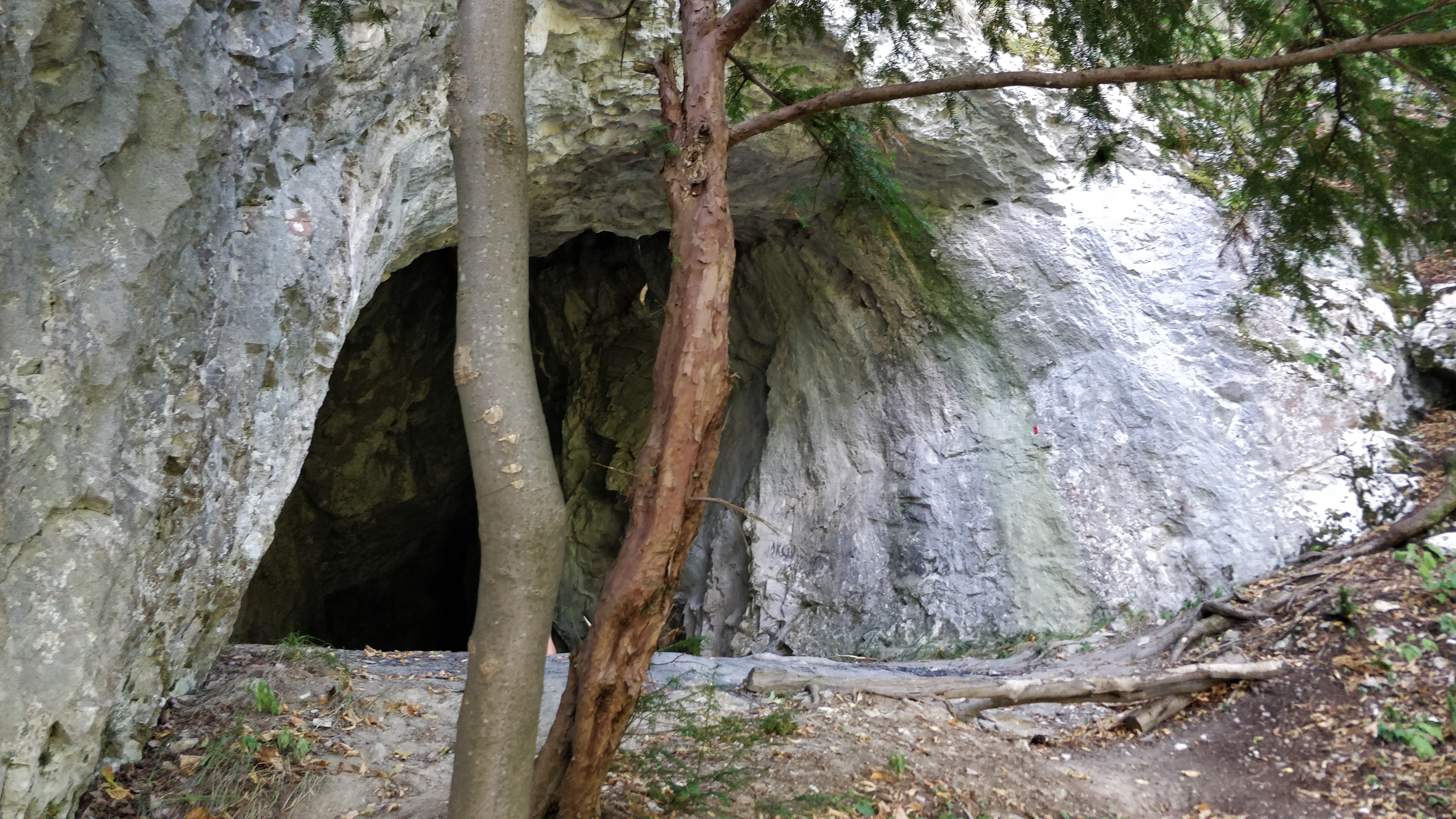
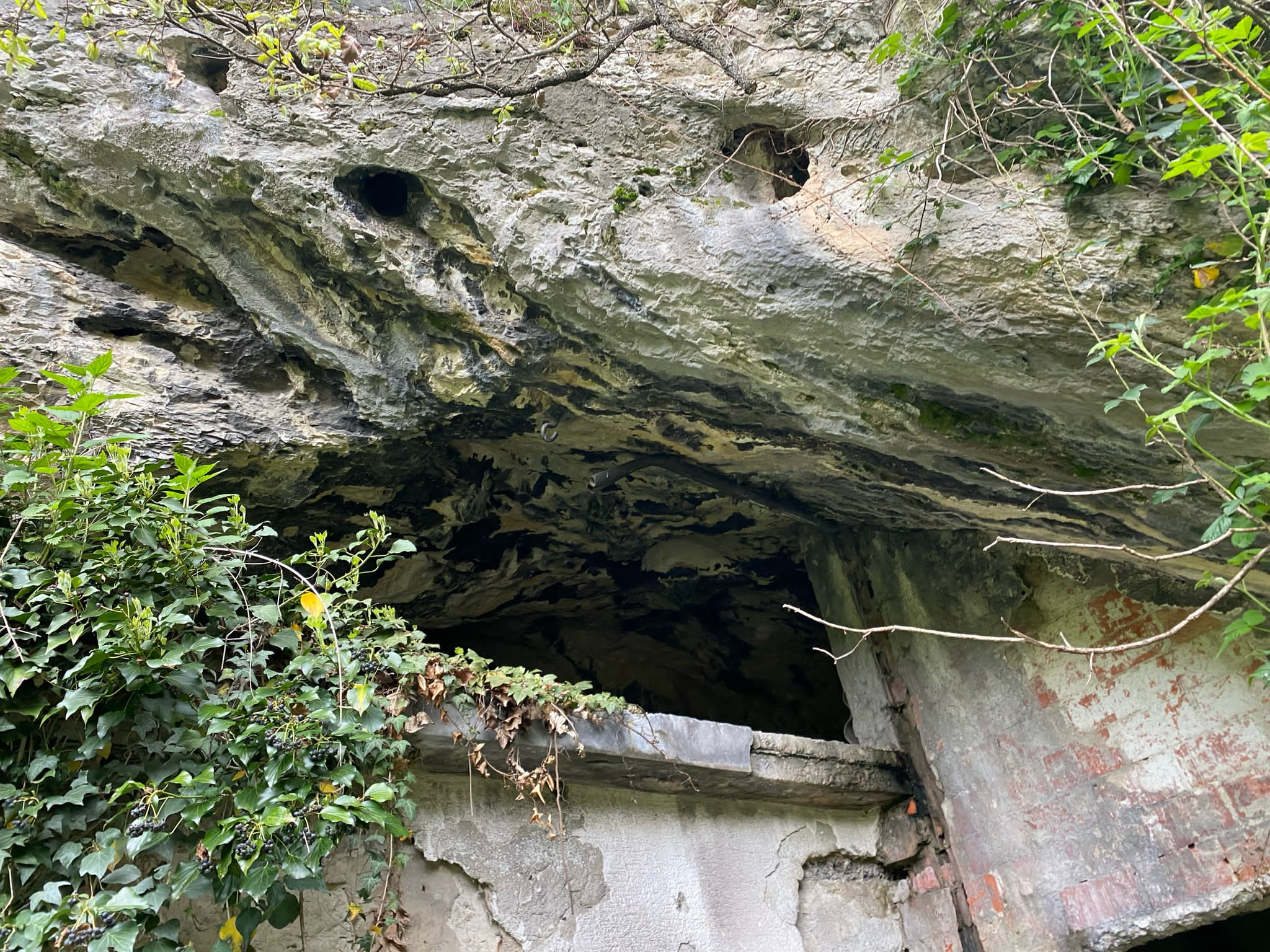
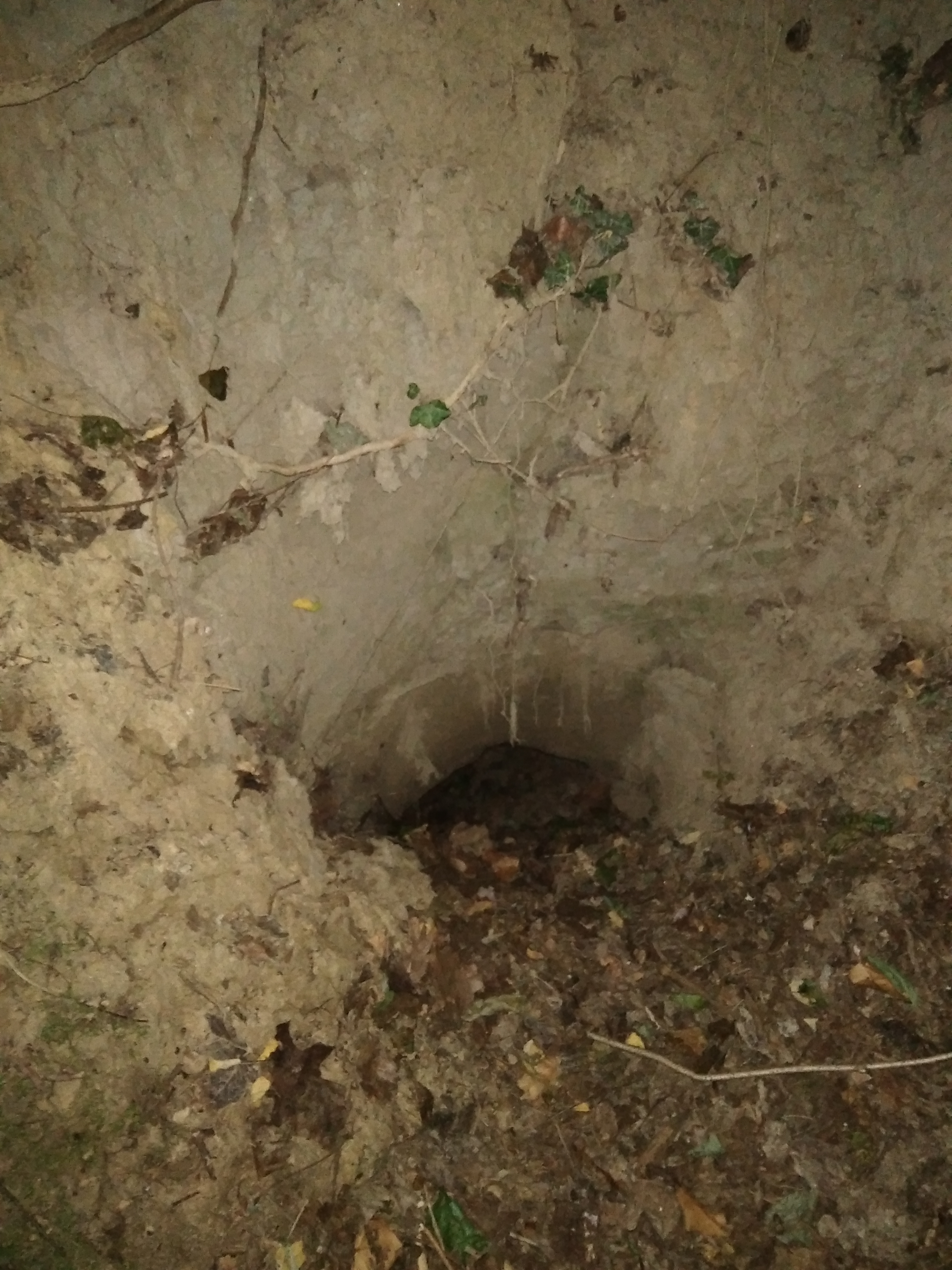
Veternica (upper left), Velika Peć na Rogu (upper right), Šupljasta pećina (lower left), Kustošijanka (lower right)

As of 2011, 64 speleological objects are known to be on Medvednica. Almost 90% of these caves are on the southwest part of the mountain; Srećko Božićević counted 30 there in 1974.

The caves of Medvednica are mostly in upper Tortonian limestone. But there are a few entirely in Middle Triassic dolomite-limestone (i.e. Družanica I), or with entrances in that layer (i.e. Bijele sige, Zakičnica I). A few are entirely in Upper Triassic stromatolitic dolomite (i.e. Zakičnica V). The 7×32 m chamber of the Kolarska pećina formed in Lithothamnion limestone. Exceptionally old is the Carboniferous layer of dolomite in which Velika peć na Rogu, Medvednica's "most imposing entrance", formed. Although most caves are solutional caves, the Kustošijanka cave is of mostly tectonic origin.

The longest cave is Veternica, and other long caves include Javornica kod Bizeka and Židovske jame. While deepest cave from entrance to lowest point is Velebitaška jama at 45 m, the highest vertical elevation difference within a cave is in Veternica at 170 m.

== Hydrology ==
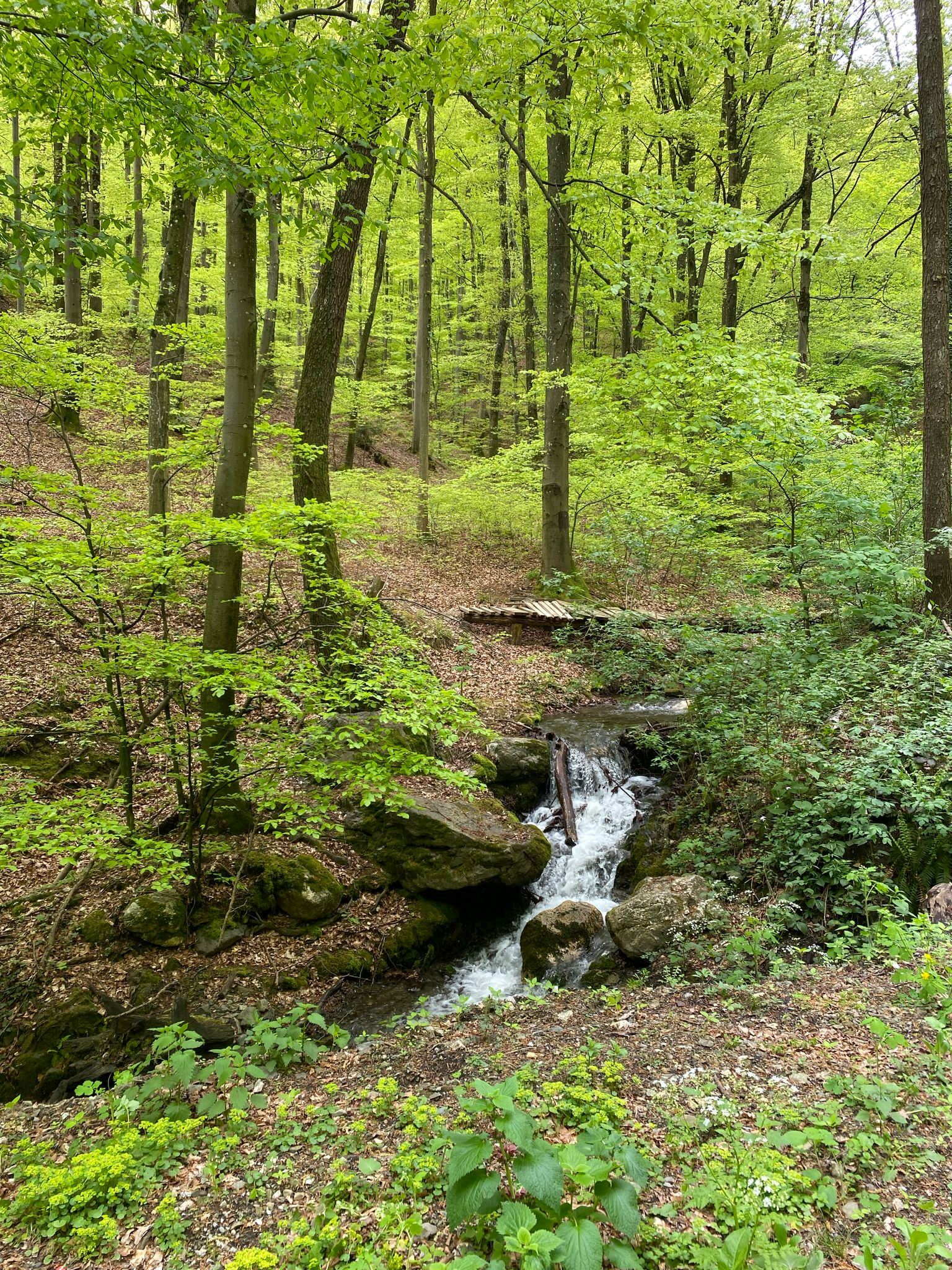
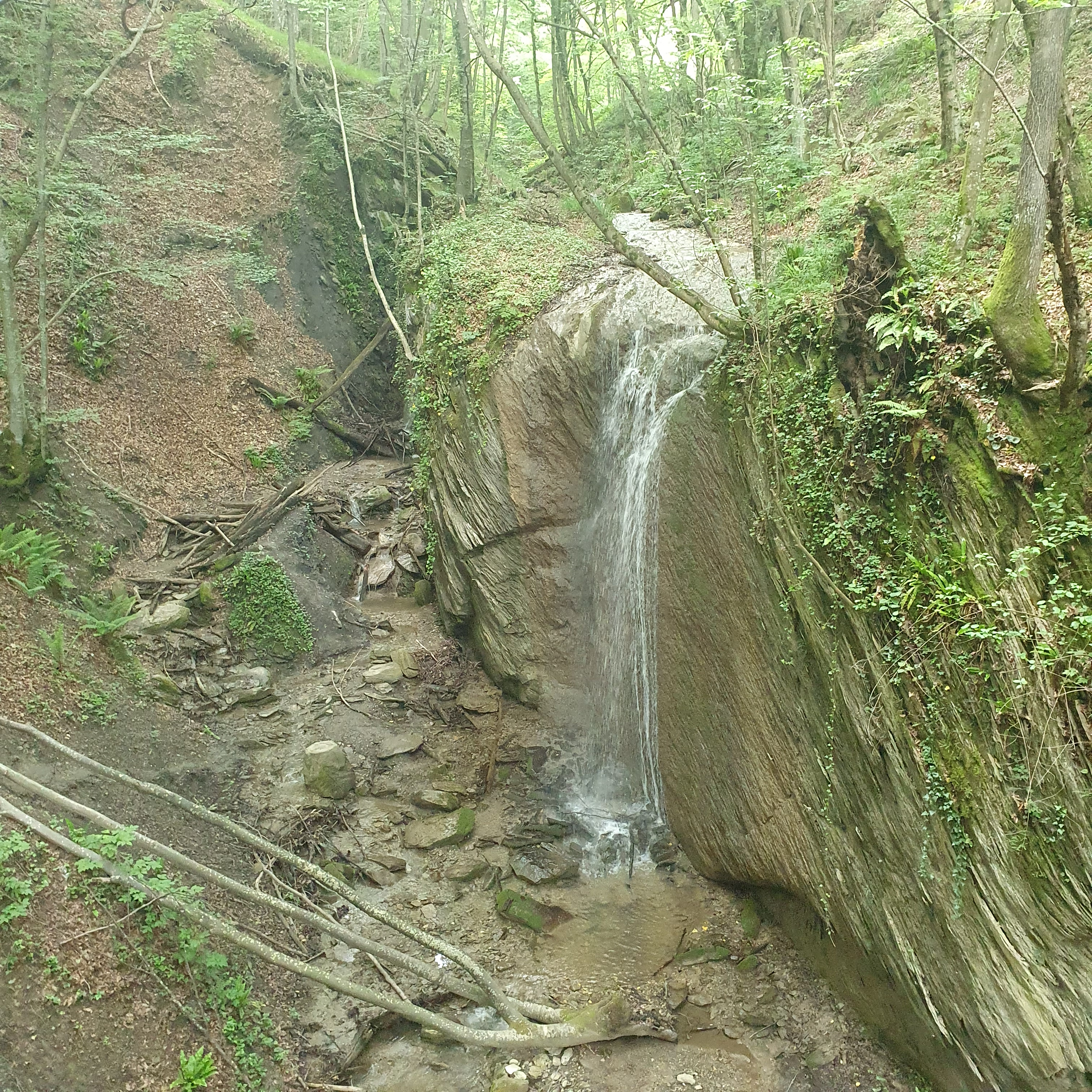
Cascade of Markuševački Potok (left) and Sopot waterfall (right)

Near the ridge there is a 12 m tall cliff of green slate called Šumarev grob, (Note: At 45.901145°N 15.966745°E.) from which one of the springs of the Bliznec flows. The area Bliznec – Šumarev grob was designated a special reserve on 26 November 1963.

== Climate ==
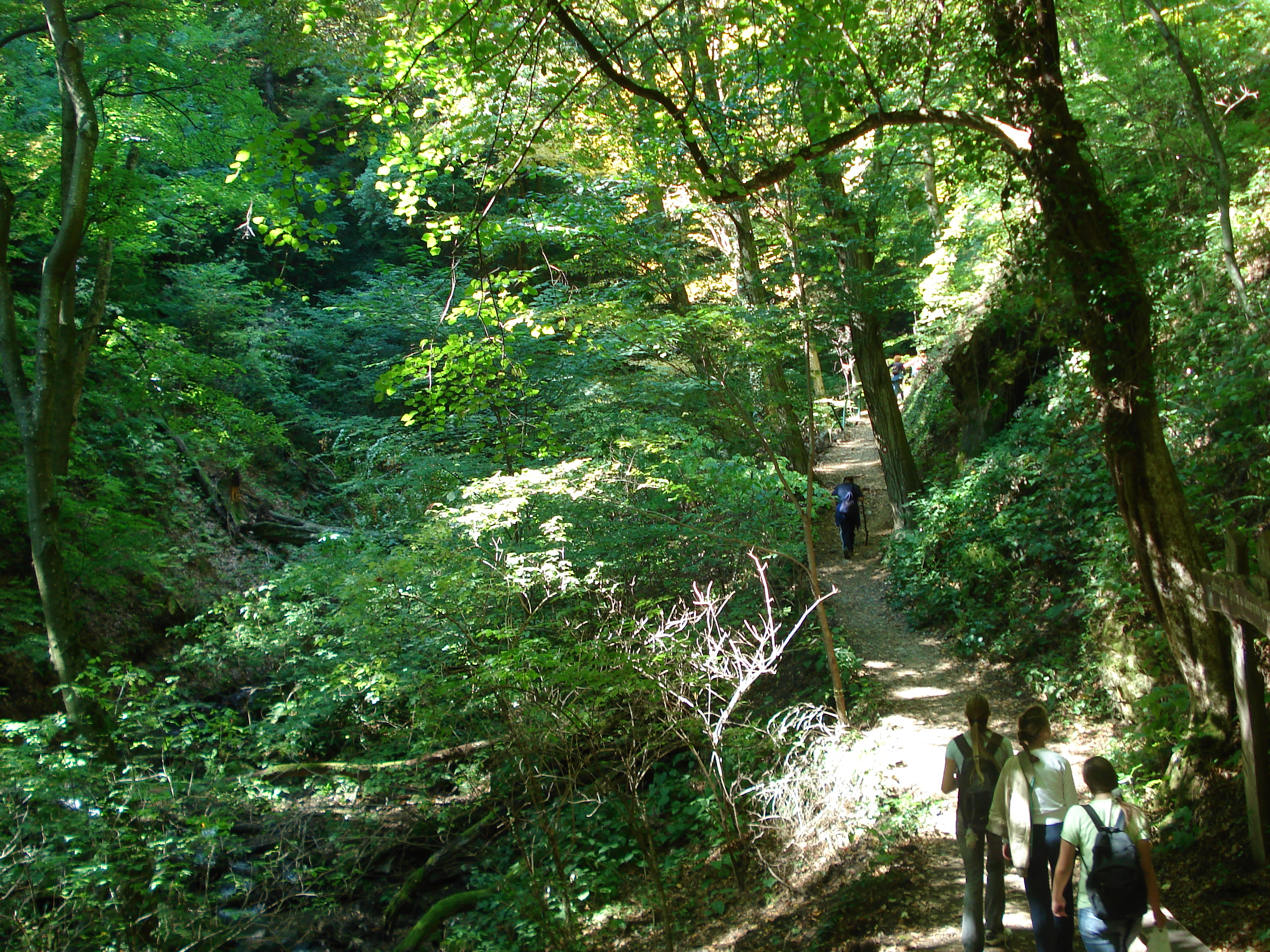
Forest, Park Medvednica, Croatia

The climate of the Medvednica mountain is typical for Central European mountain ranges. The average annual precipitation is around 1300 mm (cf. 840 mm at Zagreb–Grič), which provides for an abundance of rich spring wells. Snow cover lasts for about 100 days in a year, the thickest being in February. The skiing slopes are also covered with artificial snow when necessary. Much more sunshine occurs during the winter on Medvednica than in Zagreb or Zagorje, so it is not surprising that winter is the most visited season on the Medvednica mountain.

Medvednica, in comparison to the surrounding lowland area, behaves as an "island" in its climate characteristics, with more precipitation, lower temperatures, and higher duration and quantity of snow cover. The Medvednica area is located in a temperate zone where air temperature decreases for 0.5 °C for every 100 m of elevation. Based on the annual rate of precipitation, Medvednica is characterised as having a continental precipitation regimen with maximum precipitation during the warm part of the year (April to September).

=== Temperature ===
During summer and winter, temperature inversion is sometimes present. An anticyclone forms above the cold continent during winter. When its center is close to Croatia, the weather is cold and gloomy in Zagreb and warmer at Sljeme. The mean annual air temperature on Medvednica is 6.2 °C (43.2 °F), compared with 11.4 °C (52.5 °F) in Zagreb. The mean temperature in summer months is on average lower by 6 °C (11 °F) than in Zagreb.

On average, 15 days have temperatures below −10 °C (14 °F), eight days a year have average daily maxima higher than 25 °C (77 °F), and only one day reaches above 30 °C (86 °F). The coldest month is January with a mean monthly air temperature of −3.1 °C (26.4 °F), while the warmest month is July with an average temperature of 15.2 °C (59.4 °F). Insolation exceeds Zagreb's by about 100 hours annually. This difference manifests itself during the colder period of the year, from October to March, when more fog occurs in Zagreb.

Since records began in 1981, the highest temperature recorded at the Puntijarka weather station at an elevation of 991 metres (3,251 ft) was 32.3 °C (90.1 °F), on 4 August 2017. The coldest temperature was −20.8 °C (−5.4 °F), on 8 January 1985.

=== Precipitation ===
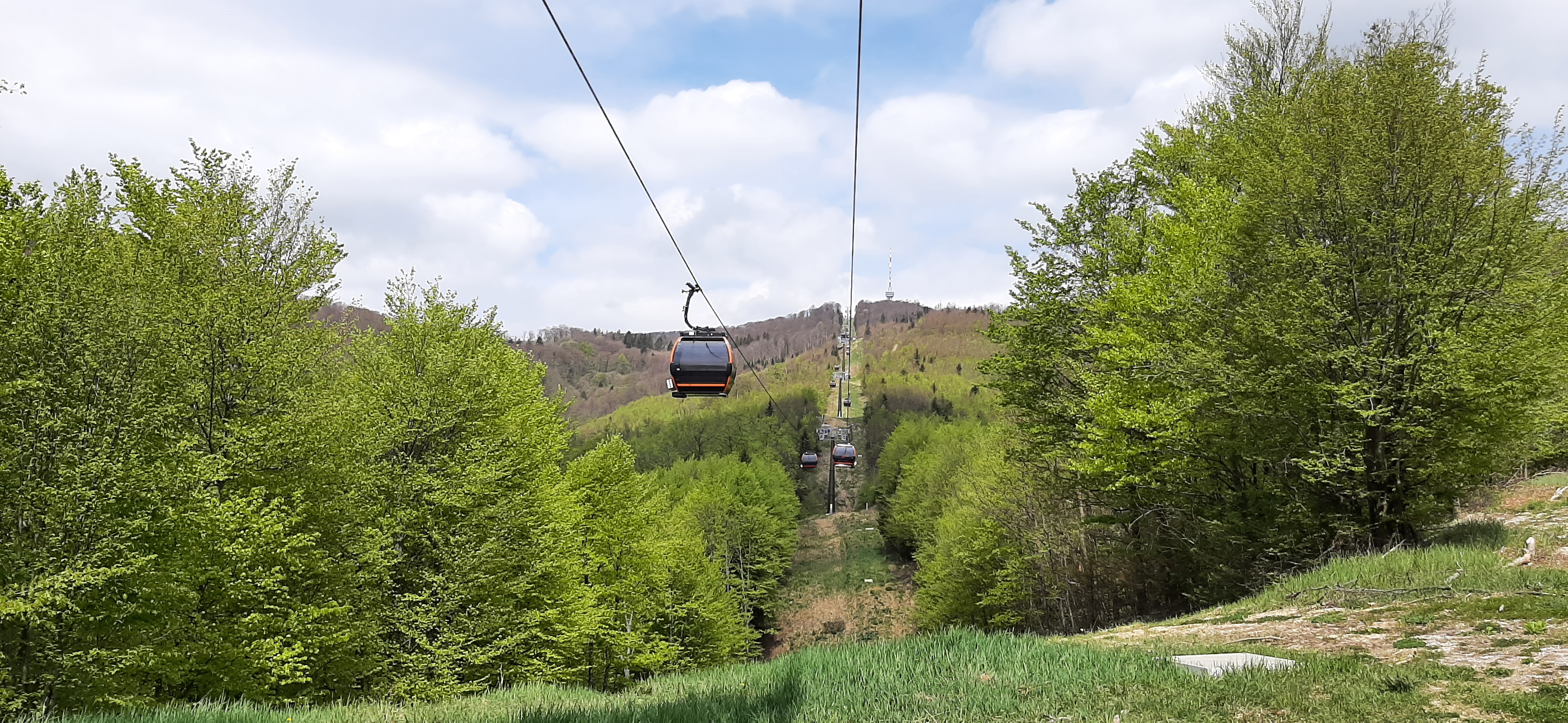
Sljeme cable car

The relative air humidity is largest during the cold part of the year, and generally is larger on stations with higher altitude because of lower temperatures, but luxuriant vegetation. The number of days with relative humidity above 80% is greatest on Puntijarka (158 days annually), and it decreases with the decrease in elevation; for example, at the Zagreb–Grič station it is 67 days annually. On all stations, the warm part of the year (from April to September) has the most thunderstorm days; these are often connected to showers. June has the most thunderstorm days (Puntijarka 7).

The annual precipitation on Medvednica is about 50% higher in comparison to Zagreb (Zagreb: 844 mm (33.2 in), Sljeme: 1,238 mm (48.7 in), Kraljičin zdenac: 1,159 mm (45.6 in), Fakultetsko dobro: 1,142 mm (45.0 in)). Average number of days with hoar is 40 (4 in Zagreb). The mean annual number of days with snowfall on the top of Medvednica, most usually in January and February, is 54 days.

The number of days with strong wind is 91 (26 in Zagreb) and they are more frequent during the cold part of the year. The number of days with storm-force wind is 21 (2 in Zagreb), also mostly during the cold part of the year. In 1980, the forests of Medvednica, especially beech trees, were heavily stricken by a catastrophic ice break. Later, in February 1983, large devastations occurred as a result of strong wind (large damage on fir). Effects of such a strong wind can be seen in the area of Adolfovac as of early 2010s.

== Ecology ==
The dominant association in the forest is Epimedio carpinetum-betuli at lower elevations, Lamio orvalae-Fagetum at middle elevations, and Festuco drymeiae-Abietetum at higher elevations. The associations Querco-Castaneetum sativae and Luzulo-Fagetum also have a significant presence. Rarer associations include Luzulo luzuloidi-Quercetum, Hieracio racemosi-Quercetum, Tilio-Taxetum, Blechno-Fagetum, Chrysanthemo acrophylli-Aceretum pseudoplatani, Ostryo-Quercetum pubescentis, and Carici brizoides-Alnetum glutinosae.

== Flora ==
Being adjacent to a capital city, Medvednica is subject to a high rate of colonization by invasive species, including Robinia pseudoacacia.

== Demographics ==
=== Settlements ===
Zagrebačka gora is divided administratively between the City of Zagreb, Zagreb County and Krapina-Zagorje County. On the level of municipalities and districts, it is divided into Bedenica, Bistra, Črnomerec, Donja Stubica, Gornja Dubrava, Gornja Stubica, Gornji Grad–Medveščak, Hrašćina, Jakovlje, Konjščina, Maksimir, Marija Bistrica, Oroslavje, Podsljeme, Podsused-Vrapče, Sesvete, Sveti Ivan Zelina and Zaprešić. On the level of villages and quarters, it is divided into:

- Adamovec
- Andraševec
- Belovar
- Banšćica
- Berislavec
- Biškupec
- Blaguša
- Blaškovec
- Blaževdol
- Breg
- Brezovec
- Budenec
- Bukevje
- Bukovec Zagrebački
- Bukovec Zelinski
- Bunjak
- Curkovec
- Črečan
- Dobrodol
- Donja Bistra
- Donja Drenova
- Donja Topličica
- Donja Zelina
- Donje Orešje
- Donje Psarjevo
- Dotrščina
- Dubovec Bisaški
- Dubovec Selnički
- Đurđekovec
- Filipovići
- Gajec
- Glavnica Donja
- Glavnica Gornja
- Goranec
- Goričanec
- Goričica
- Gornja Bistra
- Gornja Drenova
- Gornja Topličica
- Gornje Orešje
- Gornje Psarjevo
- Gradec
- Gusakovec
- Hrastje
- Hrnjanec
- Hruševec
- Igrišće
- Ivanec
- Jablanovec
- Jelenščak
- Jesenovec
- Kalinje
- Kaptol
- Kašina
- Kašinska Sopnica
- Keleminovec
- Kladešćica
- Komin
- Kozjak
- Kraljev Vrh
- Kraljevečki Novaki
- Križevčec
- Krušljevo Selo
- Kučilovina
- Lašćina
- Laz Bistrički
- Laz Stubički
- Lepa Ves
- Lužan
- Majkovec
- Marinovec
- Markovo Polje
- Markuševec
- Medveščak
- Modrovec
- Mokrica
- Mokrice
- Moravče
- Nespeš
- Novaki Bistranski
- Novakovec
- Obrež
- Paruževina
- Pila
- Planina Donja
- Podgorje
- Podgrađe
- Poljanica Bistranska
- Poljanica Bistrička
- Popovec
- Prekvršje
- Prepolno
- Prepuštovec
- Pretoki
- Remete
- Ribnjak
- Samci
- Selnica Bistrička
- Selnica Psarjevačka
- Soblinec
- Slatina
- Strmec Stubički
- Suhodol
- Sušobreg
- Sveta Helena
- Sveti Matej
- Šalata
- Šalovec
- Šašinovec
- Šimunčevec
- Šulinec
- Šurdovec
- Tugonica
- Turkovčina
- Tuškanac
- Velika Gora
- Vrapče
- Vugrovec Donji
- Vugrovec Gornji
- Vukovje
- Vurnovec
- Zadrkovec
- Žerjavinec
- Žitomir

== Skiing ==
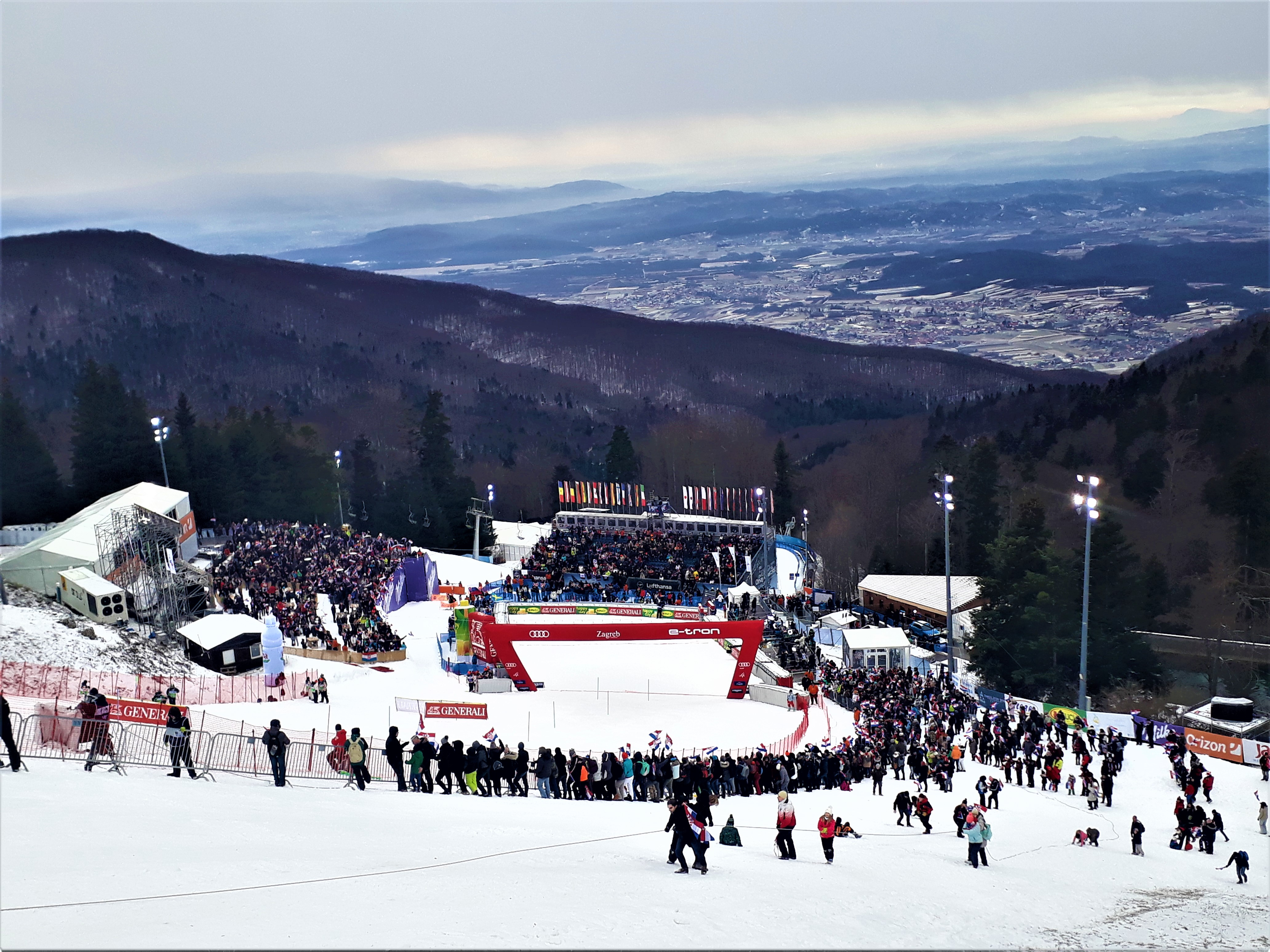
Snow Queen Trophy

A winter sports center is based on the northern slopes towards Sljeme. The center has hosted several FIS World Cup slalom skiing races, known as the Snow Queen Trophy.

The winter sports center consists of one chairlift for three persons and two T-bar lifts. Equipment for producing artificial snow has been added, and because of that, the skiing season has been prolonged to more than four months.

Three ways exist to reach the mountain: by road (with a car or a bus) or on foot (numerous mountain paths). In the past, an older gondola lift was present, which started from the Gračani neighborhood just below Medvednica. The cable car had run from 1963 to 2007, when a major fault in the engine room made repairs economically impossible. The gondola had a capacity for four people, with a 23-minute journey time, covering a distance of 4023 m. The new gondola lift was opened on 23 February 2022, has a capacity of 10 people and WiFi.

On Medvednica are dozen of mountain huts for traditional one-day trips to the mountain. Because of its proximity to Zagreb, Medvednica has many visitors, especially during weekends.

== Mountain huts ==
The Tomislavov Dom mountain hut, at 1,012 metres (3,320 ft) in elevation, opened on 31 December 1935. This replaced a temporary hut at 950 metres (3,120 ft). The temporary hut was open all year roud and in the season of Tomislavov Dom's opening, the temporary hut saw 1345 visitors, including 14 Czechoslovak, 9 German and 8 Austrian citizens. In the 1936–1937 season, Tomislavov Dom saw 5138 visitors, including 19 Bulgarian, 19 German, 14 Czechoslovak, 6 Austrian, 6 English and 1 Polish citizens; the temporary shelter under caretaker Mirko Petanjek saw 1933 visitors, including 5 Czechoslovak and 2 Austrian citizens. In the 1937–1938 season, Tomislavov Dom saw 4841 visitors, including 16 Austrian, 9 German, 8 Czechoslovak, 6 English, 4 Bulgarian, 2 Polish and 1 French citizens; the temporary shelter under caretaker Petanjek saw 1885 visitors, including 3 Czechoslovak, 2 German and 1 English citizens.

== Views of Medvednica ==
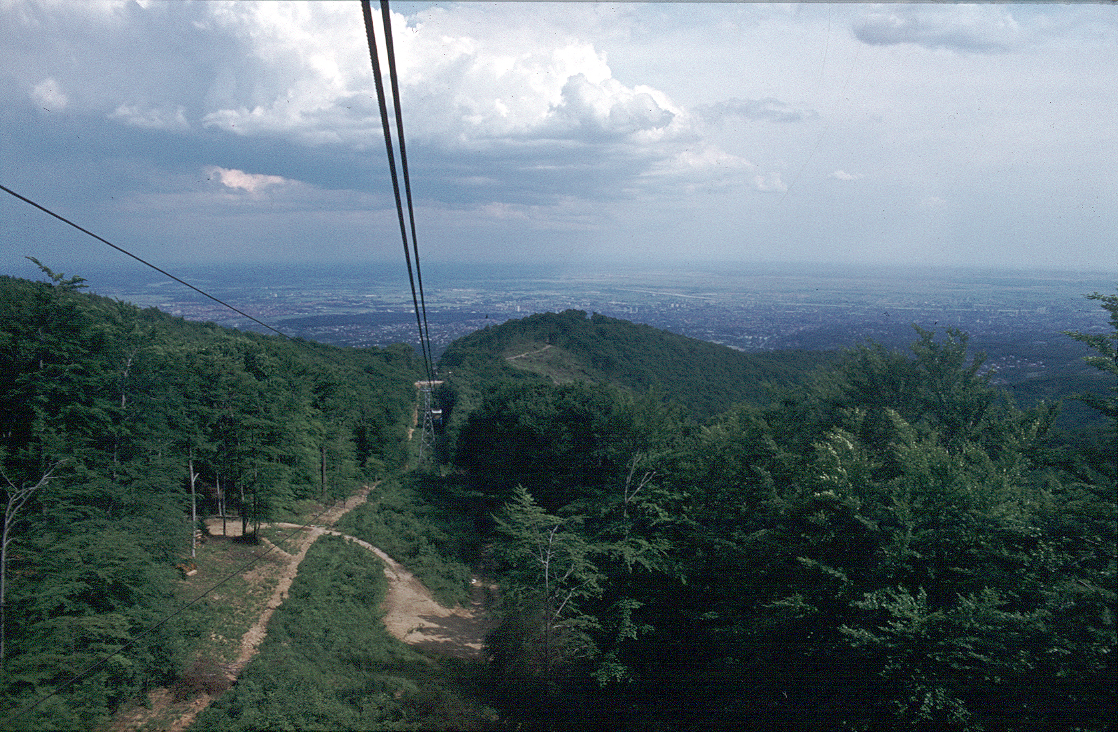
View of Zagreb from Sljeme

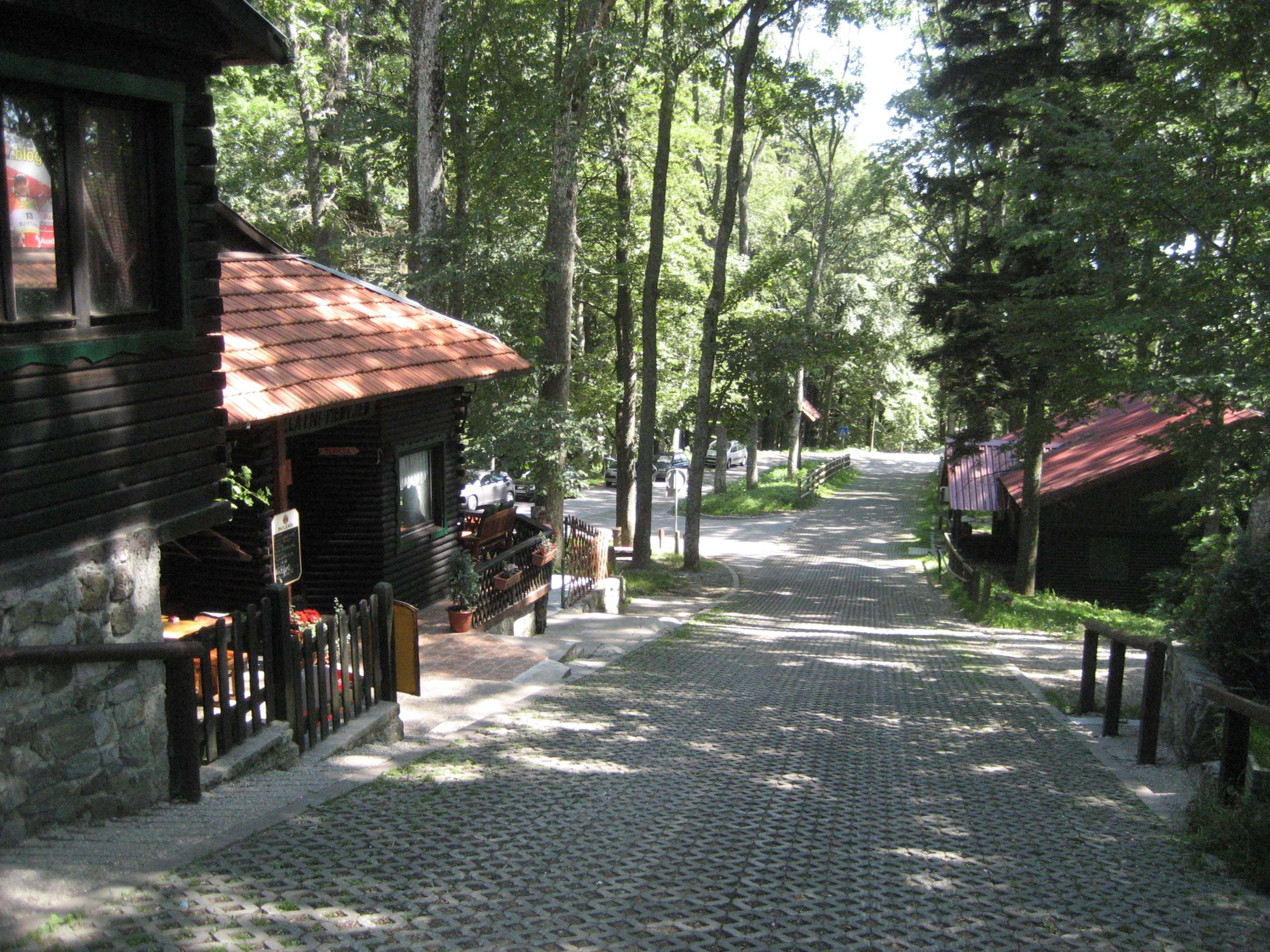
Ski clubs' houses and restaurants near the summit

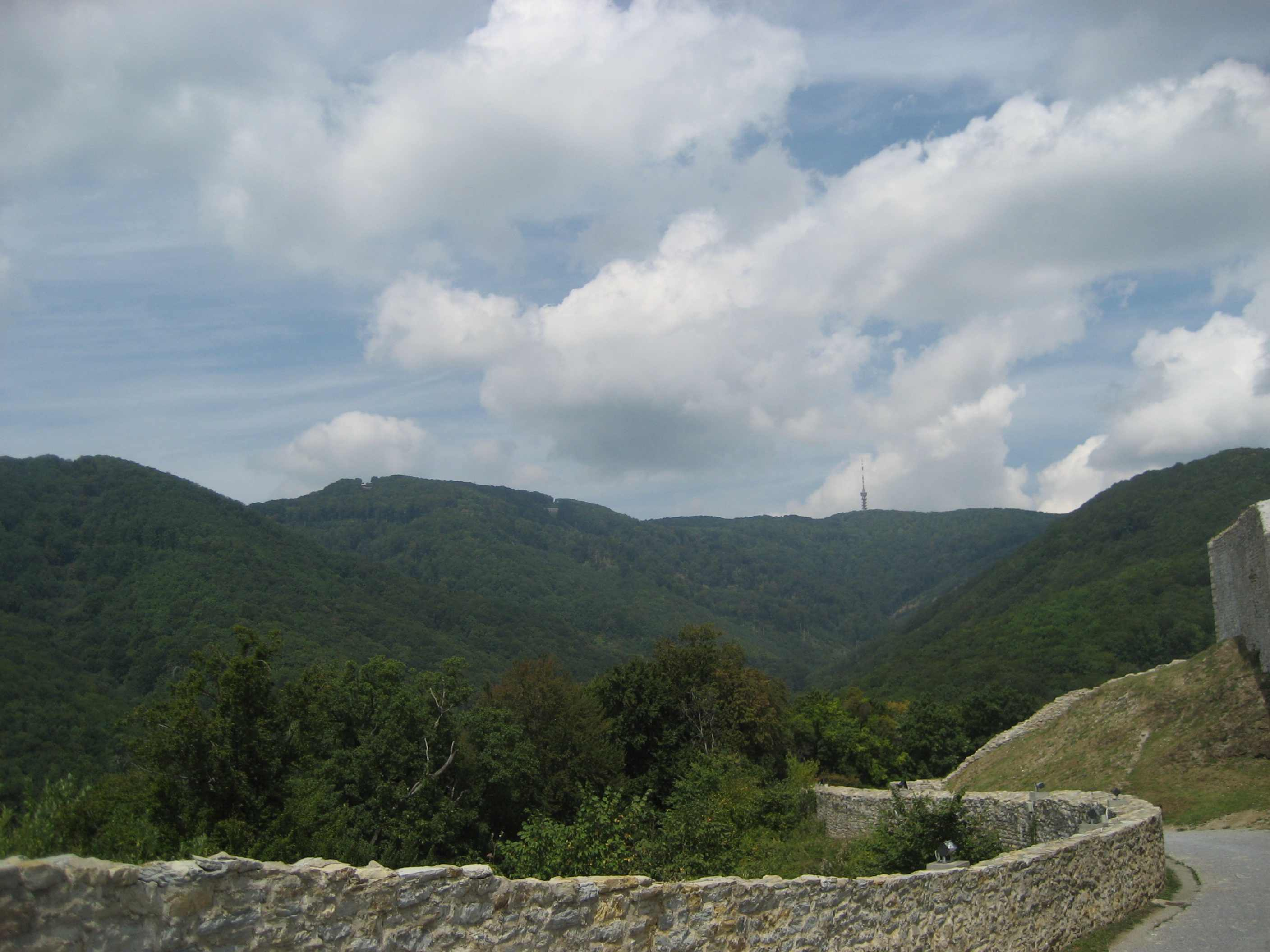
Sljeme with the TV tower seen from Medvedgrad castle

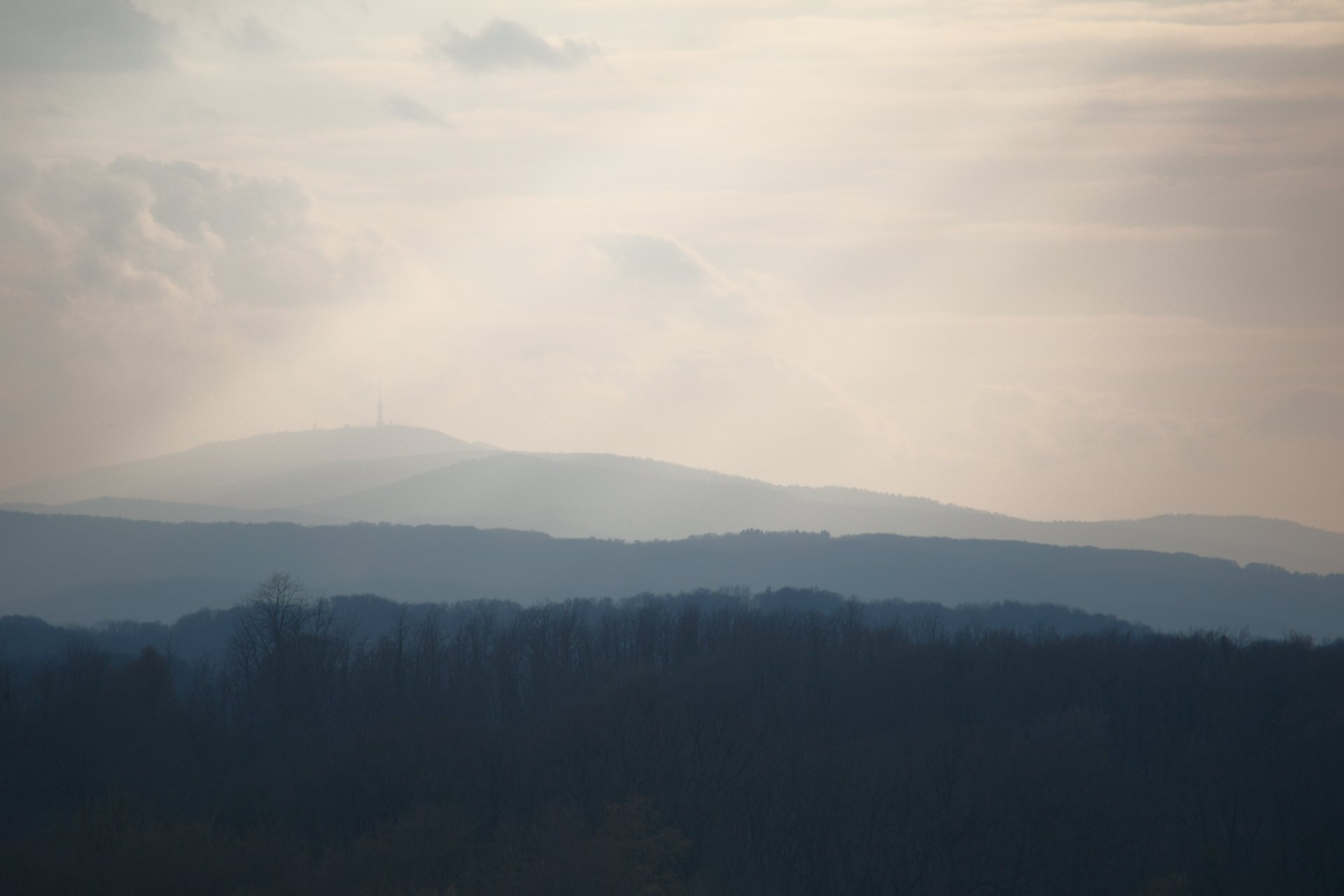
Medvednica seen from Zagorje

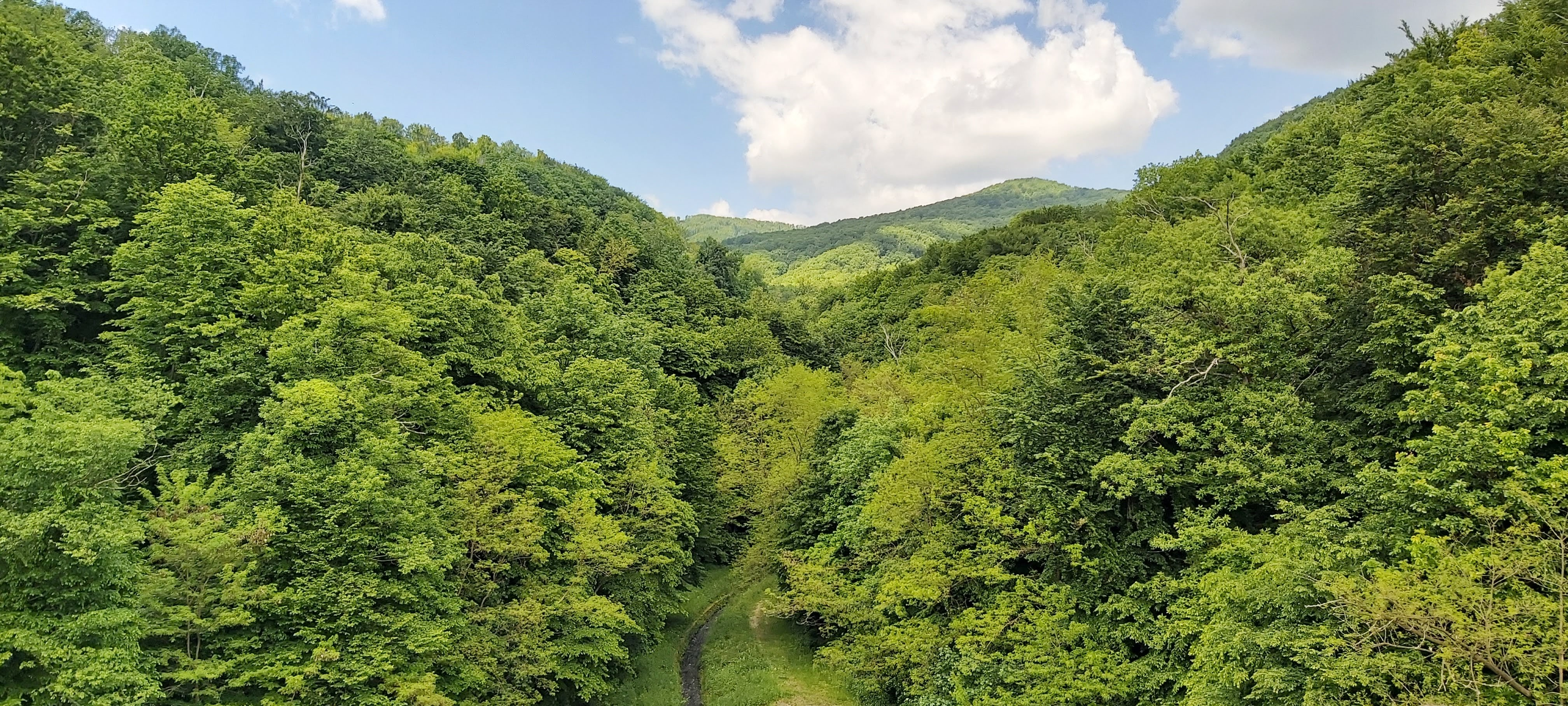
Nature Park Medvednica

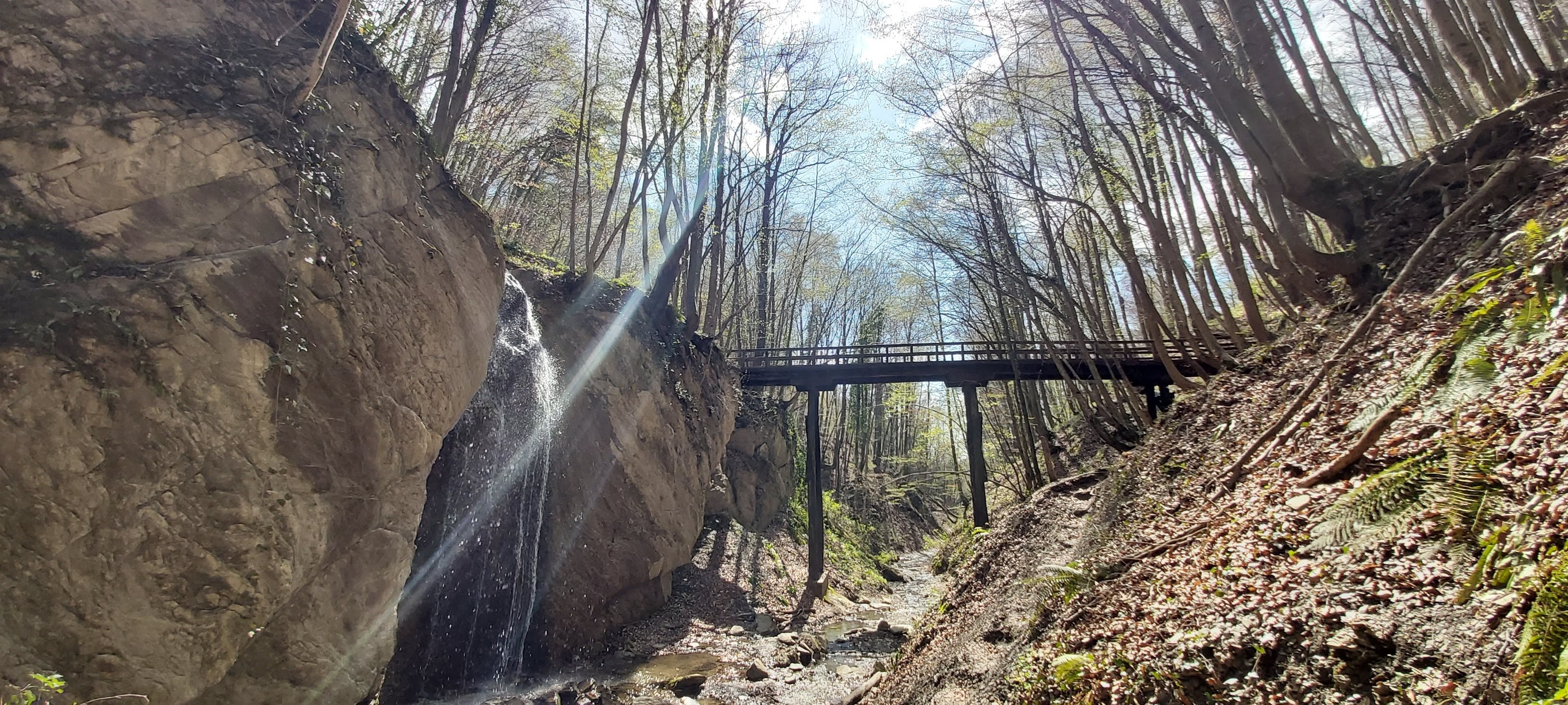
Waterfalls

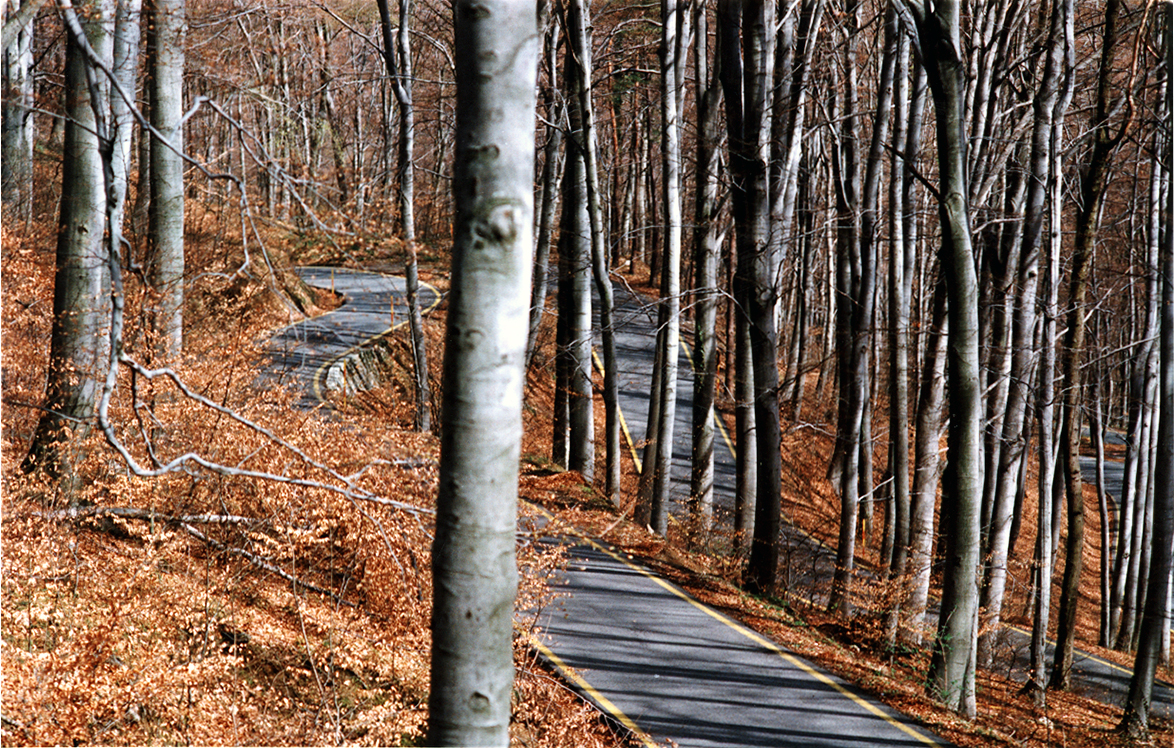
Road to Sljeme

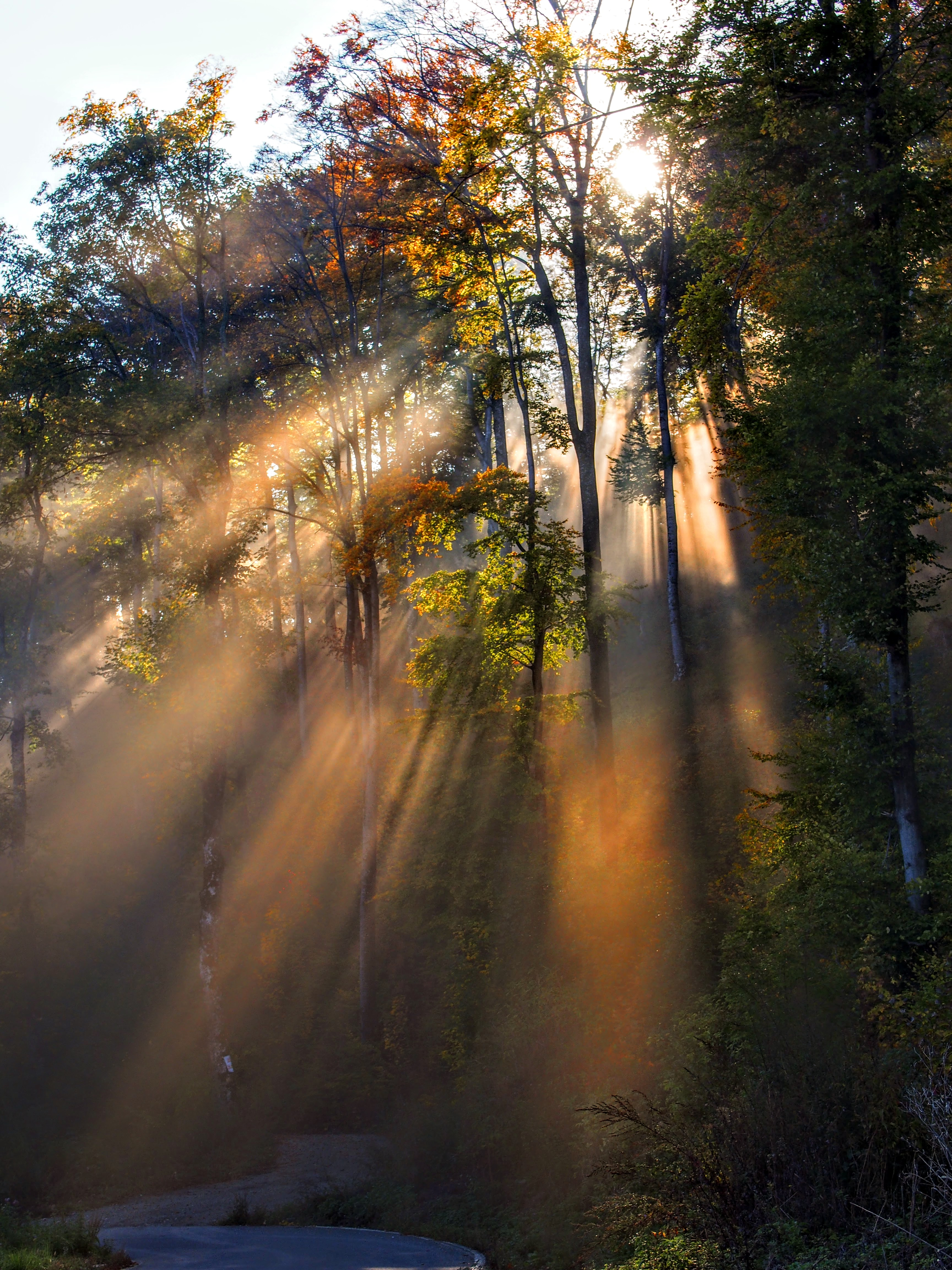
Light from the sun

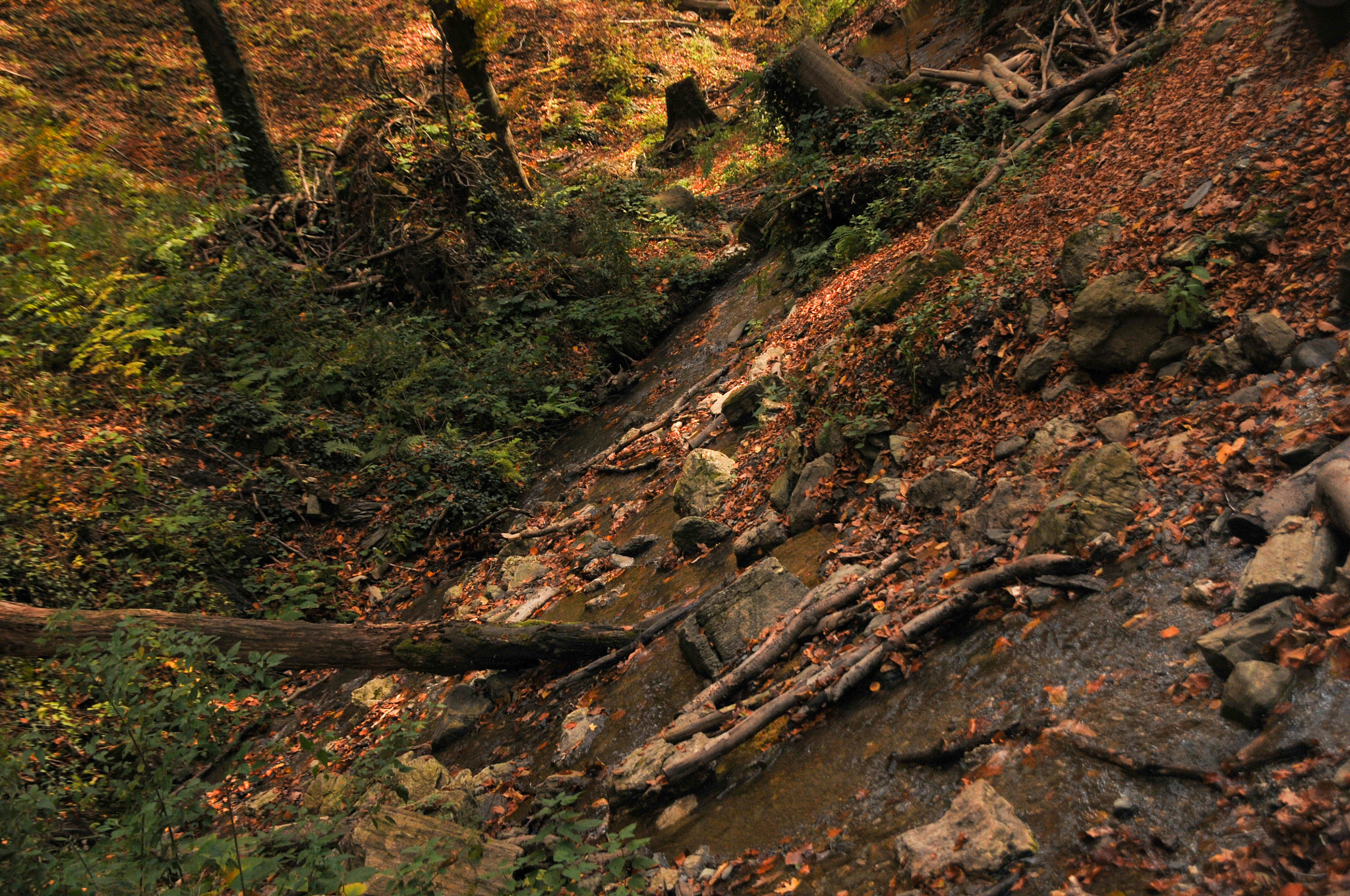
Autumn

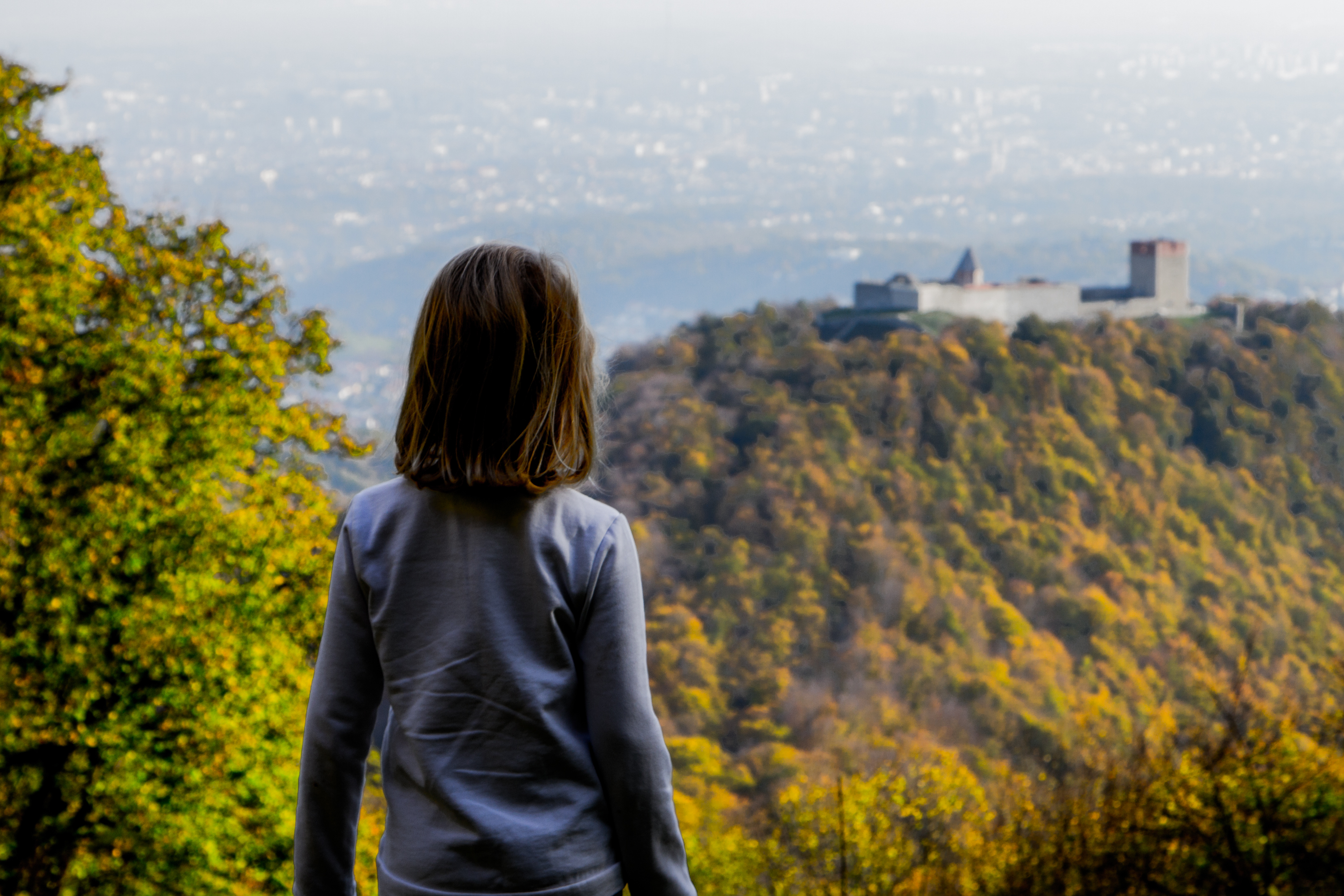
View at Medvedgrad

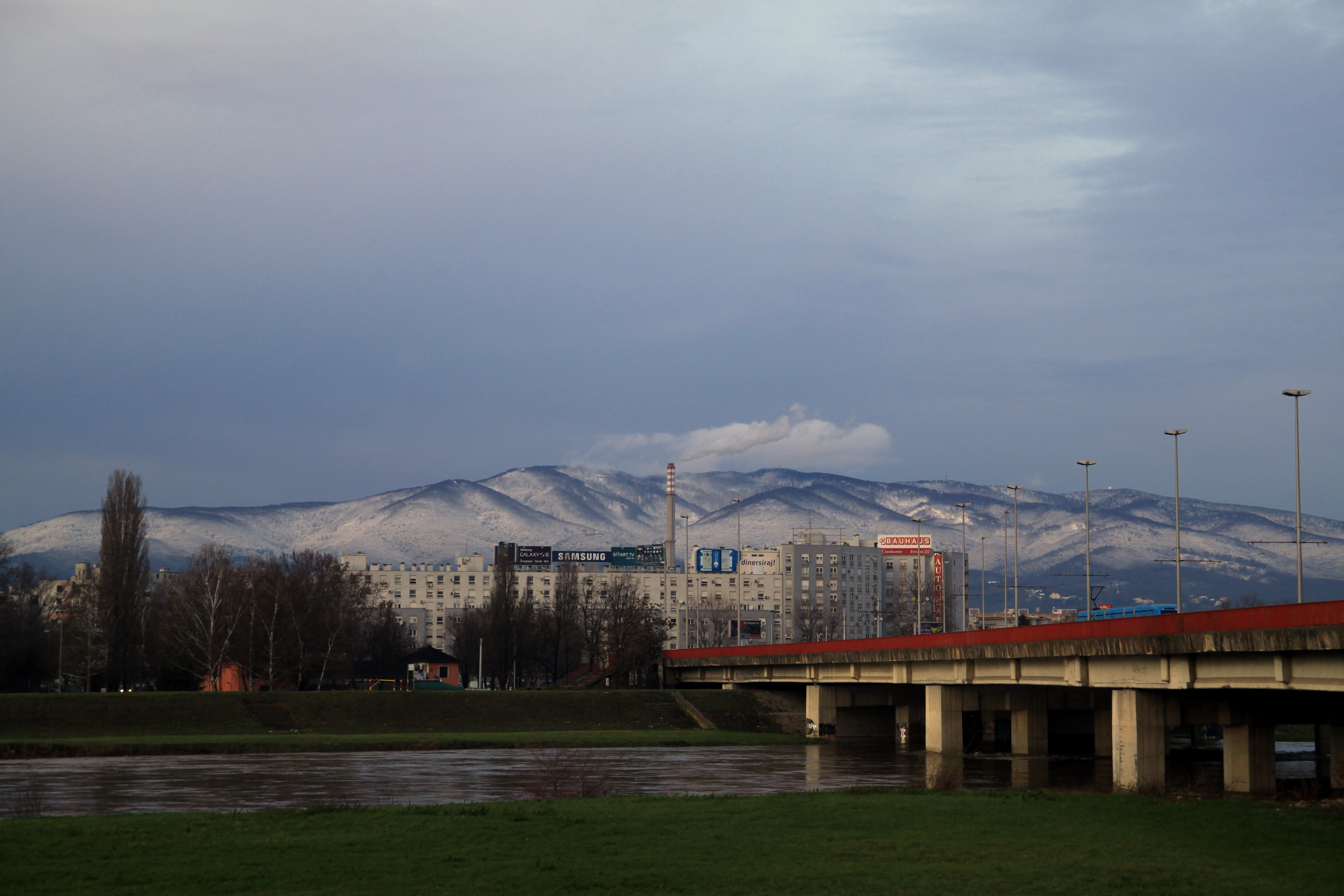
Snow covering the mountain

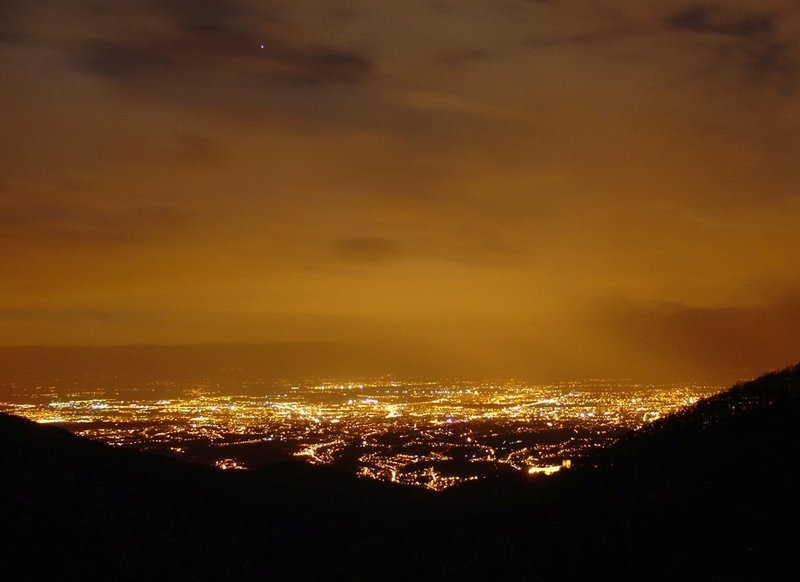
View of Zagreb at night from Medvednica

== Selected works ==
=== Hydrology ===
- Martinić, Ivan (2024-12-16). Hidrološka i geomorfološka obilježja izvora prisojne strane Parka prirode Medvednica [Hydrological and geomorphological characteristics of springs on the south side of the Medvednica Nature park] (Thesis) (in Croatian). Zagreb: Prirodoslovno-matematički fakultet Sveučilišta u Zagrebu.
