= Topličica =

Topličica may refer to:

- Topličica, Varaždin County, a village near Novi Marof
- Topličica, Krapina-Zagorje County, a village near Budinšćina
- Gornja Topličica, a village near Sveti Ivan Zelina
- Donja Topličica, a village near Sveti Ivan Zelina
