= Črečan =

Črečan may refer to:

- Črečan, Međimurje County, a village near Čakovec, Croatia
- Črečan, Zagreb County, a village near Sveti Ivan Zelina, Croatia
