= Villa Rebar =

Ruined hunting lodge near Zagreb, Croatia

Coordinates: 45.8634786°N 15.9789434°E

Villa Rebar is a ruined hunting lodge from 1932 located on Medvednica mountain, near Zagreb, Croatia. It was known as the residence of Croatian WWII politician Ante Pavelić. During World War II. Pavelić built a system of tunnels that connected the manor to military bunkers in the nearby hills, as well as some that acted as escape tunnels.

After the war, Pavelić fled, and the villa was eventually remodelled and turned into a mountain resort called "Risnjak". A fire in 1979 razed the manor to its stone foundations. After this disaster, the property, along with its tunnels, were simply abandoned.

The above ground foundations of the home remain to this day, overgrown and marred with graffiti. Urban explorers have also taken to tagging up the tunnels beneath the estate. However, exploring the tunnels beneath the ruins of Pavelić's former mansion is not recommended.
