= Pyrri =

Pyrri was an ancient Roman settlement in Pannonia, located on the road that had connected Poetovio (today's Ptuj) in the north and Siscia (Sisak) to the south. It is believed that its location is near today's village of Komin, near Sveti Ivan Zelina, Zagreb County, Croatia.

== Sources ==
- Petrić, Hrvoje (October 1993). "Prilog poznavanju srednjovjekovnih puteva u središnjoj Hrvatskoj". Journal - Institute of Croatian History (in Croatian). 26 (1).
