= Gornja Drenova =

Gornja Drenova can refer to:

- Gornja Drenova, Croatia, a village near Sveti Ivan Zelina, Croatia
- Gornja Drenova, Serbia, a town near Prijepolje, Serbia
