= Polonje Tomaševečko =

Coordinates: 45°58′N 16°18′E

- Settlement
- Location within Croatia
- Country: Croatia
- County: Zagreb
- City: Sveti Ivan Zelina

Area
  - Total: 2.0 km^{2} (0.77 sq mi)

Population (2021)
  - Total: 50
  - Density: 25/km^{2} (65/sq mi)
- Time zone: UTC+1 (CET)
  - Summer (DST): UTC+2 (CEST)

Polonje Tomaševečko is a settlement (naselje) in the Sveti Ivan Zelina administrative territory of Zagreb County, Croatia. As of 2011 it had a population of 42 people.
