= Bedenica =

- Municipality
- Municipality of Bedenica
- Interactive map of Bedenica
- Location of Bedenica in Croatia
- Country: Croatia
- County: Zagreb County

Area
  - Municipality: 21.5 km^{2} (8.3 sq mi)
  - Urban: 8.3 km^{2} (3.2 sq mi)

Population (2021)
  - Municipality: 1,266
  - Density: 58.9/km^{2} (153/sq mi)
  - Urban: 483
  - Urban density: 58/km^{2} (150/sq mi)
- Time zone: UTC+1 (Central European Time)
- Vehicle registration: ZG
- Website: bedenica.hr

Bedenica is a village and a municipality in Zagreb County, Croatia. It is located near the town of Sveti Ivan Zelina.

The municipality has 1,432 inhabitants, absolute majority of which are Croats. There are a total of six settlements ("naselja") in the municipality:

- Bedenica - 555
- Beloslavec - 263
- Bosna - 97
- Omamno - 151
- Otrčkovec - 32
- Turkovčina - 334
