= Zrinšćina =

Coordinates: 46°00′N 16°21′E

- Settlement
- Location within Croatia
- Country: Croatia
- County: Zagreb
- City: Sveti Ivan Zelina

Area
  - Total: 4.3 km^{2} (1.7 sq mi)

Population (2021)
  - Total: 122
  - Density: 28/km^{2} (73/sq mi)
- Time zone: UTC+1 (CET)
  - Summer (DST): UTC+2 (CEST)

Zrinšćina is a settlement (naselje) in the Sveti Ivan Zelina administrative territory of Zagreb County, Croatia. As of 2011 it had a population of 126 people.
