= Gornji Vinkovec =

- Settlement
- Location within Croatia
- Coordinates: 45°59′13″N 16°20′21″E
- Country: Croatia
- County: Zagreb
- City: Sveti Ivan Zelina

Area
  - Total: 2.5 km^{2} (0.97 sq mi)

Population (2021)
  - Total: 54
  - Density: 22/km^{2} (56/sq mi)
- Time zone: UTC+1 (CET)
  - Summer (DST): UTC+2 (CEST)

Gornji Vinkovec is a settlement (naselje) in the Sveti Ivan Zelina administrative territory of Zagreb County, Croatia. As of 2011 it had a population of 66 people.
