= Novo Mjesto =

Coordinates: 45°57′N 16°17′E

- Settlement
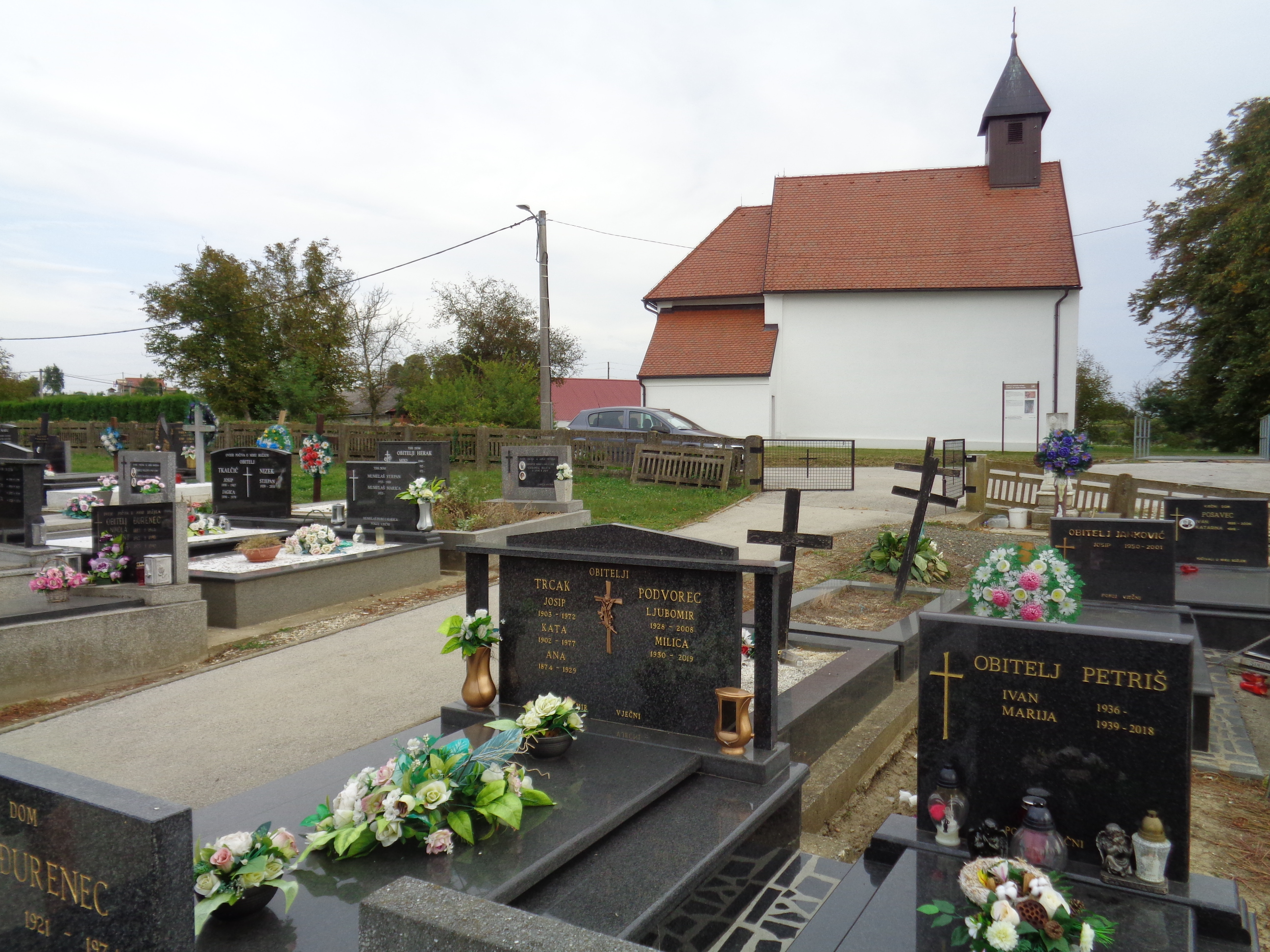
- Cemetery in Novo Mjesto

- Location within Croatia
- Country: Croatia
- County: Zagreb
- City: Sveti Ivan Zelina

Area
  - Total: 4.4 km^{2} (1.7 sq mi)

Population (2021)
  - Total: 143
  - Density: 33/km^{2} (84/sq mi)
- Time zone: UTC+1 (CET)
  - Summer (DST): UTC+2 (CEST)

Novo Mjesto is a settlement (naselje) in the Sveti Ivan Zelina administrative territory of Zagreb County, Croatia. As of 2011 it had a population of 147 people.
