= Polonje =

Coordinates: 45°57′58″N 16°18′00″E

- Village
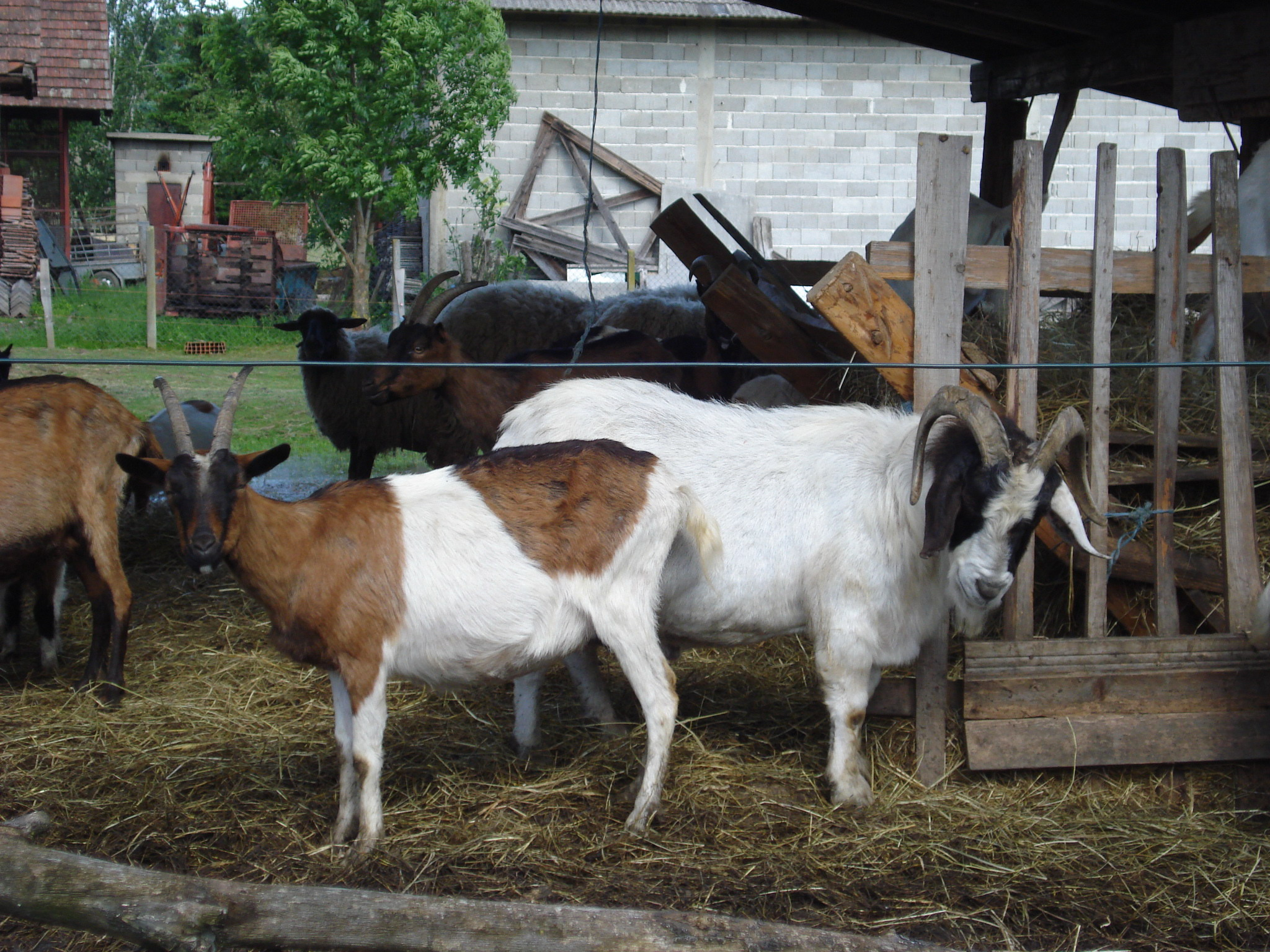
- A female and a male goat on a farm in Polonje
- Interactive map of Polonje
- Country: Croatia

Area
  - Total: 0.73 sq mi (1.9 km^{2})

Population (2021)
  - Total: 312
  - Density: 430/sq mi (160/km^{2})
- Time zone: UTC+1 (CET)
  - Summer (DST): UTC+2 (CEST)

Polonje is a village in Sveti Ivan Zelina municipality, Croatia. At the 2011 census, its population was 344.
