= Curkovec =

- Settlement
- Location within Croatia
- Coordinates: 45°54′04″N 16°10′52″E
- Country: Croatia
- County: Zagreb
- City: Sveti Ivan Zelina

Area
  - Total: 4.2 km^{2} (1.6 sq mi)
- Elevation: 90 m (300 ft)

Population (2021)
  - Total: 69
  - Density: 16/km^{2} (43/sq mi)
- Time zone: UTC+1 (CET)
  - Summer (DST): UTC+2 (CEST)
- Postal code: 10380 St. Ivan Zelina
- Area code: 385 (0) 1

Curkovec is a settlement (naselje) in the Sveti Ivan Zelina administrative territory of Zagreb County, Croatia. As of 2011 it had a population of 88 people.
