= Majkovec =

Coordinates: 45°53′N 16°17′E

- Settlement
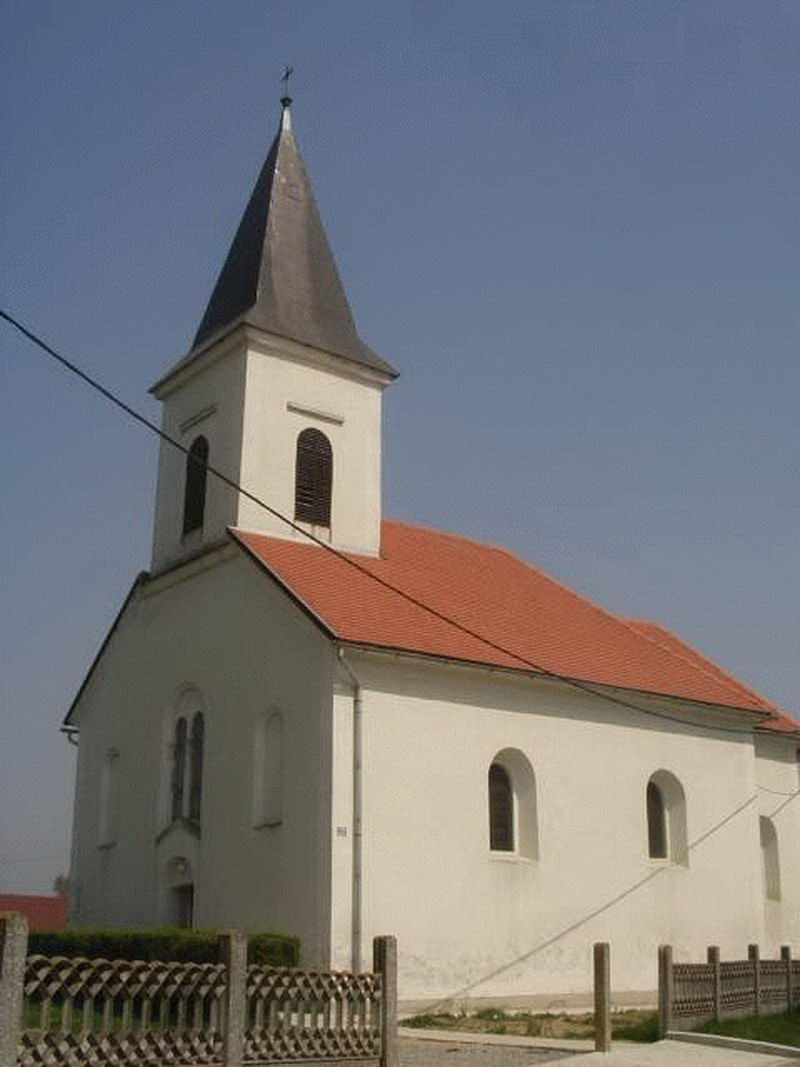
- Chapel in the village

- Location within Croatia
- Country: Croatia
- County: Zagreb
- City: Sveti Ivan Zelina

Area
  - Total: 4.3 km^{2} (1.7 sq mi)

Population (2021)
  - Total: 190
  - Density: 44/km^{2} (110/sq mi)
- Time zone: UTC+1 (CET)
  - Summer (DST): UTC+2 (CEST)

Majkovec is a settlement (naselje) in the Sveti Ivan Zelina administrative territory of Zagreb County, Croatia. As of 2011 it had a population of 194 people.
