= Obrež Zelinski =

- Settlement
- Interactive map of Obrež Zelinski
- Location within Croatia
- Coordinates: 45.9344°N 16.261°E
- Country: Croatia
- County: Zagreb
- City: Sveti Ivan Zelina

Area
  - Total: 4.5 km^{2} (1.7 sq mi)

Population (2021)
  - Total: 61
  - Density: 14/km^{2} (35/sq mi)
- Time zone: UTC+1 (CET)
  - Summer (DST): UTC+2 (CEST)

Obrež Zelinski is a settlement (naselje) in the Sveti Ivan Zelina administrative territory of Zagreb County, Croatia. As of 2011 it had a population of 64 people.
