= Blaževdol =

- Settlement
- Location of Blaževdol within Croatia
- Coordinates: 45°56′N 16°14′E
- Country: Croatia
- County: Zagreb County
- Municipality: Sveti Ivan Zelina

Area
  - Total: 3.3 km^{2} (1.3 sq mi)

Population (2021)
  - Total: 374
  - Density: 110/km^{2} (290/sq mi)
- Time zone: UTC+1 (CET)
  - Summer (DST): UTC+2 (CEST)
- Postal code: 10380 Sveti Ivan Zelina

Blaževdol is a village in Croatia. It is connected by the D3 highway.
