= Filipovići, Croatia =

Filipovići
- Village
- Location within Croatia
- Coordinates: 45.993896°N 16.27175°E
- Country: Croatia
- County: Zagreb County
- Municipality: Sveti Ivan Zelina

Area
  - Total: 0.8 km^{2} (0.31 sq mi)

Population (2021)
  - Total: 73
  - Density: 91/km^{2} (240/sq mi)
- Time zone: UTC+1 (CET)
  - Summer (DST): UTC+2 (CEST)

Filipovići is a village in Croatia. It is connected by the D3 highway.
