= Šalovec =

Coordinates: 45°59′N 16°16′E

- Settlement
- Location within Croatia
- Country: Croatia
- County: Zagreb
- City: Sveti Ivan Zelina

Area
  - Total: 1.2 km^{2} (0.46 sq mi)

Population (2021)
  - Total: 156
  - Density: 130/km^{2} (340/sq mi)
- Time zone: UTC+1 (CET)
  - Summer (DST): UTC+2 (CEST)

Šalovec (formerly in German Schalowetz) is a settlement (naselje) in the Sveti Ivan Zelina administrative territory of Zagreb County, Croatia. As of 2011 it had a population of 169 people.
