= Gornje Psarjevo =

- Location within Croatia
- Coordinates: 45.956933°N 16.204618°E
- Country: Croatia
- County: Zagreb County
- City: Sveti Ivan Zelina

Area
  - Total: 7.8 km^{2} (3.0 sq mi)

Population (2021)
  - Total: 419
  - Density: 54/km^{2} (140/sq mi)
- Time zone: UTC+1 (CET)
  - Summer (DST): UTC+2 (CEST)

Gornje Psarjevo is a village in central Croatia, located south of Sveti Ivan Zelina. The population is 311 (census 2011).
