= Gornje Orešje =

Coordinates: 46°01′N 16°13′E

- Settlement
- Location within Croatia
- Country: Croatia
- County: Zagreb
- City: Sveti Ivan Zelina

Area
  - Total: 5.5 km^{2} (2.1 sq mi)

Population (2021)
  - Total: 226
  - Density: 41/km^{2} (110/sq mi)
- Time zone: UTC+1 (CET)
  - Summer (DST): UTC+2 (CEST)

Gornje Orešje is a settlement (naselje) in the Sveti Ivan Zelina administrative territory of Zagreb County, Croatia. As of 2011 it had a population of 251 people.
