= Donje Orešje =

- Village
- Location within Croatia
- Coordinates: 46°00′N 16°15′E
- Country: Croatia
- County: Zagreb County
- Municipality: Sveti Ivan Zelina

Area
  - Total: 6.4 km^{2} (2.5 sq mi)

Population (2021)
  - Total: 446
  - Density: 70/km^{2} (180/sq mi)
- Time zone: UTC+1 (CET)
  - Summer (DST): UTC+2 (CEST)

Donje Orešje is a village in Croatia. It is located in the Sveti Ivan Zelina municipality, which is part of the Zagreb County.
