= Sveti Ivan Zelina =

- Town
- Grad Sveti Ivan Zelina; Town of Sveti Ivan Zelina
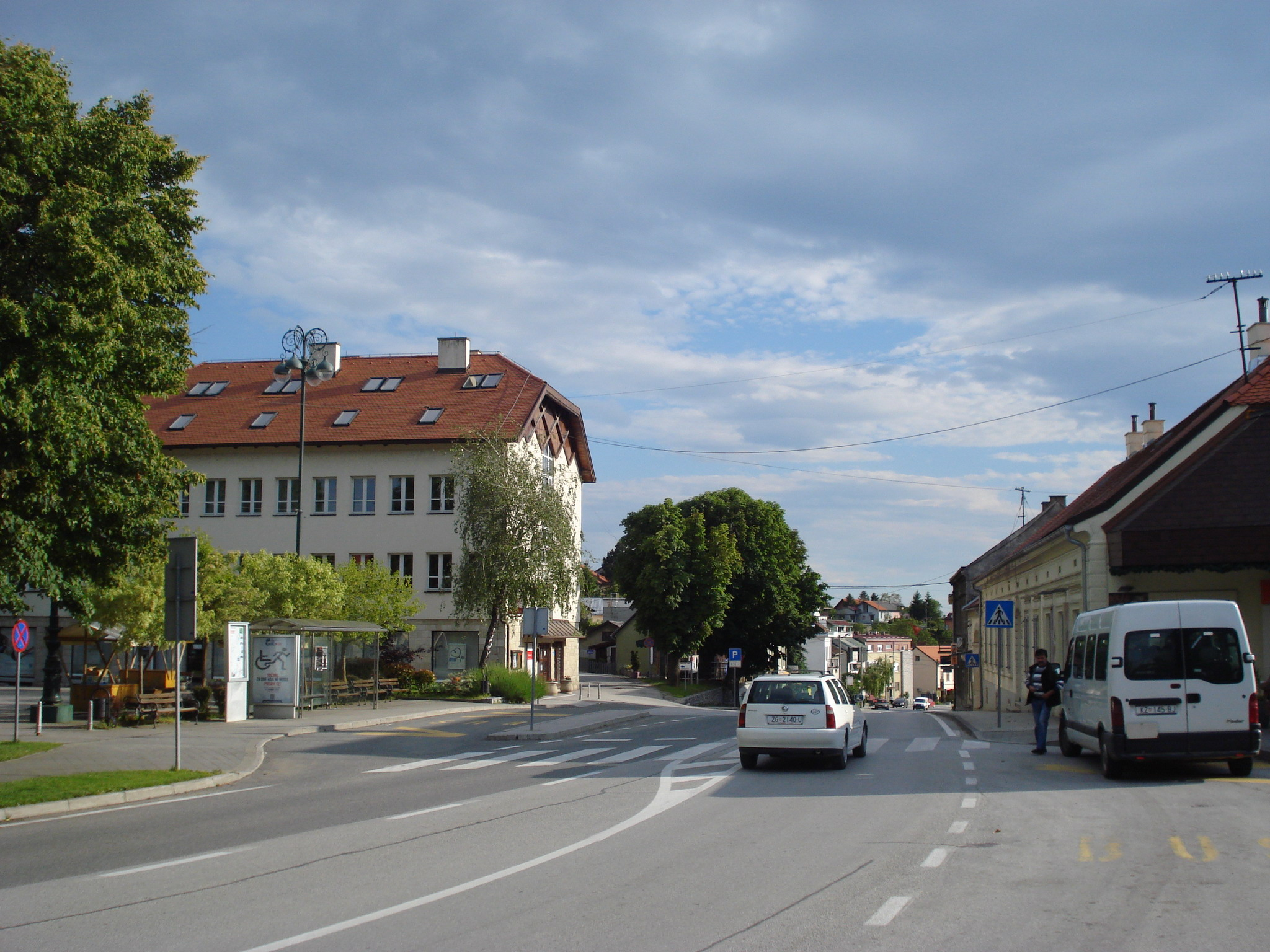
- Sveti Ivan Zelina town center

- Flag Coat of arms
- Nickname: Zelina
- Interactive map of Sveti Ivan Zelina
- Location of Sveti Ivan Zelina within Croatia
- Coordinates: 45°57′34.6428″N 16°14′35.0226″E
- Country: Croatia
- Region: Central Croatia (Prigorje)
- County: Zagreb County

Government
  - Mayor: Hrvoje Košćec (Fokus)

Area
  - Town: 185.9 km^{2} (71.8 sq mi)
  - Urban: 4.0 km^{2} (1.5 sq mi)

Population (2021)
  - Town: 14,602
  - Density: 78.55/km^{2} (203.4/sq mi)
  - Urban: 2,583
  - Urban density: 650/km^{2} (1,700/sq mi)
- Time zone: UTC+1 (CET)
  - Summer (DST): UTC+2 (CEST)
- Area code: +385 (0) 1
- Website: zelina.hr

Sveti Ivan Zelina (Croatian pronunciation: [svêːtiː ǐvan zělina]) is a town in Zagreb County, Croatia.

== Geography ==
Sveti Ivan Zelina is north-east from Zagreb, connected:

- 27 km (17 mi) by A4 highway (Zagreb - Sv.Helena), then state road Sv.Helena - Sveti Ivan Zelina,

== Climate ==
Since records began in 1981, the highest temperature recorded at the local weather station was 38.2 °C (100.8 °F), on 24 August 2012. The coldest temperature was −21.0 °C (−5.8 °F), on 12 February 1985.

== Population ==
In the 2011 Croatian census, the total population of the administrative territory of Sveti Ivan Zelina was 15,959, divided in the following settlements:

- Banje Selo, population 106
- Berislavec, population 46
- Biškupec Zelinski, population 988
- Blaškovec, population 577
- Blaževdol, population 433
- Breg Mokrički, population 45
- Brezovec Zelinski, population 167
- Bukevje, population 84
- Bukovec Zelinski, population 413
- Bunjak, population 133
- Curkovec, population 88
- Črečan, population 167
- Donja Drenova, population 308
- Donja Topličica, population 68
- Donja Zelina, population 847
- Donje Orešje, population 502
- Donje Psarjevo, population 311
- Dubovec Bisaški, population 86
- Filipovići, population 70
- Goričanec, population 77
- Goričica, population 370
- Gornja Drenova, population 322
- Gornja Topličica, population 157
- Gornje Orešje, population 251
- Gornje Psarjevo, population 467
- Gornji Vinkovec, population 66
- Hrastje, population 193
- Hrnjanec, population 409
- Kalinje, population 236
- Keleminovec, population 116
- Kladešćica, population 0
- Komin, population 250
- Krečaves, population 256
- Križevčec, population 102
- Laktec, population 175
- Majkovec, population 194
- Marinovec Zelinski, population 73
- Mokrica Tomaševečka, population 40
- Nespeš, population 338
- Novakovec Bisaški, population 30
- Novo Mjesto, population 147
- Obrež Zelinski, population 64
- Paukovec, population 342
- Polonje, population 344
- Polonje Tomaševečko, population 42
- Prepolno, population 71
- Pretoki, population 295
- Radoišće, population 250
- Salnik, population 72
- Selnica Psarjevačka, population 223
- Suhodol Zelinski, population 99
- Sveta Helena, population 366
- Sveti Ivan Zelina, population 2,764
- Šalovec, population 169
- Šulinec, population 214
- Šurdovec, population 33
- Tomaševec, population 198
- Velika Gora, population 82
- Vukovje Zelinsko, population 90
- Zadrkovec, population 214
- Zrinšćina, population 126
- Žitomir, population 193
Town of Sveti Ivan Zelina: Population trends 1857–2021
v

population	9347	10439	11441	13320	15056	16986	17035	17885	17695	17524	16666	16051	15592	15552	16268	15959	14602
	1857	1869	1880	1890	1900	1910	1921	1931	1948	1953	1961	1971	1981	1991	2001	2011	2021

Sources: Croatian Bureau of Statistics publications

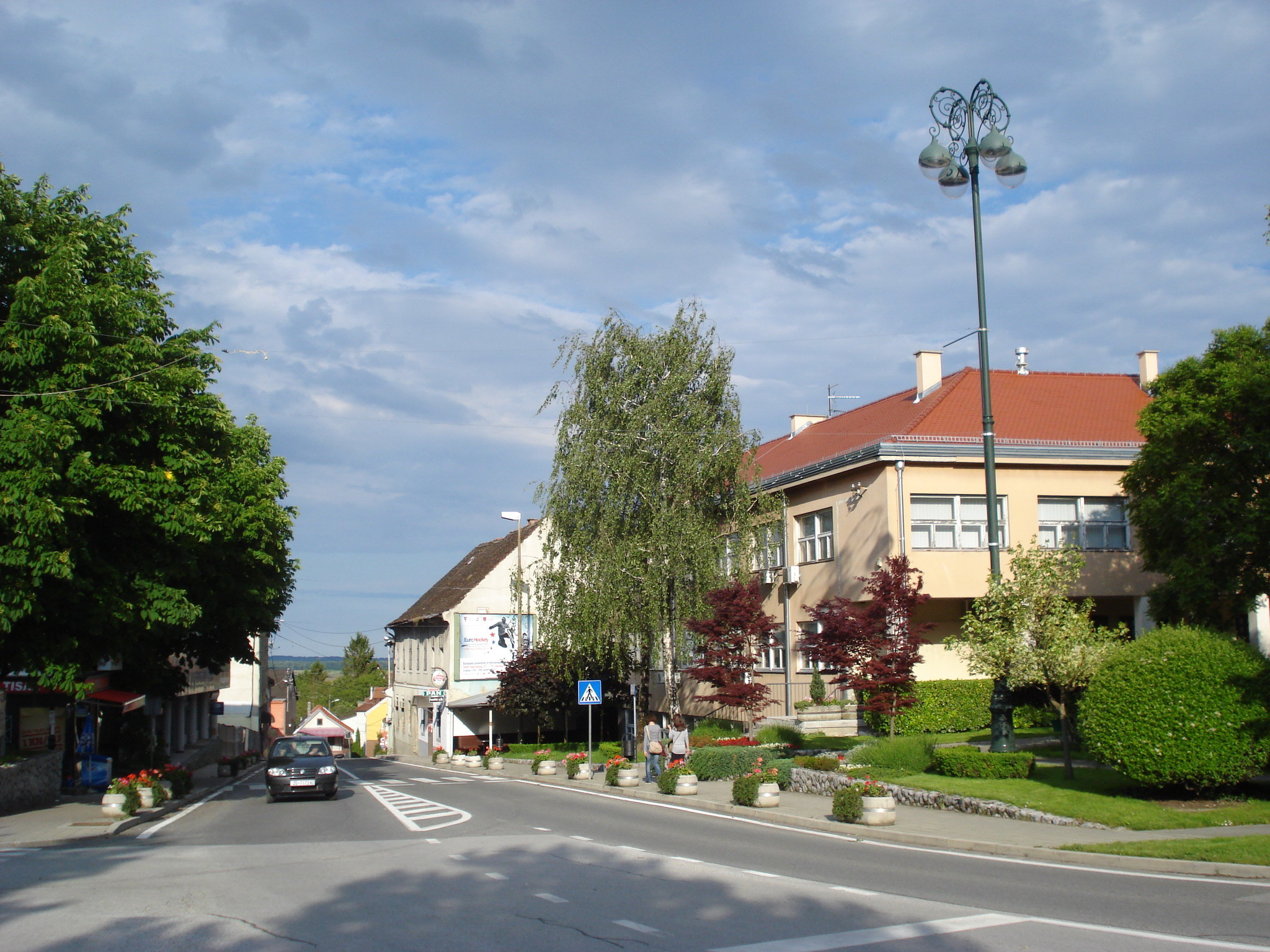
Town downtown

== History ==
In the late 19th and early 20th century, Sveti Ivan Zelina was a district capital in the Zagreb County of the Kingdom of Croatia-Slavonia.

From 1947 to 1990, during the Yugoslav era, the town was known as Zelina.

== Economy ==
Iskra company is one of the most important companies in Sveti Ivan Zelina.

== Notable inhabitants ==
- Dragutin Domjanić, a poet

== Education ==
Elementary and high-school are in Sveti Ivan Zelina.

== Sport ==
There was a swimming pool in Sveti Ivan Zelina (at present under renovation). Field Hockey. Women's Handball.
