= Kladešćica =

- Location within Croatia
- Coordinates: 45°59′23″N 16°11′10″E
- Country: Croatia
- County: Zagreb County
- City: Sveti Ivan Zelina

Area
  - Total: 9.0 km^{2} (3.5 sq mi)

Population (2021)
  - Total: 1
  - Density: 0.11/km^{2} (0.29/sq mi)
- Time zone: UTC+1 (CET)
  - Summer (DST): UTC+2 (CEST)

Kladešćica is an uninhabited naselje (settlement) in the town of Sveti Ivan Zelina in Zagreb County, Croatia.
