= Dubovec Bisaški =

Coordinates: 46°00′29″N 16°17′12″E

- Village
- Interactive map of Dubovec Bisaški
- Country: Croatia
- County: Zagreb County
- Municipality: Sveti Ivan Zelina

Area
  - Total: 1.4 km^{2} (0.54 sq mi)

Population (2021)
  - Total: 70
  - Density: 50/km^{2} (130/sq mi)
- Time zone: UTC+1 (CET)
  - Summer (DST): UTC+2 (CEST)

Dubovec Bisaški is a village in Croatia. It is connected by the D3 highway.
