= Bukevje, Sveti Ivan Zelina =

Coordinates: 45°43′N 16°13′E

Bukevje
- Settlement
- Location within Croatia
- Country: Croatia
- County: Zagreb
- City: Sveti Ivan Zelina

Area
  - Total: 2.3 km^{2} (0.89 sq mi)

Population (2021)
  - Total: 84
  - Density: 37/km^{2} (95/sq mi)
- Time zone: UTC+1 (CET)
  - Summer (DST): UTC+2 (CEST)

Bukevje is a settlement (naselje) in the Sveti Ivan Zelina administrative territory of Zagreb County, Croatia. As of 2011 it had a population of 84 people.
