= Markovo Polje =

- Village
- Location within Croatia
- Coordinates: 45°51′43″N 16°06′50″E
- Country: Croatia
- County: City of Zagreb

Area
  - Total: 0.93 sq mi (2.4 km^{2})

Population (2021)
  - Total: 447
  - Density: 480/sq mi (190/km^{2})
- Time zone: UTC+1 (CET)
  - Summer (DST): UTC+2 (CEST)

Markovo Polje is a village in Croatia. It is formally a settlement (naselje) of Zagreb, the capital of Croatia.

A cemetery is located there.

== Demographics ==
According to the 2021 census, its population was 447. According to the 2011 census, it had 425 inhabitants.
