= Keleminovec =

Coordinates: 45°59′N 16°17′E

- Settlement
- Location within Croatia
- Country: Croatia
- County: Zagreb
- City: Sveti Ivan Zelina

Area
  - Total: 0.8 km^{2} (0.31 sq mi)

Population (2021)
  - Total: 106
  - Density: 130/km^{2} (340/sq mi)
- Time zone: UTC+1 (CET)
  - Summer (DST): UTC+2 (CEST)

Keleminovec is a settlement (naselje) in the Sveti Ivan Zelina administrative territory of Zagreb County, Croatia. In 2011, it had a population of 116.
