= Bukovec Zelinski =

- Settlement
- Location of Bukovec Zelinski within Croatia
- Coordinates: 45°54′N 16°11′E
- Country: Croatia
- County: Zagreb County
- Municipality: Sveti Ivan Zelina

Area
  - Total: 2.3 km^{2} (0.89 sq mi)
- Elevation: 90 m (300 ft)

Population (2021)
  - Total: 356
  - Density: 150/km^{2} (400/sq mi)
- Time zone: UTC+1 (CET)
  - Summer (DST): UTC+2 (CEST)
- Postal code: 10380 Sveti Ivan Zelina

Bukovec Zelinski is a village in Croatia.
