= Donje Psarjevo =

- Village
- Location within Croatia
- Coordinates: 45.941441°N 16.224314°E
- Country: Croatia
- County: Zagreb County
- Municipality: Sveti Ivan Zelina

Area
  - Total: 1.6 km^{2} (0.62 sq mi)

Population (2021)
  - Total: 284
  - Density: 180/km^{2} (460/sq mi)
- Time zone: UTC+1 (CET)
  - Summer (DST): UTC+2 (CEST)

Donje Psarjevo is a village in Croatia.
