= Donja Drenova =

- Settlement
- Location within Croatia
- Country: Croatia
- County: Zagreb
- City: Sveti Ivan Zelina

Area
  - Total: 2.8 km^{2} (1.1 sq mi)

Population (2021)
  - Total: 300
  - Density: 110/km^{2} (280/sq mi)
- Time zone: UTC+1 (CET)
  - Summer (DST): UTC+2 (CEST)

Donja Drenova is a settlement (naselje) in the Sveti Ivan Zelina administrative territory of Zagreb County, Croatia. As of the 2011 census, it had a population of 308 people.
