= Hrastje, Croatia =

Coordinates: 45°58′37″N 16°16′26″E

Hrastje
- Village
- Interactive map of Hrastje
- Country: Croatia
- County: Zagreb County
- Municipality: Sveti Ivan Zelina

Area
  - Total: 2.1 km^{2} (0.81 sq mi)

Population (2021)
  - Total: 207
  - Density: 99/km^{2} (260/sq mi)
- Time zone: UTC+1 (CET)
  - Summer (DST): UTC+2 (CEST)

Hrastje is a village in Croatia. It is connected by the D3 highway.
