= Turkovčina =

- Settlement
- Location within Croatia
- Coordinates: 46°2′38″N 16°14′49″E
- Country: Croatia
- County: Zagreb
- Municipality: Bedenica

Area
  - Total: 6.0 km^{2} (2.3 sq mi)

Population (2021)
  - Total: 296
  - Density: 49/km^{2} (130/sq mi)
- Time zone: UTC+1 (CET)
  - Summer (DST): UTC+2 (CEST)

Turkovčina is a village in the municipality of Bedenica in Zagreb County, Croatia.

The village has 334 inhabitants in the 2011 census.
