= Blaškovec =

- Settlement
- Location of Blaškovec within Croatia
- Coordinates: 45.907527°N 16.192303°E
- Country: Croatia
- County: Zagreb County
- Municipality: Sveti Ivan Zelina

Area
  - Total: 4.0 km^{2} (1.5 sq mi)
- Elevation: 90 m (300 ft)

Population (2021)
  - Total: 559
  - Density: 140/km^{2} (360/sq mi)
- Time zone: UTC+1 (CET)
  - Summer (DST): UTC+2 (CEST)
- Postal code: 10380 Sveti Ivan Zelina

Blaškovec is a village in Croatia. It is connected to Rijeka and Zagreb by the D3 highway. It is the birthplace of Ivan Nepomuk Labaš, who translated the Bible into Kajkavian.
