= Breg Mokrički =

- Settlement
- Location within Croatia
- Coordinates: 45°57′32″N 16°15′43″E
- Country: Croatia
- County: Zagreb
- City: Sveti Ivan Zelina

Area
  - Total: 1.7 km^{2} (0.66 sq mi)

Population (2021)
  - Total: 46
  - Density: 27/km^{2} (70/sq mi)
- Time zone: UTC+1 (CET)
  - Summer (DST): UTC+2 (CEST)

Breg Mokrički is a settlement (naselje) in the Sveti Ivan Zelina administrative territory of Zagreb County, Croatia. As of 2011 it had a population of 45 people.
