= Bunjak =

- Village
- Location within Croatia
- Coordinates: 45.943851°N 16.192935°E
- Country: Croatia
- County: Zagreb County
- Municipality: Sveti Ivan Zelina

Area
  - Total: 1.8 km^{2} (0.69 sq mi)

Population (2021)
  - Total: 123
  - Density: 68/km^{2} (180/sq mi)
- Time zone: UTC+1 (CET)
  - Summer (DST): UTC+2 (CEST)

Bunjak is a village in Croatia.
