= Žitomir =

- Location within Croatia
- Coordinates: 46.017593°N 16.196784°E
- Country: Croatia
- County: Zagreb County

Area
  - Total: 4.3 km^{2} (1.7 sq mi)

Population (2021)
  - Total: 158
  - Density: 37/km^{2} (95/sq mi)
- Time zone: UTC+1 (Central European Time)

Žitomir is a village in Zagreb County, Croatia. Administratively, it is a part of the township of Sveti Ivan Zelina.
