= Goričica, Croatia =

Goričica
- Village
- Location within Croatia
- Coordinates: 45.896812°N 16.202736°E
- Country: Croatia
- County: Zagreb County
- Municipality: Sveti Ivan Zelina

Area
  - Total: 1.4 km^{2} (0.54 sq mi)

Population (2021)
  - Total: 346
  - Density: 250/km^{2} (640/sq mi)
- Time zone: UTC+1 (CET)
  - Summer (DST): UTC+2 (CEST)

Goričica is a village in Croatia. It is connected by the D3 highway.
