= Komin, Zagreb County =

Komin
- Village
- Interactive map of Komin
- Location within Croatia
- Coordinates: 46.003484°N 16.284972°E
- Country: Croatia
- County: Zagreb County
- Municipality: Sveti Ivan Zelina

Area
  - Total: 2.1 km^{2} (0.81 sq mi)

Population (2021)
  - Total: 204
  - Density: 97/km^{2} (250/sq mi)
- Time zone: UTC+1 (CET)
  - Summer (DST): UTC+2 (CEST)

Komin is a village in Croatia. It is connected by the D3 highway.

The ancient Roman settlement of Pyrri is believed to have existed on a hill near Komin.
