= Gornja Drenova, Croatia =

Coordinates: 45°56′10″N 16°11′16″E

Gornja Drenova
- Village
- Interactive map of Gornja Drenova
- Country: Croatia
- County: Zagreb County
- Municipality: Sveti Ivan Zelina

Area
  - Total: 6.5 km^{2} (2.5 sq mi)

Population (2021)
  - Total: 269
  - Density: 41/km^{2} (110/sq mi)
- Time zone: UTC+1 (CET)
  - Summer (DST): UTC+2 (CEST)

Gornja Drenova is a village in Croatia. The village has a population of around 300.
