= Pretoki =

Coordinates: 45°57′00″N 16°13′59″E

- Village
- Interactive map of Pretoki
- Country: Croatia
- County: Zagreb County

Area
  - Total: 0.8 km^{2} (0.31 sq mi)

Population (2021)
  - Total: 277
  - Density: 350/km^{2} (900/sq mi)
- Time zone: UTC+1 (CET)
  - Summer (DST): UTC+2 (CEST)

Pretoki is a village in Croatia. It is connected by the D3 highway.
