= Nespeš =

Coordinates: 45°57′N 16°12′E

- Village
- Interactive map of Nespeš
- Country: Croatia
- County: Zagreb County

Area
  - Total: 2.2 km^{2} (0.85 sq mi)

Population (2021)
  - Total: 298
  - Density: 140/km^{2} (350/sq mi)
- Time zone: UTC+1 (CET)
  - Summer (DST): UTC+2 (CEST)

Nespeš is a village in Croatia.
