= D307 road =

State road in northwestern Croatia

D307 state road

Route information
- Length: 23.8 km (14.8 mi)

Major junctions
- From: D1 and D205 in Gubaševo
- A2 in Zabok interchange
- To: D29 in Marija Bistrica

Location
- Country: Croatia
- Counties: Krapina-Zagorje
- Major cities: Oroslavje, Marija Bistrica

Highway system
- Highways in Croatia

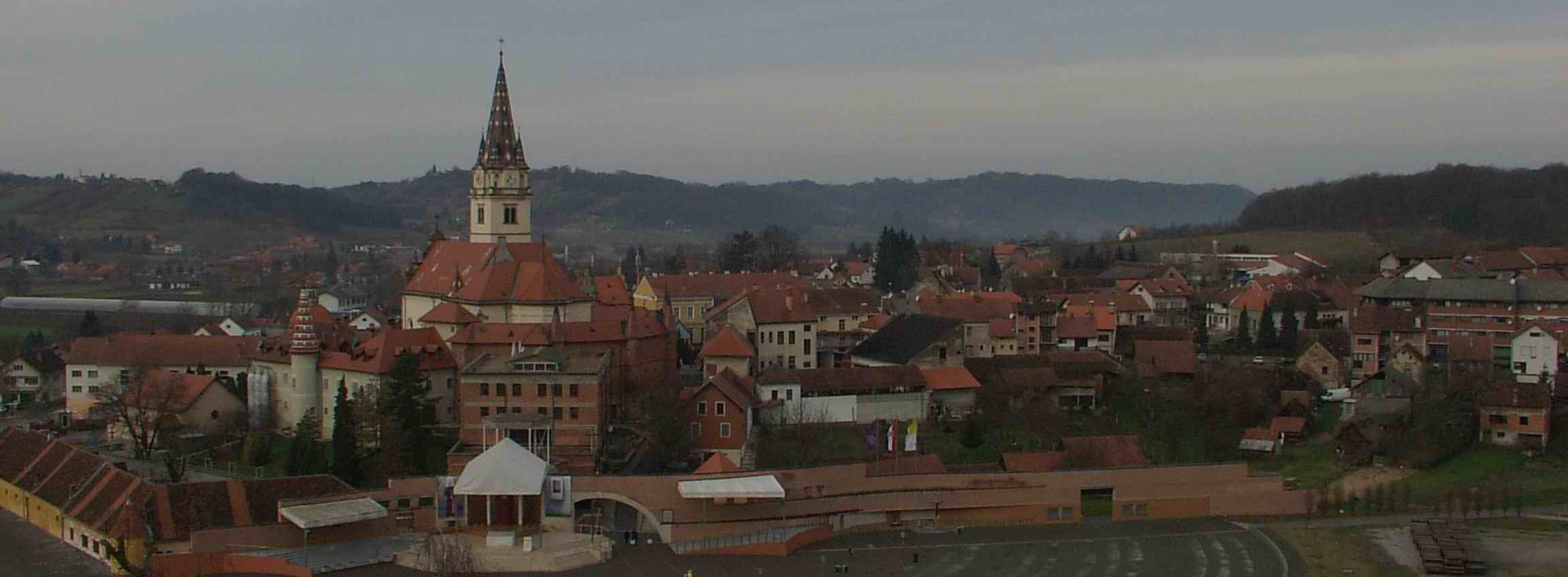
Marija Bistrica, at the eastern terminus of the D307 road

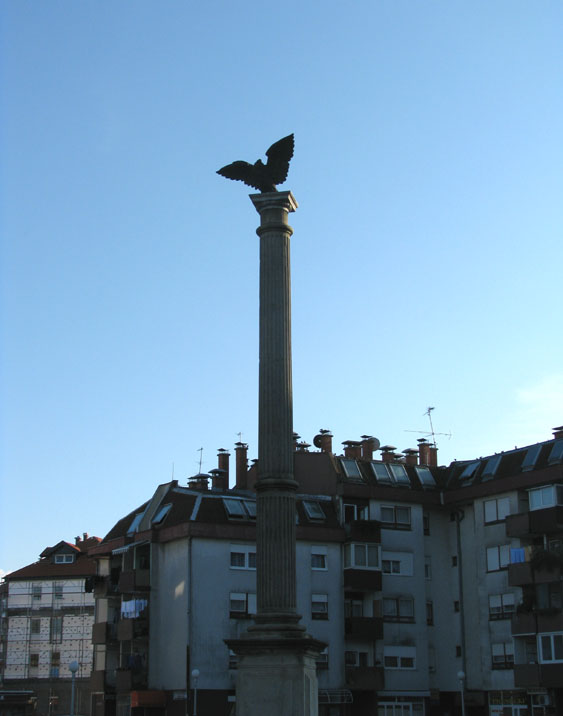
Oroslavje, on the D307 road route

D307 is a state road in Hrvatsko Zagorje region of Croatia connecting Oroslavje and Donja Stubica to the A2 motorway in Zabok interchange. The road is 23.8 km (14.8 mi) long.

The road, as well as all other state roads in Croatia, is managed and maintained by Hrvatske ceste, state owned company.

== Traffic volume ==
Traffic is regularly counted and reported by Hrvatske ceste, operator of the road.

D307 traffic volume
Road	Counting site	AADT	ASDT	Notes
D307	1901 Stubičke Toplice	8,047	8,216	Adjacent to the Ž2200 junction.

== Road junctions and populated areas ==
D307 junctions/populated areas
Type	Slip roads/Notes
	Gubaševo; D1 to Zabok and Sveti Križ Začretje (to the north) and to Zaprešić via D225 state road (to the south). D205 to Klanjec and Kumrovec. The western terminus of the road.
	A2 in Zabok interchange to Krapina (to the north) and to the A3 motorway Jankomir interchange and Zagreb (to the south).
	Mokrice
	Oroslavje; Ž2197 to Hum Zabočki (D24).
	Stubičke Toplice; Ž2219 to Pila.
	Donja Stubica; Ž2198 to Lepa Ves and Bedekovčina (D24). Ž2200 to Hruševec.
	Gornja Stubica; Ž2224 to Sveti Matej.
	Samci; Ž2223 to Modrovec.
	Banšćica; Ž2201 to Dubovec and Selnica.
	Gusakovec
	Marija Bistrica; D29 to Zlatar Bistrica and Soblinec (D3). The eastern terminus of the road.
