= Stubičke Toplice =

- Municipality
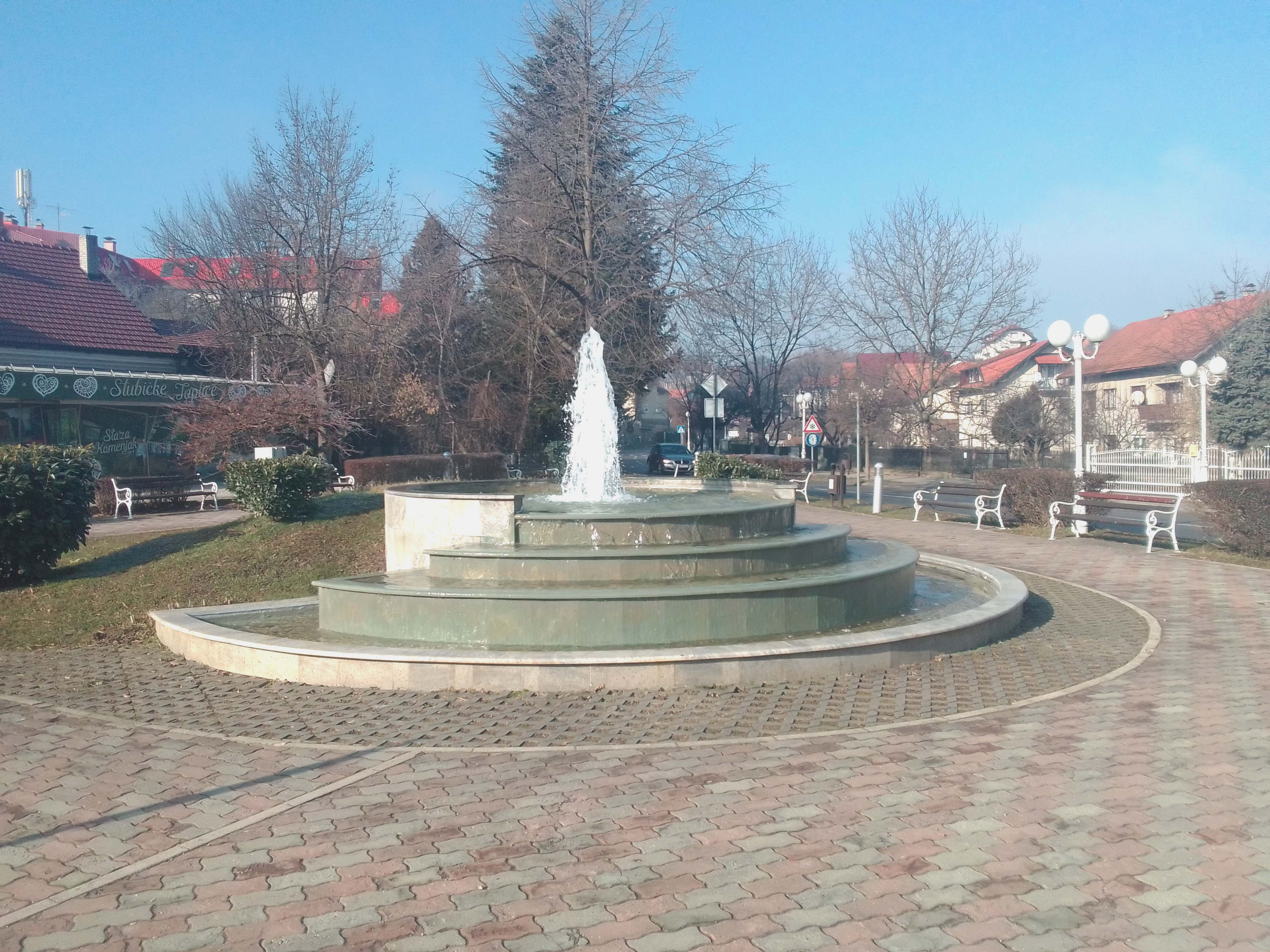
- Stubičke Toplice center square in January 2020

- Location within Krapina-Zagorje County Location within Croatia
- Coordinates: 45°58′33″N 15°55′56″E
- Country: Croatia
- County: Krapina-Zagorje County

Government
  - Municipal Mayor: Josip Beljak (Independent)

Area
  - Municipality: 27.0 km^{2} (10.4 sq mi)
  - Urban: 5.6 km^{2} (2.2 sq mi)

Population (2021)
  - Municipality: 2,740
  - Density: 101/km^{2} (263/sq mi)
  - Urban: 1,775
  - Urban density: 320/km^{2} (820/sq mi)
- Time zone: UTC+1 (CET)
  - Summer (DST): UTC+2 (CEST)
- Postal code: HR-49244
- Area code: +385 49
- Vehicle registration: KR
- Website: stubicketoplice.hr

Stubičke Toplice (Croatian pronunciation: [stûbitʃkeː tǒplit͡se]) is a municipality in Croatia in the Krapina-Zagorje County. With its centuries-old tourist tradition, it is a very popular vacation spot located in the continental part of the country, serving as a spa center and health resort. Connected by the state road D307 and L202 railway it is located 40 kilometers (25 miles) north from the country's capital city Zagreb. From amalgamation of a local community, the municipality of Stubičke Toplice was founded on 27 April 1993 as a unit of local government.

The name of the town literally means "the spa of Stubica", marking it as the spa resort near the town of Donja Stubica.

== History ==
=== Ancient times ===
Stubičke Toplice has a long, rich and diverse history. It is believed that the town was known as early as the time of Roman Empire, due to two Roman coins from the era of emperor Hadrian that were found near the pool in 1963.

=== 13th to 18th century ===
The first written trace of the place was found in 1209, in the charter of Hungarian-Croatian King Andrew II, where the toponyms "Toplice" and "Stubica" are mentioned.

In the Middle Ages, Stubičke Toplice was mentioned in 1567, in the investigation against Franjo Tahy, when this area belonged to the Susedgrad-Stubica seigniory. The final battle of the great peasant fight in 1573 took place on the hill Kapelšćak. At the top of the hill, there was a small chapel of St. Catherine at the time, for which the visitation from 1622 suggests was once a parish church.

The sources of thermal water hot springs in Stubičke Toplice were first described by Hungarian historian Nikola Isthvánffy in the 17th century. In the 18th century Stubičke Toplice was owned by counts Vojkffy - Vojković from Donje Oroslavje. In 1776, count K. Vojkffy built, besides the springs itself, the first swimming pool, which represents the beginning of a future spa and balneology tradition.

=== Maksimilijan Vrhovac period and sudden development of the resort (18th and 19th century) ===
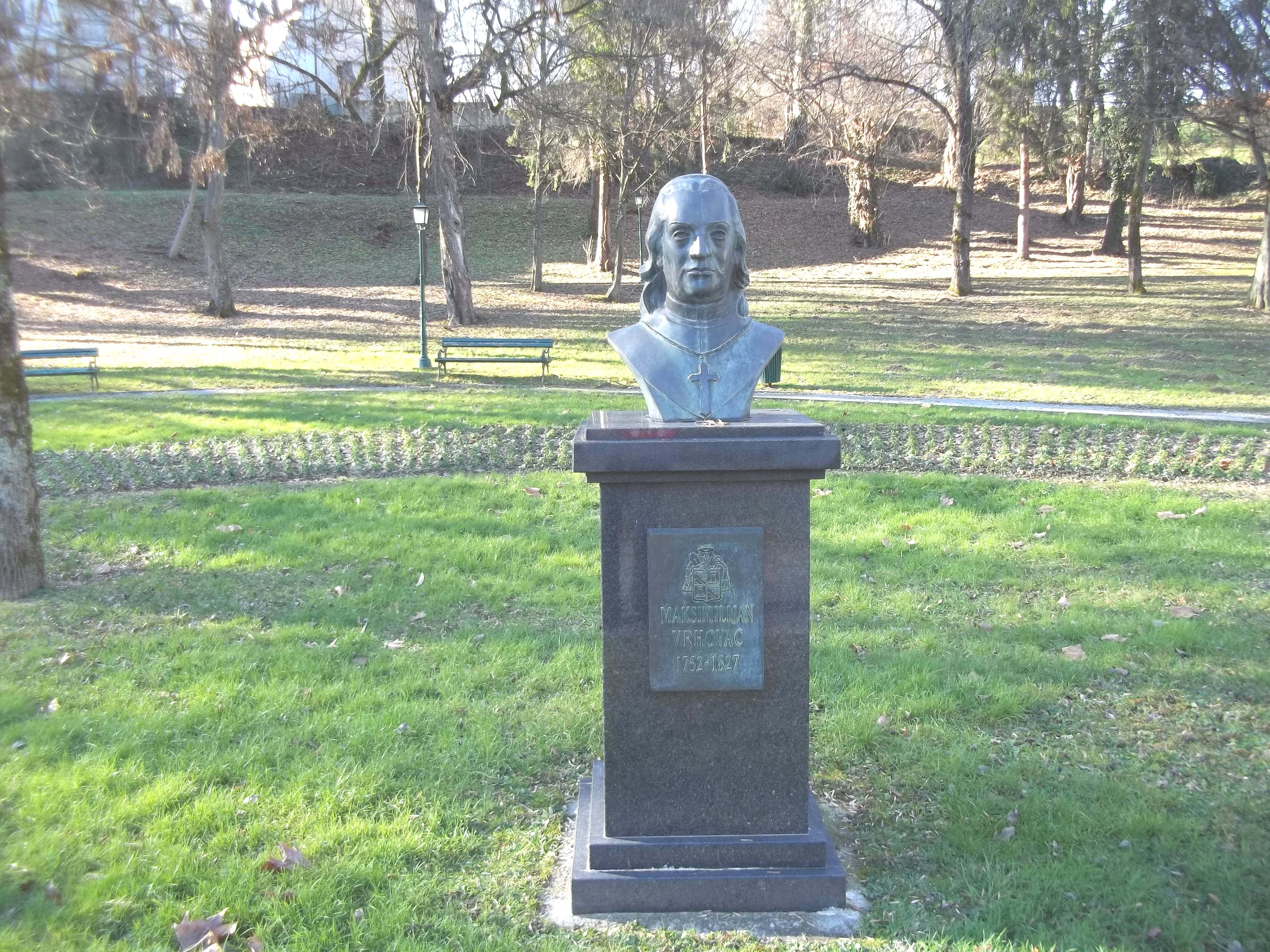
Statue of the bishop Maksimilijan Vrhovac in the central park

A significant period in development of Stubičke Toplice began in 1806, when the Zagreb bishop Maksimilijan Vrhovac (Karlovac, 23. 11. 1752. - Zagreb, 16. 12. 1827) bought nearby Golubovec castle from the Domjanić family and then thermal springs in Stubičke Toplice from counts Vojkffy – Vojković. Until 1811, Vrhovac systematically bought the surrounding land, increased the possession of the place and turned it into a large complex where a modern thermal spa would be built.

In 1811, the construction of the main building – Maksimilijan's bath – began. The draft was made by the official builder of Bishop Vrhovac – Heinrich Vesteburg. The great building of the Maksimilijan bath, well-composed and functionally solved, made in baroque style, was a very large investment for its time. It was also the first regulated thermal spa in Croatia, which, in some of the later modifications, still works today. In the park, behind the Maksimilijan bath, a neo gothic-stylized octagonal pavilion was built, named the Steam bath of Dijana, presenting one of the first applications of the neogothicism at this area.

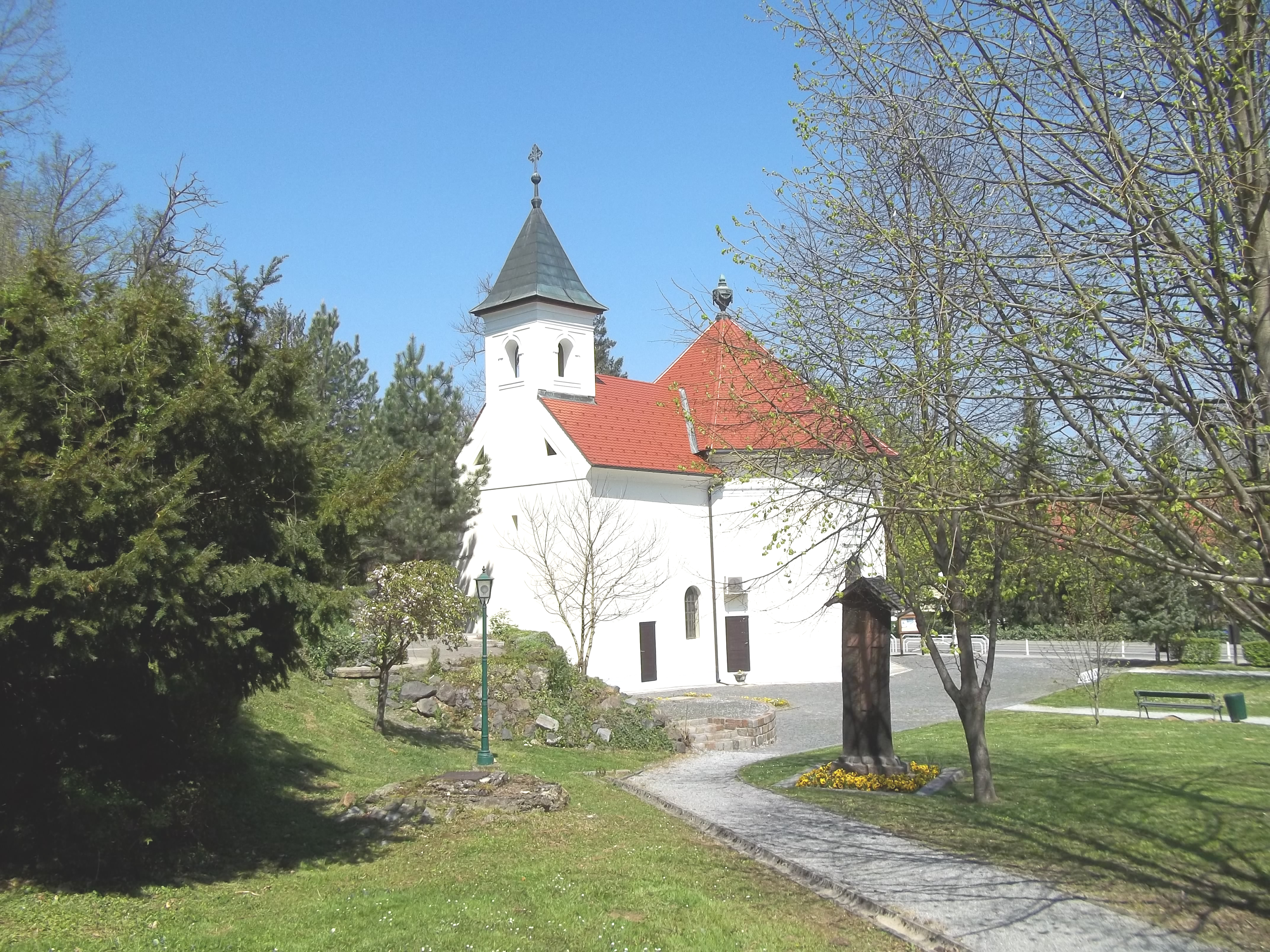
St. Catherine chapel (built in 1814) served as the only parish church in the town from 1994 to 2019, when the newly built church of St. Joseph was dedicated and opened.

The third building of the whole resort complex, the classicist chapel of St. Catherine, was built by the same person. It was built and dedicated in 1814. On the complex of Stubičke Toplice, the same person, at the same time, built the three objects and applied different styles (baroque tradition, neo-gothic, classicism). At the invitation of the bishop of Maksimilijan Vrhovac in Stubičke Toplice, the most famous doctors and surgeons come to investigate and confirm the healing and possible health care enabled by using thermal springs.

During the 19th century, the owners of the spa were heirs of Vrhovac in Stubički Golubovec - Novosel nobles, counts Sermage, barunes Rauch and Barunes Steeb as the last owners. By 1918, the bath did not change its mode of operation.

=== 20th century - present ===
The first illustrated tourist guide publication of Stubičke Toplice, The Mineral Bath and Spas of Stubičke Toplice, was printed in 1914 when the owner of the spa was Levin Baron Rauch. Activity at the resort and spa was then cut off following World War I. Before the construction of the Zabok-Gornja Stubica railway in 1916, the town was connected with the neighbouring town of Zabok with the spa-owned car.

Between the two world wars, the spa became a joint-stock company. Outdoor pools, catering and other facilities are built. Stubičke Toplice became the most visited excursion site in the vicinity of Zagreb. In the second half of 20th century, significant expansion of the spa began, with upgrading of the baths, rehabilitation center and construction of the new hotel.

Prior to 1993, Stubičke Toplice belonged to the territory of the former Municipality of Donja Stubica (which earned town privileges in 1997). Since the municipality of Stubičke Toplice was founded on April 27, 1993, a large number of building, infrastructural, cultural, educational and social projects in the town were realized through the initiative of Vladimir Bosnar, arguably the most favored and memorable mayor by the town inhabitants, who served in this position from the municipality's inception until his death in 2017 (with a short break in early 2000s).

In 2020, during the COVID-19 pandemic, Stubičke Toplice got affected by two strong earthquakes which caused no reported casualties or material damages.5.5 magnitude earthquake that happened on March 22, 2020 (the strongest one in that area since 1880), however, caused significant material damages in the neighboring town of Donja Stubica and municipality of Gornja Stubica A 3-metre wide (10 ft) sinkhole opened on the grounds of Special hospital for medical rehabilitation after the earthquake. On December 29, 2020, the town was also affected by 2020 Petrinja earthquake. 2024 saw a construction of a new 5-star hotel in the town, located within the spa complex.

== Geography ==
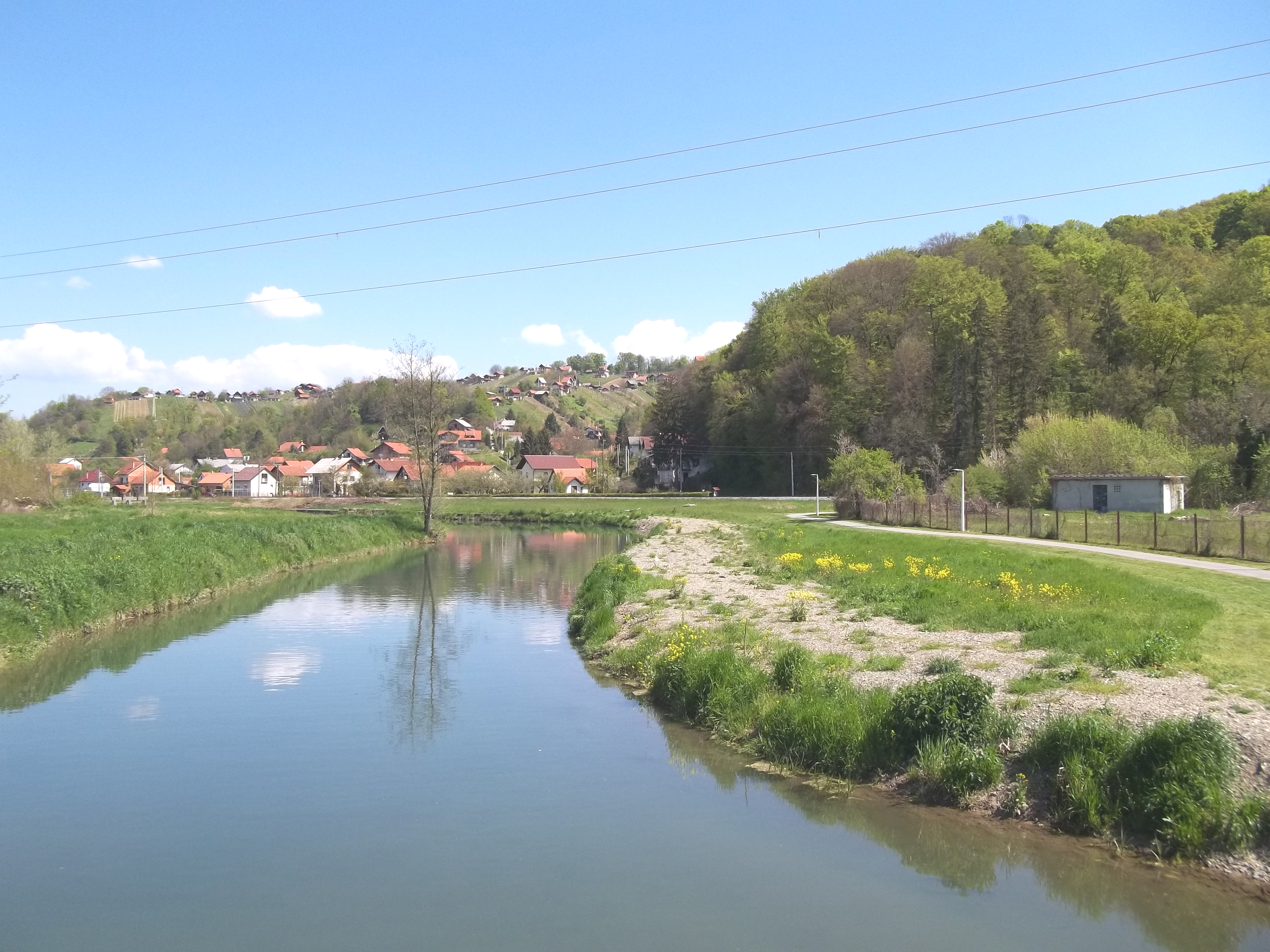
Valley of the creek Vidak with the settlement under Kamenjak forest. Prior to 1991, when it was annexed to the territory of Stubičke Toplice, the settlement on the picture (located on the north side of municipality) belonged to the territory of the village Andraševec.

=== Geology and topology ===
Stubičke Toplice, one of the smallest municipalities in the county, occupies 25 square kilometers (10.4 square miles), and is 162 meters (531 feet) above sea level. It is situated in the southern part of Krapina-Zagorje County, lying underneath the northern slopes of Medvednica mountain, approximately 40 kilometers (25 miles) north of the capital city Zagreb (which is situated beneath the opposite, south side of the mountain).

Protected by the hills Kamenjak from north-east and Kapelšćak from south-west, Stubičke Toplice marks the confluence of the local creeks Vidak and Topličina. About 80% of the town's area is located in the Nature park of Medvednica - the natural landscape value of the municipality.

The whole area of the municipality is covered by the hills that are connected to the Medvednica massif on the southeast and to the Krapina river valley on the north. The area of Stubičke Toplice is stretched by a dense network of mountain creeks, which belong to the Krapina river basin. It is an area of diverse vegetation made up of forests, plateaux, valleys, meadows and preserved streams of mountain valley watercourses. Oak, hornbeam and beech communities predominate on the slopes of the local hills. However, on the higher and colder parts of Medvednica mountain, the most common are the forests of beech and pine. The vegetation along the creek valleys is primarily made of willows, alders and secondary communities of humid habitats in the form of a tall sedge. Swamp areas occur in places with slower water flows.

The settlement borders on the east with the town Donja Stubica, west with the village Krušljevo Selo (territory of the town Oroslavje) and Zagreb County, more precisely with the municipality of Jakovlje (village Igrišće), north with Oroslavje and village Andraševec (Oroslavje territory), south with the municipality of Jakovlje (more precisely Kraljev Vrh), the city of Zagreb (neighborhood Podsljeme) and southwest with Zagreb County (municipality of Bistra).

=== Climate ===
Stubičke Toplice area has a humid continental climate, with average relative humidity of 75-80%. The average temperature in the town is 9.6 degrees Celsius (49.3 °F); 18.9 °C (66.0 °F) in summer and 0.2 °C (32.4 °F) in winter. Estimated annual rainfall is 1164 mm (according to the 2013 census). The most common winds are southwest (SW) and northwest (NW).

Since records began in 1961, the highest temperature recorded at the local weather station was 38.5 °C (101.3 °F), on 13 August 2003. The coldest temperature was −25.5 °C (−13.9 °F), on 17 January 1963.

== Demographics ==
In the 2021 census, the municipality had a total of 2,740 inhabitants, in the following settlements:

- Pila, population 166
- Sljeme, no population
- Strmec Stubički, population 799
- Stubičke Toplice, population 1,775
Stubičke Toplice: Population trends 1857–2021
v

population	859	1029	1107	1219	1480	1585	1496	1814	1795	1935	1831	1962	2201	2528	2752	2805	2740
	1857	1869	1880	1890	1900	1910	1921	1931	1948	1953	1961	1971	1981	1991	2001	2011	2021

Sources: Croatian Bureau of Statistics publications

== Administration ==
The current mayor of Stubičke Toplice is Josip Beljak and the Stubičke Toplice Municipal Council consists of 13 seats.

Groups	Councilors per group
Independents-Josip Beljak	5 / 13
SDP	4 / 13
Independents-Roman Rogović	3 / 13
HDZ	1 / 13

== Economy, tourism and culture ==
Stubičke Toplice plays an important role in the country's continental tourism. The town lies on the healing thermal springs, which offer natural wealth and potential to the town. The municipality bases itself on development of health, congress and recreational tourism.

=== Health and congress tourism ===
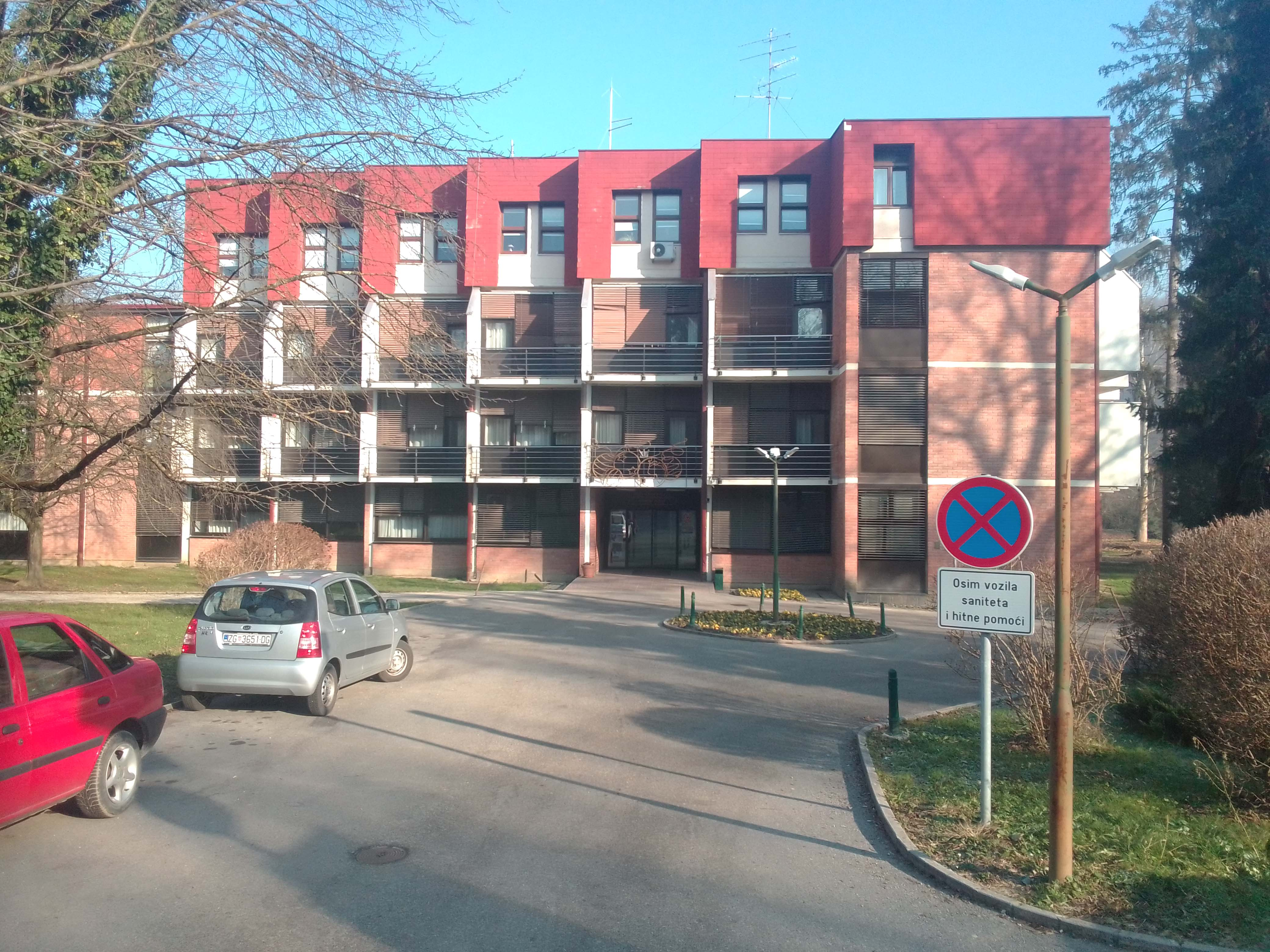
Special hospital for medical rehabilitation Stubičke Toplice (object Toplice)

Stubičke Toplice is a home to special hospital for physical rehabilitation, surrounded by a spacious park that stretches all the way to the forest slopes of the surrounding hills. It is a complex of three buildings: the oldest part of the spa complex, Maksimilijan (built in 1811), Toplice (built in 1973), and Dijana (featuring a fitness center; built in 1997).

In 2024, one part of the oldest building of the spa complex (Maksimilijan) was demolished, as this was necessary due to the construction of a new 5-star hotel on that site. The removed part of the original spa complex building was the only one that was not included in the reconstruction/modernization of the building's interior and exterior in 2010's.

Today, the Special Hospital is a successful provider of health tourism, using the tradition of treatment with thermal water as a natural healing factor and modern medical rehabilitation. Thermal spring water is known for its therapeutic properties, which can be used to treat various injuries, muscle inflammation, rheumatism, etc. It is characterized by high temperature at the source (43–63 °C), which is evidence of great depths. High temperature, and a rich chemical composition give great healing properties.

Together with the neighbouring 3-star hotel Matija Gubec built in 1972 and a 5-star hotel within the spa complex that is currently under construction, rehabilitation center provides modern wellness/spa, sauna, professional hydro massage and indoor/outdoor swimming pool services.

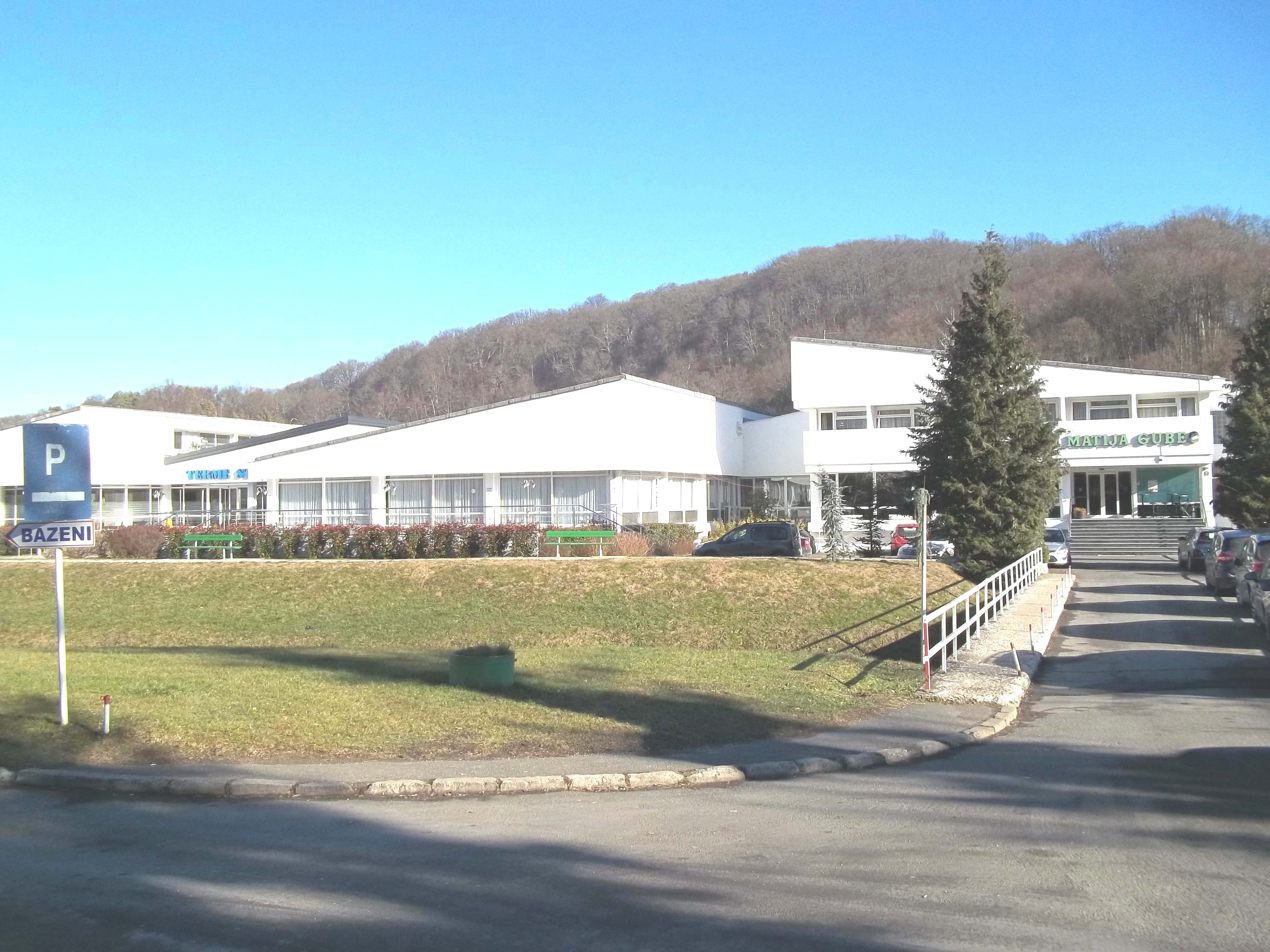
Hotel Matija Gubec with the Kamenjak hill in the background

=== Recreational tourism ===
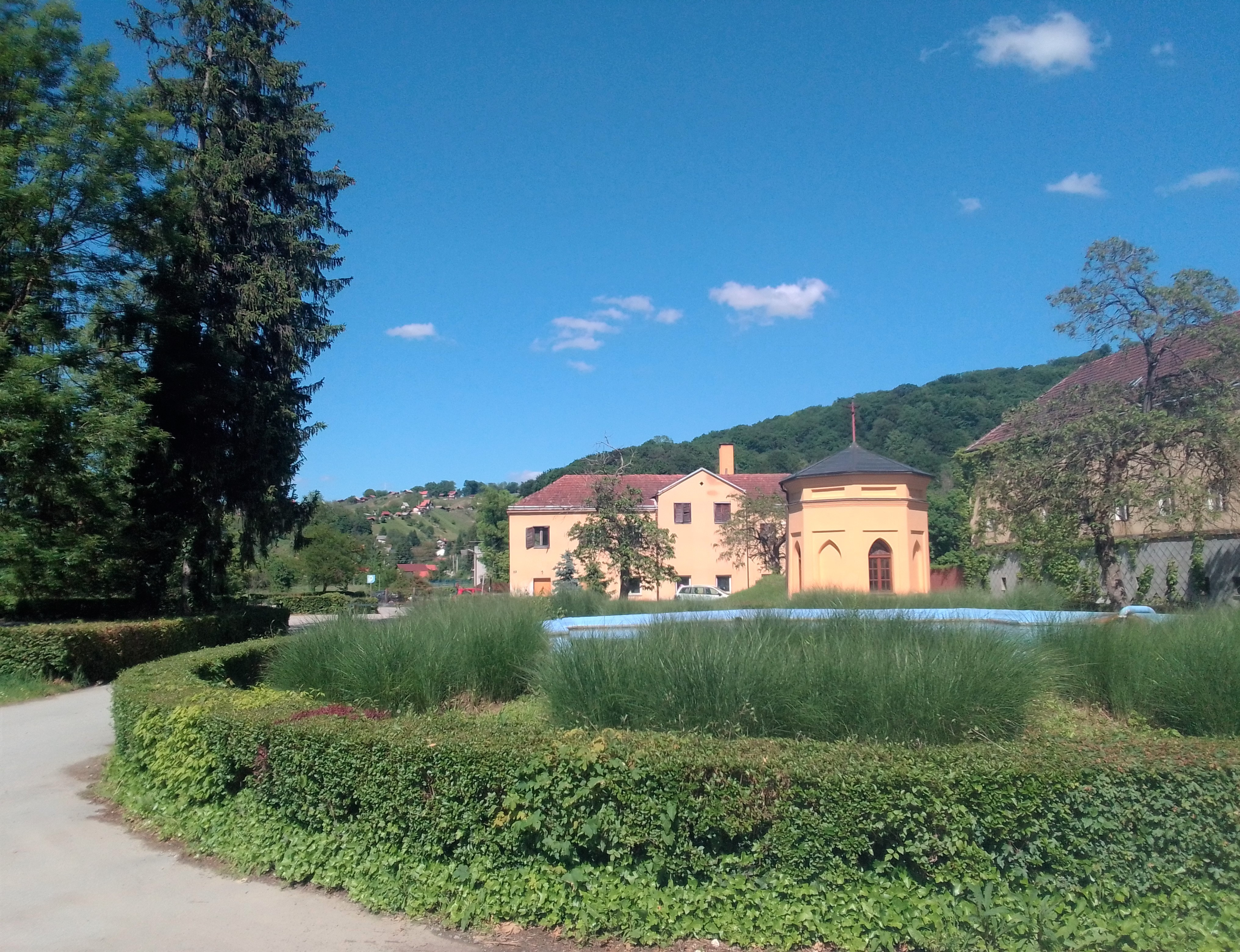
Maksimilijan is the oldest part of the rehabilitation center in Stubičke Toplice

Stubičke Toplice enjoys a picturesque landscape where the Medvednica forest slopes descend towards thermal springs. With its specialties (rich cultural heritage, healing thermal springs, Kapelščak and Kamenjak hills filled with historical stories, Lake Jarki, promenades, parks, biodiversity of the Medvednica Nature Park etc.), Stubičke Toplice attracts many hikers, tourists and mountaineers.

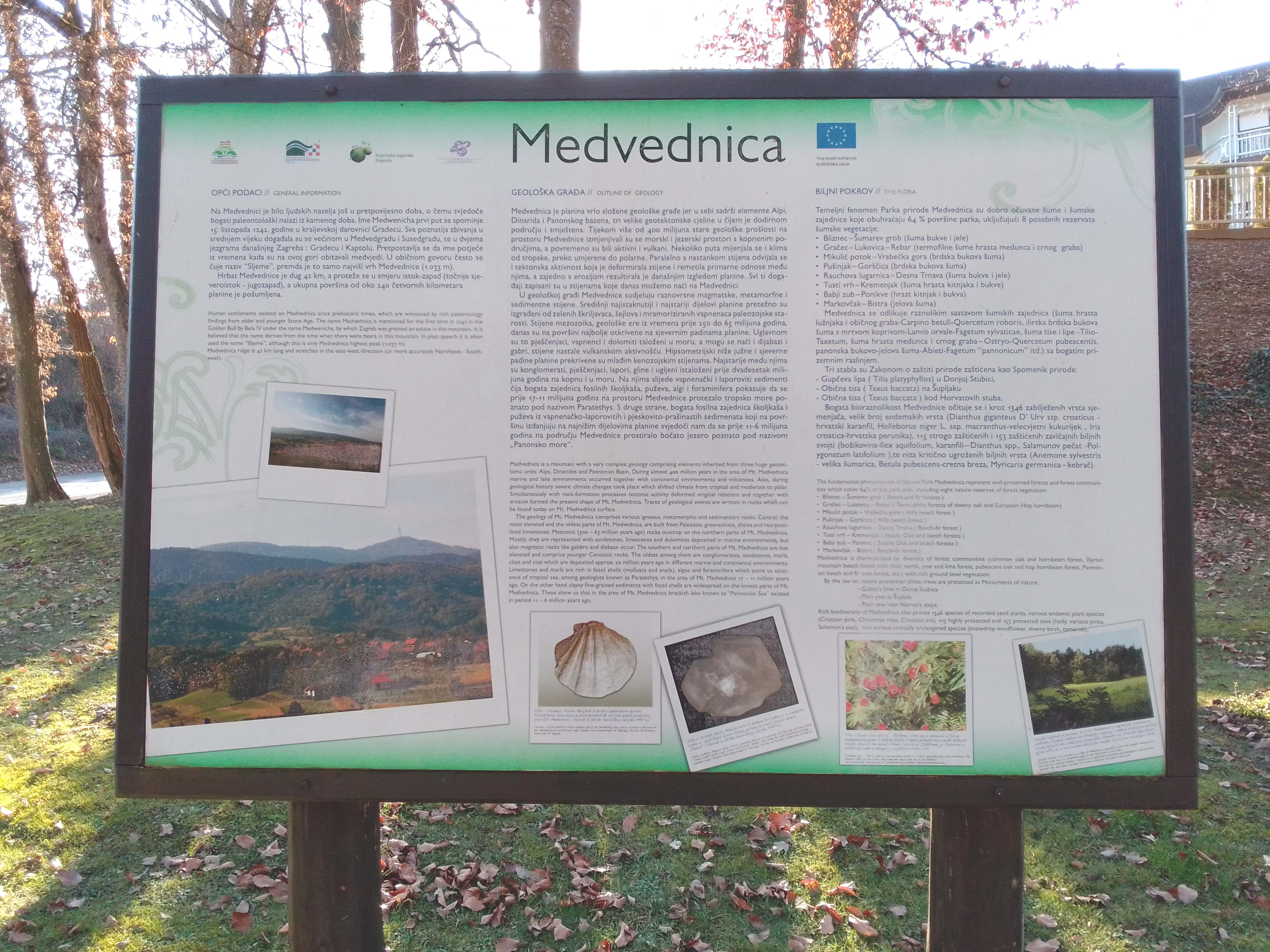
Entrance board of the Medvednica Nature Park

The historic educational forest trail Kamenjak, with its natural, religious and historical significance, was restored on the Kamenjak hill and the forest of the same name in late 2004 / early 2005 and again in 2014. It is located on the southwest side of Kamenjak forest, in the northeastern part of the Stubičke Toplice municipality, near the hotel Matija Gubec and the Special Hospital. The length of the track is 1200 meters and the altitude difference is 87 meters. The richness of the plant and animal world is the main feature of the forest. At the end of the trail there was an oak called Galženjak which collapsed in 2010s, former protected monument of nature since 1965, where, according to folk tales, the rebellious serfs of the 1573 peasant fight were hung. As a continuation of the peasant fight story, on the neighboring hill, the scenic and historical-memorial locality Kapelščak, there is a memorial plaque which marks the place where the revolt leader Matija Gubec was caught. The final part of the promenade leads to the small chapel of St. Catherine situated on the Kapelšćak hill.

=== Events, manifestations and cultural life ===
Stubičke Toplice's tourist board, in cooperation with active associations, promotes the cultural life of the town throughout the year. Exhibitions, concerts in the parish church, live bar music and various cultural and sporting events are organized. Cultural and historical values, traditional inheritance, protection of the environment and gastronomic traditions of Hrvatsko Zagorje region are promoted, with events like The Mushroom-picking autumn event in the village of Pila (Gljivarenje v Stubakima), „Easter“ (Vuzem) and „Christmas“ (Božić) in the local square etc.

The municipality hosts several associations aiming to promote different sports. Among the prominent sports associations, are clubs for auto-moto, cycling, fishing, mini football, table tennis and taekwondo. Since 1993, the mountain car race "Grand prix of Stubičke Toplice" (Velika nagrada Stubičkih Toplica) has been held.

Each year at the time of the Snow Queen Trophy event (a World cup alpine ski race held on Medvednica mountaintop Sljeme usually in early January), bus transfer for race-visitors is traditionally organized between Stubičke Toplice and Sljeme.

Stubičke Toplice is a recognizable ecological destination and a long-time winner of the prestigious "Green Flower" (Zeleni cvijet) award for the cleanest town in continental Croatia.

== Education ==
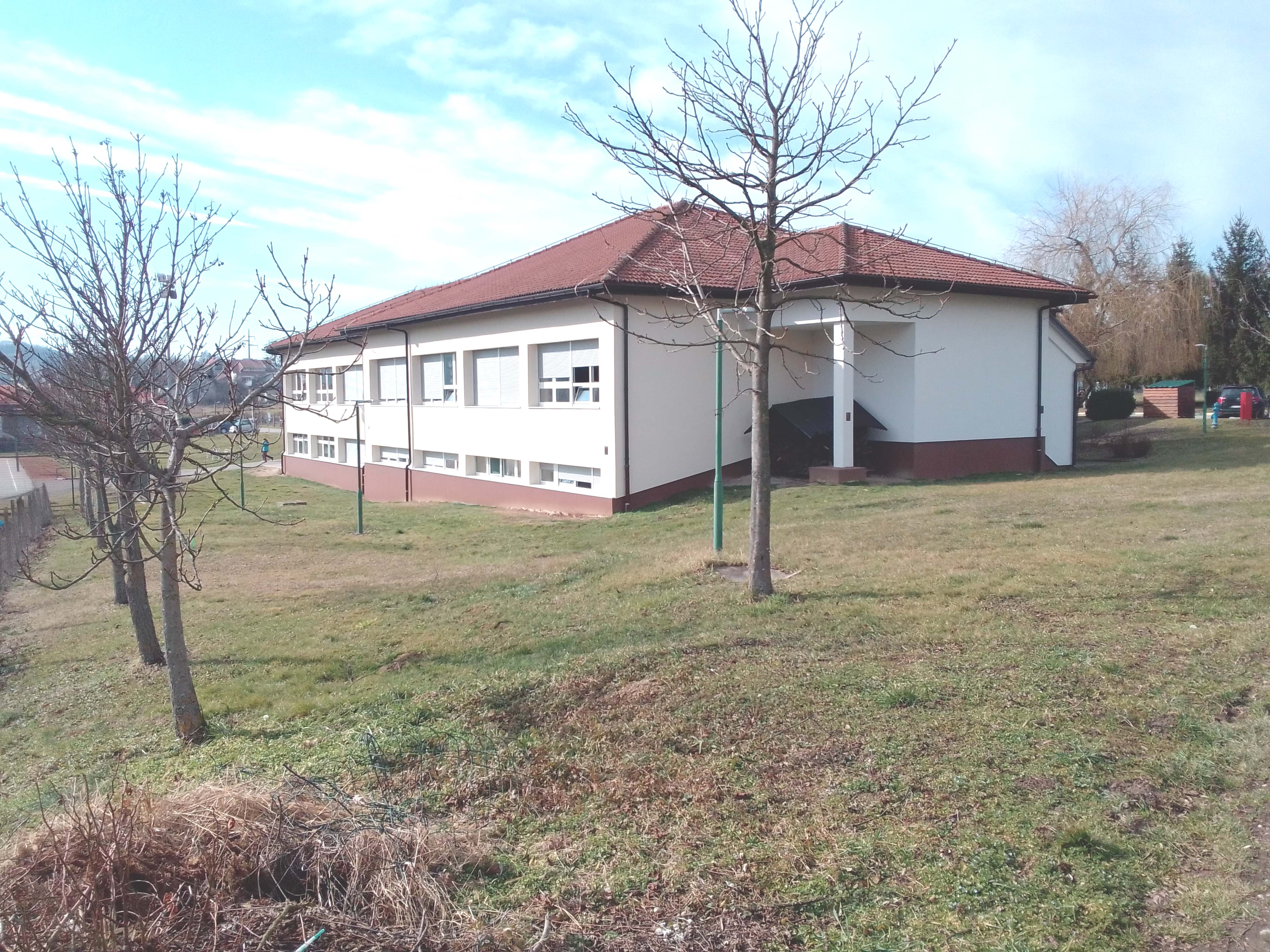
Elementary school Stubičke Toplice in February 2020

Stubičke Toplice has a school that provides elementary education program, serving grades 1–8. Construction of the current school building began in 1994. As a part of the elementary school in the neighbouring town of Donja Stubica, it began with its work with the program for grades 1–4 in 1996. For the students who finished grade 4 in Stubičke Toplice there was ensured extension of their elementary education from grade 5 at Elementary school Donja Stubica at that time. In 2009, the school has been upgraded and since then has been supporting entire Croatian primary education program. Later the same year, the school made secession from Elementary school Donja Stubica and started with its independent work.

The town also hosts kindergarten (Dječji vrtić Zvirek) opened in 2010 and municipality library (Općinska knjižnica) opened in 2018.

== Transportation ==
The town is daily connected by bus and railway with the neighboring and majority of the medium-distanced towns and municipalities, including Zagreb. On call taxi service is also available from the town center.

=== Road access ===
Stubičke Toplice is the northern terminus of the county road (Croatian: Županijska cesta) ŽU2219 (Stubičke Toplice - Pila - Sljeme - Zagreb) that, to the west-southwest, separates from the state road D307 on which the town lies. In the western part of the town area, the county road ŽU2217 (Stubičke Toplice - Krušljevo Selo - Stubička Slatina - Žeinci) also separates from the ŽU2219 road to the west-southwest.

Stubičke Toplice bus stop is served by cross-county and numerous of local bus lines such as Stubičke Toplice - Zagreb, Marija Bistrica - Zagreb, Marija Bistrica - Zabok, Stubičke Toplice - Konjščina, Zlatar - Zabok and Sveti Matej - Zabok. All mentioned regular bus lines are today operated by the company Presečki Grupa d.o.o.

=== Railway access ===
Stubičke Toplice has a train station on the local Zabok - Gornja Stubica railway corridor that is served by passenger trains.

== Bibliography ==
- Matoničkin, Ivo (1957). "Ekološka istraživanja faune termalnih voda Hrvatskog Zagorja" [Ecological Investigations of the Fauna of the Hot Springs of Hrvatsko Zagorje]. Rad Jugoslavenske akademije znanosti i umjetnosti. Odjel za prirodne nauke (in Serbo-Croatian). 733: 139–205. ISSN 1330-5697.
- Vouk, Vale (1916). "Biološka istraživanja termalnih voda Hrvatskoga zagorja" [Biological Explorations of the Hot Springs of Hrvatsko Zagorje]. Prirodoslovna istraživanja Hrvatske i Slavonije (in Serbo-Croatian). 8: 1–17. ISSN 1333-2325.
