= Dubovec =

Dubovec may refer to:

- Dubovec, Krapina-Zagorje County, a village near Gornja Stubica, Croatia
- Dubovec, Slovakia, a village and municipality in the Banská Bystrica Region
- Dubovec Bisaški, a village near Sveti Ivan Zelina, Croatia
- Donji Dubovec, a village near Križevci, Croatia
- Gornji Dubovec, a village near Križevci, Croatia
- Srednji Dubovec, a village near Križevci, Croatia

== See also ==
- Dubovac (disambiguation)
- Dubovica (disambiguation)
