= L202 railway (Croatia) =

Railway line in Krapina-Zagorje County, Croatia

Overview
- Status: Active
- Owner: HŽ Infrastruktura
- Locale: Krapina-Zagorje County
- Stations: 5

Service
- Type: Local rail
- Operator(s): Croatian Railways

History
- Opened: June 18, 1916

Technical
- Line length: 10.823 km (6.725 mi)
- Number of tracks: 1
- Track gauge: 1,435 mm (4 ft 8 1/2 in) standard gauge
- Electrification: Non-electrified
- Operating speed: 40 km/h (24.8 mph)

The Hum Lug-Gornja Stubica railway, officially designated as the L202 railway, is a 10.823 km (6.725 mi) railway line of local significance in Croatia that connects corridor's eastern terminus Gornja Stubica, along with the halts Donja Stubica, Stubičke Toplice and Oroslavje, with the R201 railway corridor (Zaprešić-Čakovec) in Hum Lug. The line is today used for passenger (local) transport exclusively.

The line, opened in 1916 in former Kingdom of Croatia-Slavonia (present-day Croatia), is single-tracked and non-electrified. This corridor's service contains the trains that are operating between stations Gornja Stubica and Zabok, using the corridor R201 for about 2 kilometers between Hum Lug and Zabok (where connections with the trains running on R201 and R106 corridors are made).

Introduction of diesel-motor trains on the route began in the second half of 1980s and from early 1990s, they have been operating passenger services exclusively (mostly HŽ series 7121), replacing compositions made of two-axle cars powered by steam and later diesel locomotives.

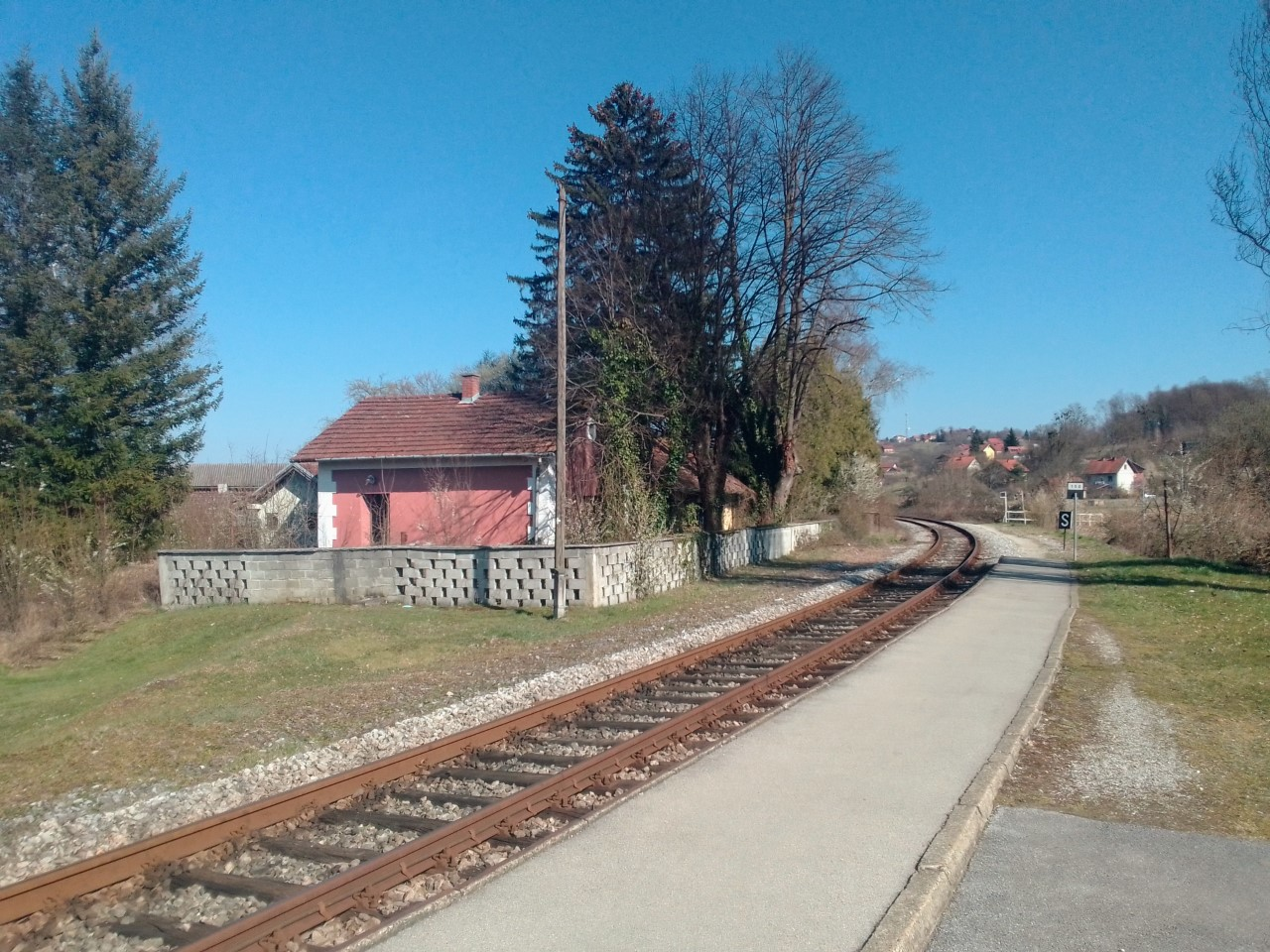
Stubičke Toplice train stop on L202 route in 2021
