= Gornja Stubica =

- Location within Croatia
- Coordinates: 45°57′36″N 16°1′48″E
- Country: Croatia
- County: Krapina-Zagorje County

Government
  - Mayor: Matija Lešković (Independent)

Area
  - Total: 48.7 km^{2} (18.8 sq mi)

Population (2021)
  - Total: 4,622
  - Density: 94.9/km^{2} (246/sq mi)
- Time zone: UTC+1 (CET)
  - Summer (DST): UTC+2 (CEST)
- Website: gornjastubica.hr

Gornja Stubica (pronounced [gôːrɲaː stûbit͡sa]) is a village and municipality in Krapina-Zagorje County, Croatia.

== History ==
The first written document about the parish of St. George in Gornja Stubica dates back up to 1209. Right next to the church is the over 400-year-old Gubec lime tree (a protected natural object). Many Legends about Matija Gubec and the peasant revolt of 1573 are associated with it. In the center of the town, on St. George's Square, is the chapel of St. John the Baptist built in the Baroque style. There, in 1999, a memorial bust to Rudolf Perešin, born in the village of Jakšinec, was unveiled.

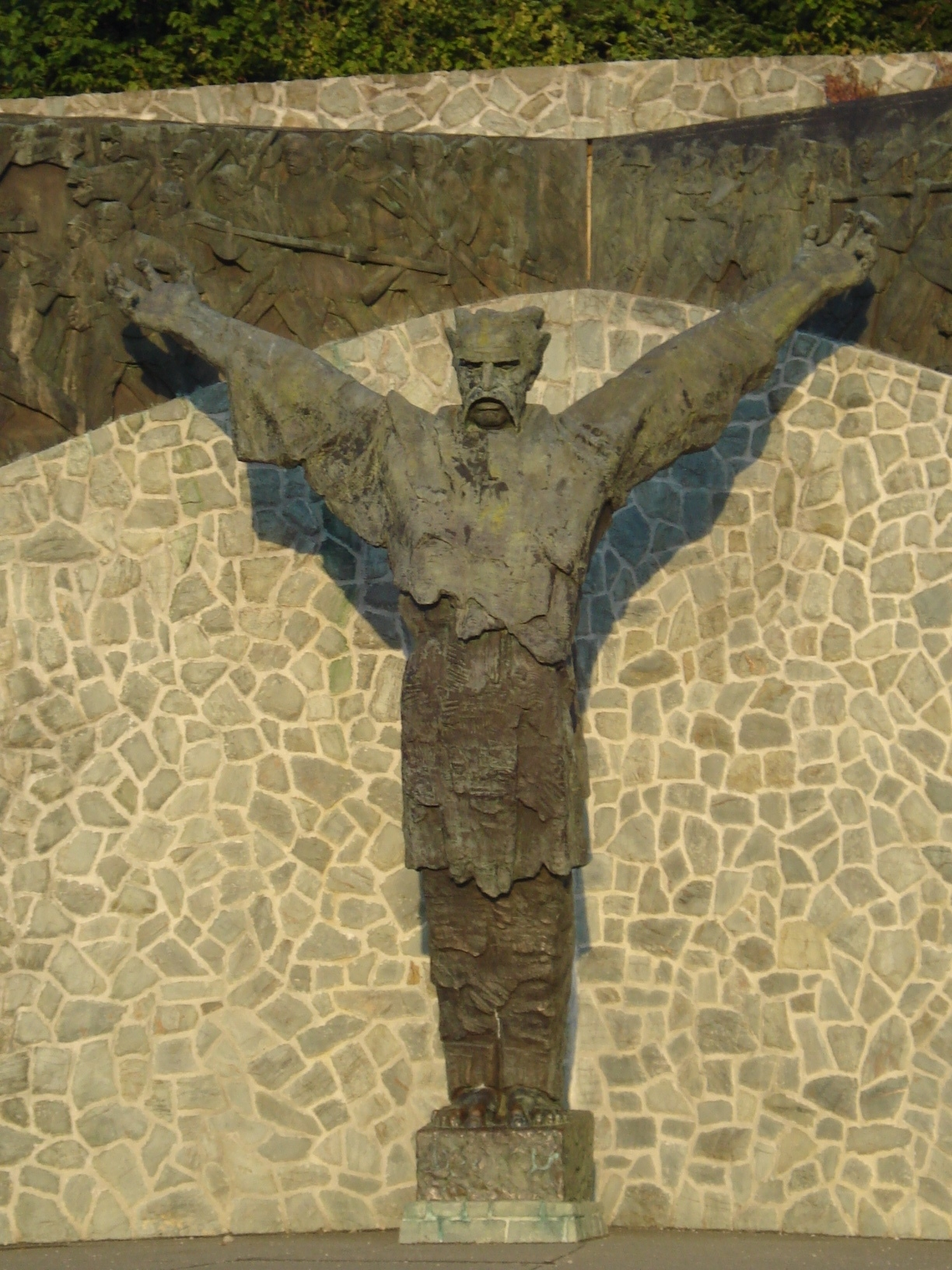
Matija Gubec statue in the 1573 Peasants' Revolt monument in Gornja Stubica made in 1973 by Antun Augustinčić, a prominent Croatian sculptor

== Climate ==
From 1981 to 1996, the highest temperature recorded at the Stubička gora weather station was 33.8 °C (92.8 °F), on 28 July 1987. The coldest temperature was −18.5 °C (−1.3 °F), on 12 February 1985.

== Demographics ==
In the 2021 census, it had a total of 4,622 inhabitants, in the following settlements:

- Banšćica, population 172
- Brezje, population 229
- Dobri Zdenci, population 112
- Dubovec, population 300
- Gornja Stubica, population 747
- Gusakovec, population 190
- Hum Stubički, population 498
- Jakšinec, population 238
- Karivaroš, population 265
- Modrovec, population 324
- Orehova Gorica, population 50
- Pasanska Gorica, population 143
- Repićevo Selo, population 26
- Samci, population 259
- Sekirevo Selo, population 34
- Slani Potok, population 322
- Sveti Matej, population 502
- Šagudovec, population 149
- Vinterovec, population 44
- Volavec, population 18

In the same census, an absolute majority of inhabitants were Croats at 99.37%.

Gornja Stubica: Population trends 1857–2021
v

| population | 4269 | 4715 | 5567 | 6569 | 7144 | 7578 | 7368 | 7969 | 8318 | 8338 | 7927 | 7056 | 6323 | 6104 | 5726 | 5284 | 4622 |
| | 1857 | 1869 | 1880 | 1890 | 1900 | 1910 | 1921 | 1931 | 1948 | 1953 | 1961 | 1971 | 1981 | 1991 | 2001 | 2011 | 2021 |

Sources: Croatian Bureau of Statistics publications

== Administration ==
The current mayor of Gornja Stubica is Matija Lešković and the Gornja Stubica Municipal Council consists of 13 seats.

| Groups | Councilors per group |
| Independents | 6 / 13 |
| HNS | 5 / 13 |
| SDP-HSU-HSS-Reformists | 1 / 13 |
| HDZ | 1 / 13 |

== Notable people ==
- Rudolf Perešin, Croatian military pilot, born on March 25, 1958 in Jakšinec, in the Municipality of Gornja Stubica.

== Twin towns ==
Gornja Stubica is twinned with:

- Slovenske Konjice, Slovenia (since 2013)
