= Dubovac =

Dubovac may refer to:

- Dubovac, Kovin, a village in Kovin municipality, Serbia
- Dubovac Castle, a castle near Karlovac, Croatia
- Dubovac, Karlovac, a section of the city of Karlovac, Croatia
- Dubovac, Brod-Posavina County, a village near Gornji Bogićevci, Croatia

== See also ==
- Dupovac, people named Dupovac
- Dubovec (disambiguation)
