= Single-track railway =

Railway where trains traveling in both directions share the same track

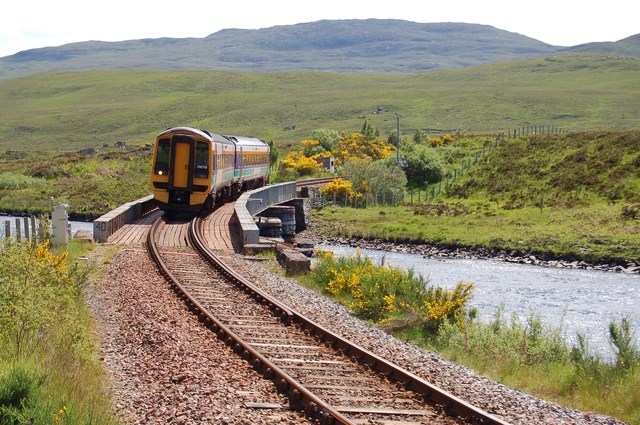
A Class 158 DMU on the Kyle of Lochalsh Line, a primarily single-track railway in Scotland

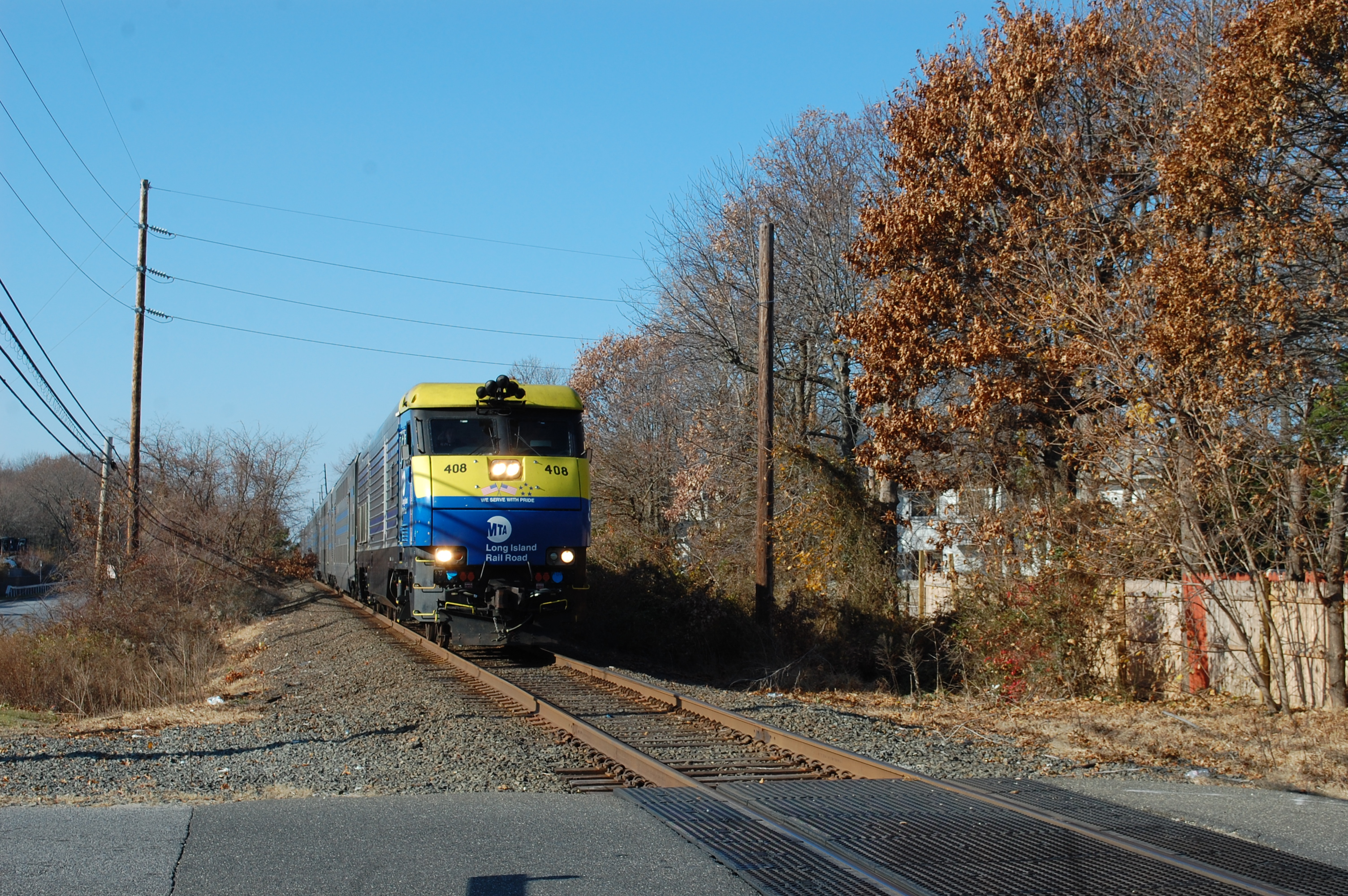
A train on the Long Island Rail Road's single-tracked Central Branch

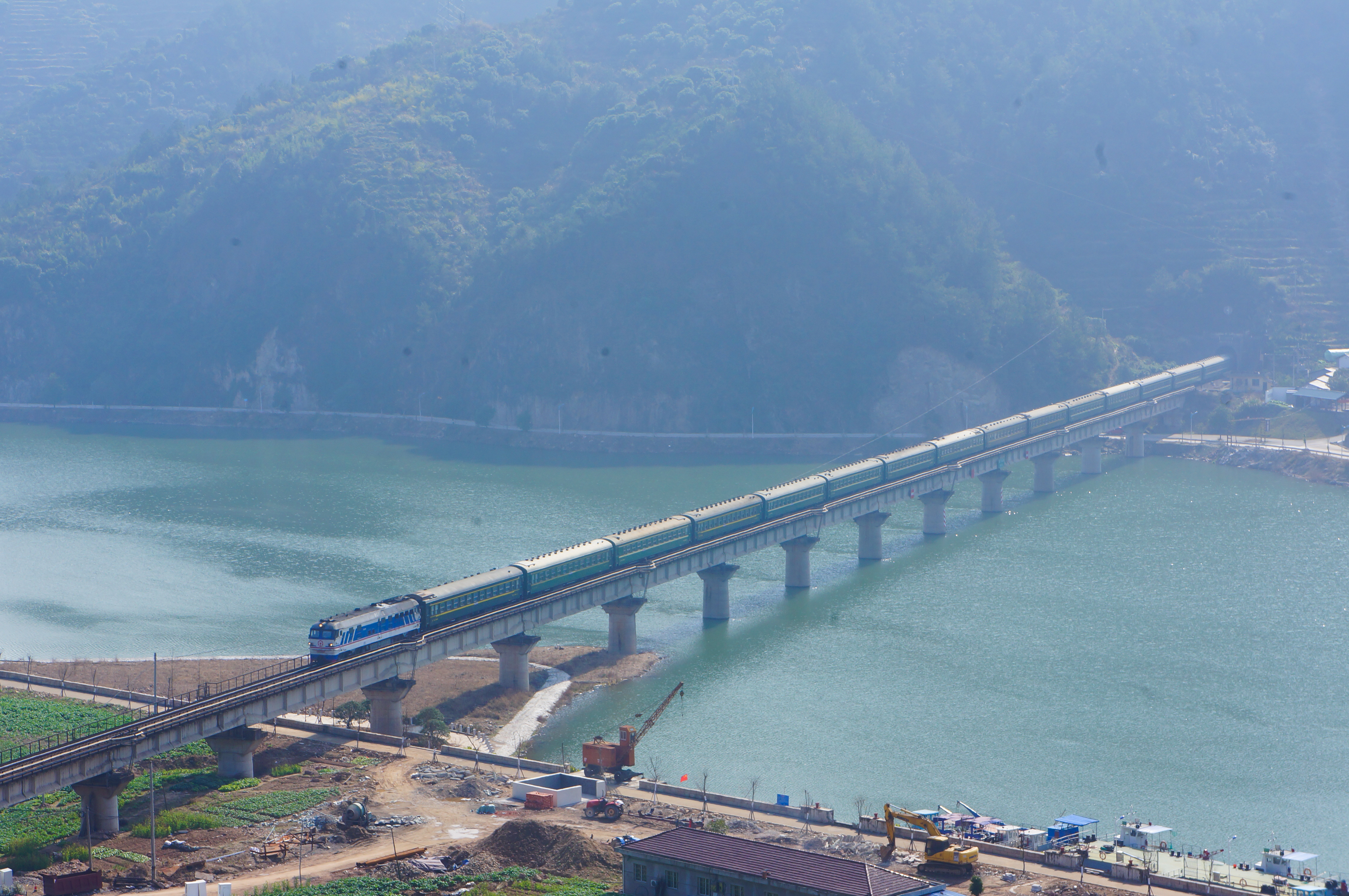
A train on the Jinhua–Wenzhou Railway, a single-track railway in Southern Zhejiang Province, China

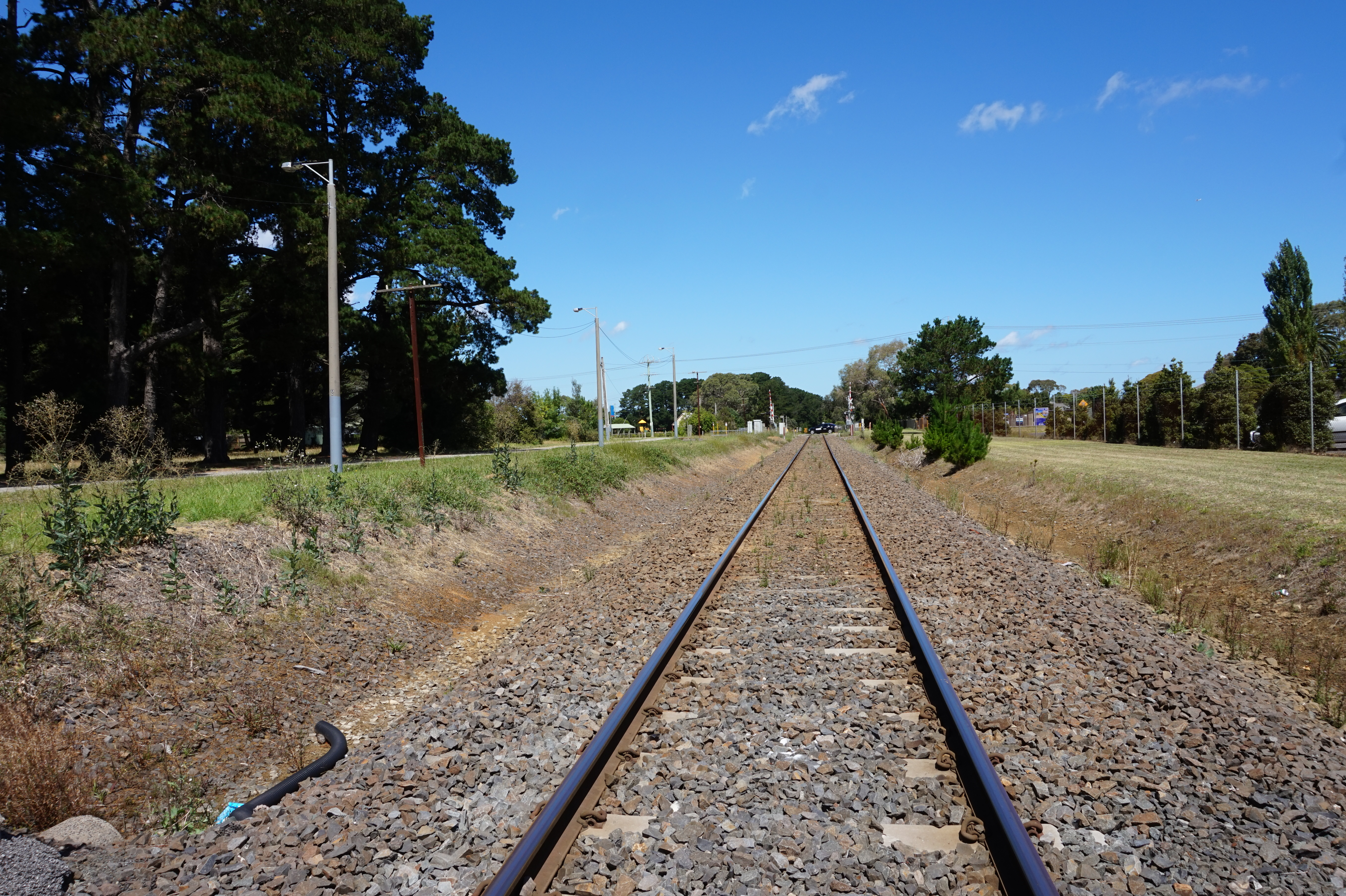
Single track on the Stony Point Line in the Australian state of Victoria

A single-track railway is a railway where trains traveling in both directions share the same track. Single track is usually found on lesser-used rail lines, often branch lines, where the level of traffic is not high enough to justify the cost of constructing and maintaining a second track.

== Advantages and disadvantages ==
Single track is significantly cheaper to build and maintain, but has operational and safety disadvantages. For example, a single-track line that takes 15 minutes to travel through would have capacity for only two trains per hour in each direction safely. By contrast, a double track with signal boxes four minutes apart can allow up to 15 trains per hour in each direction safely, provided all the trains travel at the same speed. This hindrance on the capacity of a single track may be partly overcome by making the track one-way on alternate days.

Long freight trains are a problem if the passing stretches are not long enough. Other disadvantages include the propagation of delays, since one delayed train on a single track will also delay any train waiting for it to pass. Also, a single track does not have a "reserve" track that can allow a reduced capacity service to continue if one track is closed.

== Single-track operations ==
=== Passing loops ===
If a single-track line is designed to be used by more than one train at a time, it must have passing loops (also called passing sidings or crossing loops) at intervals along the line to allow trains running in different directions to pass each other. These consist of short stretches of double track, usually long enough to hold one train. The first train to arrive at the siding must leave the main line to allow the second to pass. The capacity of a single-track line is determined by the number of passing loops. Passing loops may also be used to allow trains heading in the same direction at different speeds to overtake.

In some circumstances on some isolated branch lines with a simple shuttle service (such as the Abbey Line in Great Britain or L202 railway in Croatia) a single-track line may work under the "one train working" principle without passing loops, where only one train is allowed on the line at a time.

Refuge sidings also allow passing of trains on a single-track railway.

=== Safety operations ===
On single-track lines with passing loops, measures must be taken to ensure that only one train in one direction can use a stretch of single track at a time, as head-on collisions are a particular risk. Some form of signalling system is required. In traditional British practice (and countries using British practice), single-track lines were operated using a token system where the train driver had to be in possession of a token in order to enter a stretch of single track. Because there was only one unique token issued at any one time for each stretch of single track, it was impossible for more than one train to be on it at a time. This method is still used on some minor lines but in the longest single-track lines in Britain (e.g. the Highlands of Scotland) this has been superseded by radio communication, known as Radio Electronic Token Block.

In the early days of railways in North America it was common to rely upon simple timetable operation where operators knew where a train was scheduled to be at a particular time, and so would not enter a single-track stretch when they were not scheduled to. This generally worked but was inflexible and inefficient. It was improved with the invention of the telegraph and the ability to issue train orders.

== Doubling and singling ==
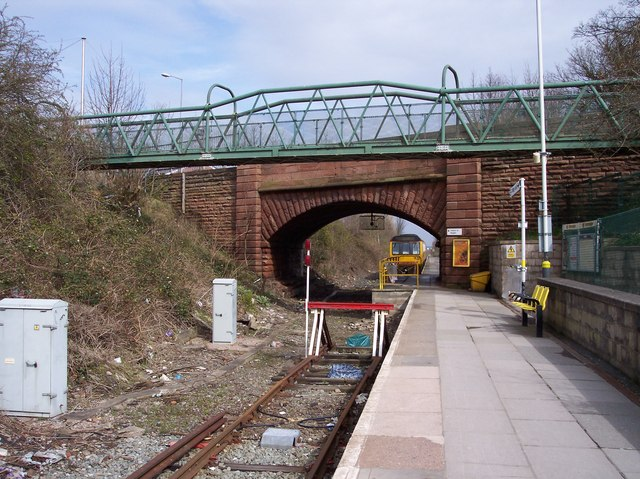
Kirkby railway station single-track railway interchange (former double-track railway)

Converting a single-track railway to double track is called duplication or doubling; converting double track to single track is known as singling. A double-track railway operating only a single track is known as single-line working. Kirkby railway station (until 1977) and Ormskirk railway station (until 1970) were double-track railway, when they were converted into single-track railway with cross-platform interchange.

== New bike paths and railway corridors ==
Building bike trails on rail corridors has occurred in limited examples; however, developing rail rights of way for a bike trail can restrict a train corridor to a single track. Also reclaiming a railway corridor to use trains again limits the use of double tracks. The bike path is usually where the second track would be, and there may be fierce opposition by bikers and hikers. An example of a bike, single-track corridor is the E&N Railway in Victoria, Canada.

== Countries with only single-track railways ==
The European microstates of Liechtenstein and Vatican City each have only one single-track railway line: the Feldkirch–Buchs railway and the Vatican railway, respectively. The railway networks of North Macedonia, Albania, Montenegro and Kosovo are also reported by Eurostat to have no double tracking.
