= Rudolf Perešin =

Croatian fighter pilot (1958–1995)

- Born: 25 March 1958; Jakšinec, PR Croatia, FPR Yugoslavia (modern Croatia)
- Died: 2 May 1995 (aged 37); Stara Gradiška, Croatia
- Burial place: Mirogoj Cemetery
- Military career
- Allegiance: (Socialist Federal Republic of Yugoslavia) Yugoslavia (1981–1991); Croatia (1991–1995)
- Branch: Yugoslav Air Force; Croatian Air force
- Service years: 1981–1995
- Rank: Staff Brigadier (Brigadier General posthumously)
- Unit: 21st Fighter Squadron
- Conflicts: Croatian War of Independence: Operation Flash
- Awards: Order of Duke Domagoj; Order of Nikola Šubić Zrinski; Order of Ban Jelačić; Order of Stjepan Radić; Order of Petar Zrinski and Fran Krsto Frankopan with silver Wattle; Order of Petar Zrinski and Fran Krsto Frankopan with gold Wattle; Homeland War Memorial Medal; Homeland's Gratitude Medal; Medal Flash; Medal for Exceptional Undertakings

Rudolf Perešin (25 March 1958 – 2 May 1995) was a Croatian fighter pilot serving in the Yugoslav Air Force (JRZ) during the 1991–95 Croatian War of Independence who defected to the Croatian side in October 1991, by flying his MiG-21 fighter jet from Željava Air Base to Klagenfurt, Austria, on a reconnaissance flight for the JRZ. He was the first pilot to desert from the Yugoslav Air Force. Following his defection he continued to fly missions for the Croatian Air Force and was shot down in May 1995 by Serb Krajina military forces, resulting in his death.

== Biography ==
Perešin was born in the village of Jakšinec near Gornja Stubica, north of the Croatian capital Zagreb. He enrolled at the Yugoslav Military Pilot Academy in Zadar, and graduated in 1981 at the top of his class as one of the best fighter pilots of the Yugoslav Air Force.

In 1991, during the early stages of the war, Perešin decided to defect in order to help defend his homeland. Like all Croatian-born personnel, he was under close surveillance by his commanding officers. On 25 October 1991 Perešin flew his MiG-21R from the Željava Air Base and landed in Klagenfurt, Austria. His defection as well as his statement that he is a "Croat and I cannot and will not fire upon my Croatia" proved to be a significant morale boost for the Croatian forces.

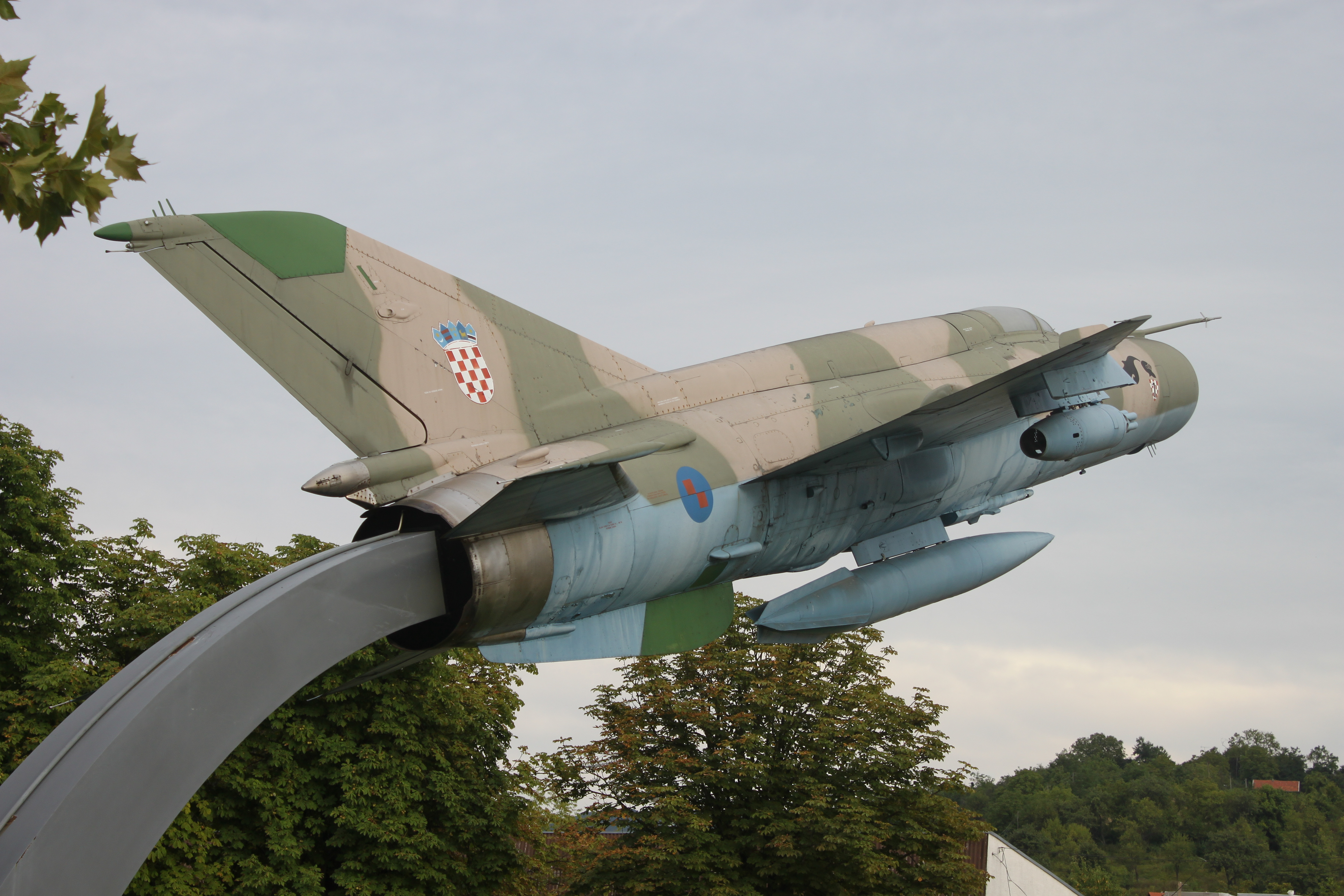
Rudolf Perešin memorial in Gornja Stubica

On 2 May 1995, while providing close air support to the Croatian Army during Operation Flash, he was shot down over Stara Gradiška by anti-aircraft artillery from the Serb Krajina forces. His remains were not recovered and returned until 4 August 1997. On 15 September 1997, Perešin was buried with full military honors at the Mirogoj cemetery in Zagreb.

Today, the Croatian Air Force Flying School in Zadar and the Aeronautical Technical High School in Velika Gorica are both named in his honor.

The MiG-21 aircraft number 26112 Perešin used to defect was moved to the Heeresgeschichtliches Museum (military history museum) in Vienna and briefly shown to the public there. It was publicly displayed at Zeltweg Air Base during the AirPower11 national air show in 2011. After a protracted international ownership dispute, with competing claims from Croatia and Serbia, the aircraft was handed over to Croatia in 2019.
