= Stubička Slatina =

Stubička Slatina Stubička Slatina
- Village
- Location in Krapina-Zagorje County Location in Croatia
- Coordinates: 45°58′34″N 15°52′44″E
- Country: Croatia
- County: Krapina-Zagorje
- Municipality: Oroslavje

Area
  - Total: 7.2 km^{2} (2.8 sq mi)

Population (2021)
  - Total: 560
  - Density: 78/km^{2} (200/sq mi)
- Time zone: UTC+1 (Central European Time)

Stubička Slatina is a village located in the municipality of Oroslavje in Krapina-Zagorje County, Croatia.

== Demographics ==
In the 2011 census, there were 630 inhabitants in Stubička Slatina.

In the census of 2011, the absolute majority were Croats.

== Name Etymology ==
The name Stubička Slatina consists of two Croatian words that refer to the town's geography. Slatina can means marsh and Stubička is the adjective form of the name Stubica which is a nearby settlement. Put together the name roughly indicative to the phrase "marsh nearby Stubica."
