= Eugen Viktor Feller =

Croatian physician (1871–1936)

- Born: 26 January 1871; Greater Lemberg, Austrian Empire
- Died: 15 November 1936 (aged 65); Zagreb, Kingdom of Yugoslavia
- Occupations: Pharmacist, entrepreneur
- Children: William Feller

Eugen Viktor Feller (26 January 1871 – 15 November 1936) was a Croatian pharmacist, entrepreneur and pioneer of the industrial drug production in Croatia.

== Life ==
Feller was born in 1871, in Lwów region (now Lviv Oblast, Ukraine), which after the partition of Poland was at the time a part of Austria–Hungary known as Kingdom of Galicia and Lodomeria, to a Jewish family of David and Elizabeta (née Holzer) Feller. He was married to Ida (née Oehmichen) Feller, with whom he had twelve children, among them William Feller. In the late 19th century, Feller achieved fame with the elixir "Elsa Fluid" (named after his mother nickname, Elsa), whose production along with other cosmetic preparations took place in Donja Stubica. In Donja Stubica, Feller built the pharmaceutical factory, laboratory, and family house with pharmacy. Feller presented "Elsa Fluid" as a cure for all diseases. It was exported in almost all European countries, as well as Egypt, Japan and China, while in the United States it was very popular at the time of Prohibition, due to high percentage of alcohol in its content. Feller was great philanthropist who financially helped the students, poor families, children and various societies. In 1918, he opened a trust fund to help the mothers of soldiers who were killed in World War I. Feller died on 15 November 1936 and was buried at the Mirogoj Cemetery.

== Bibliography ==
- Snješka Knežević, Aleksander Laslo (2011). Židovski Zagreb. Zagreb: AGM, Židovska općina Zagreb. ISBN 978-953-174-393-8.
