= Donja Stubica =

- Town
- Grad Donja Stubica; Town of Donja Stubica
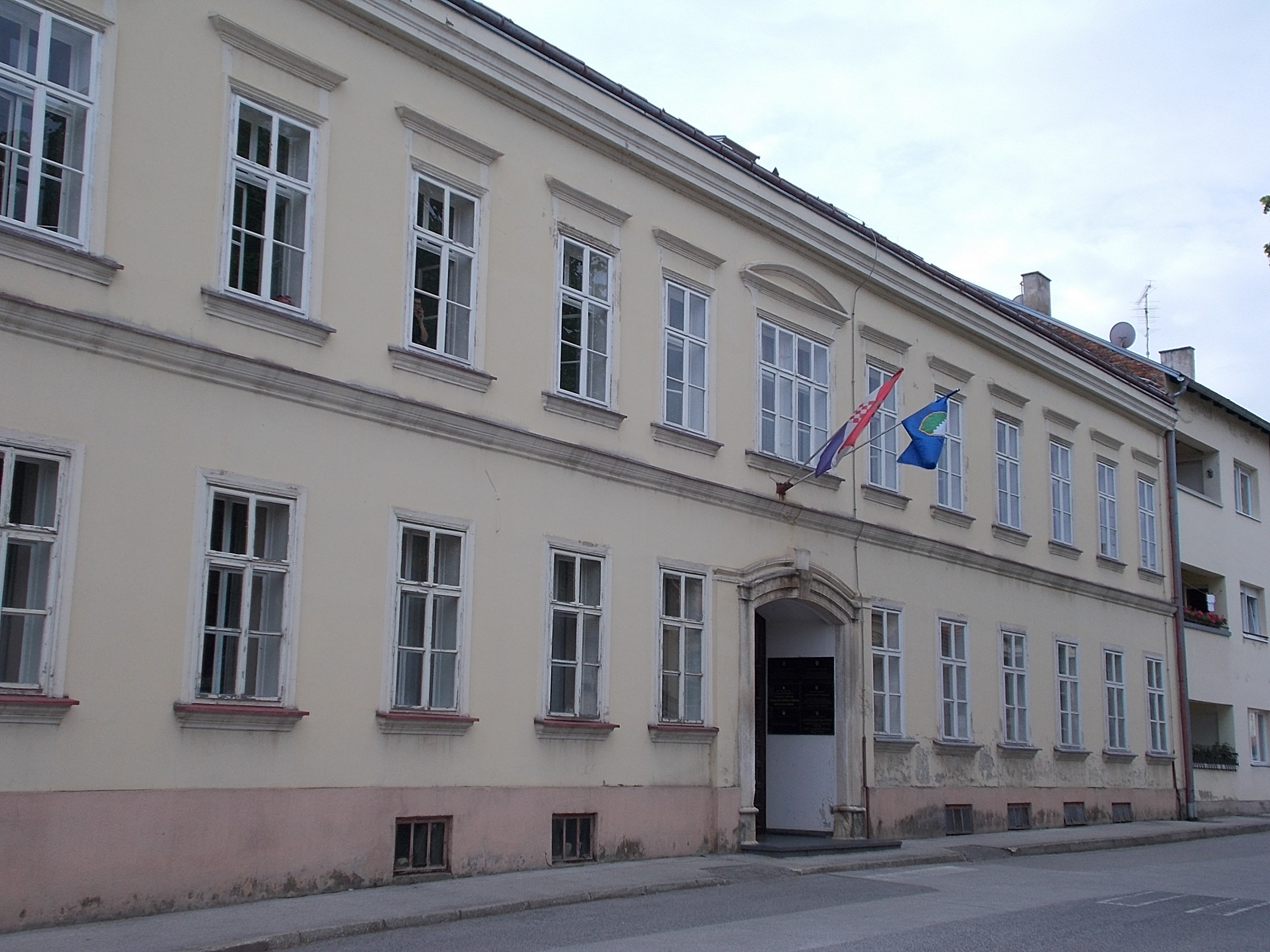
- Donja Stubica town hall

- Location of Donja Stubica Krapina-Zagorje County Donja Stubica (Croatia)
- Coordinates: 45.98°N 15.97°E
- Country: Croatia
- Region: Central Croatia (Hrvatsko Zagorje)
- County: Krapina-Zagorje County

Government
  - Mayor: Nikola Gospočić (Independent)

Area
  - Town: 43.5 km^{2} (16.8 sq mi)
  - Urban: 6.5 km^{2} (2.5 sq mi)

Population (2021)
  - Town: 5,326
  - Density: 122/km^{2} (317/sq mi)
  - Urban: 2,121
  - Urban density: 330/km^{2} (850/sq mi)
- Time zone: UTC+1 (Central European Time)
- Website: donjastubica.hr

Donja Stubica (Croatian pronunciation: [dôːɲaː stûbit͡sa]) is a town in Central Croatia, about 40 kilometres (25 miles) northeast of Zagreb on the northern slope of Medvednica. It is connected by the state road D307 and L202 railway. It is one of the southern-most towns in the Krapina-Zagorje County, which covers the Hrvatsko zagorje mountain region north of Zagreb up to the border with Slovenia.

== History ==
The town was first mentioned in 1209 by Andrew II of Hungary, during the period of Croatia in the union with Hungary. On 9 February 1573 it was the site of the Battle of Stubica (1573) which ended the Croatian–Slovene Peasant Revolt led by Matija Gubec.

Bishop Maksimilijan Vrhovac renovated the castle in Donja Stubica and encouraged employment in brickworks. In the late 19th and early 20th century, Donja Stubica was a district capital in the Zagreb County of the Kingdom of Croatia-Slavonia. In 1899, Eugen Viktor Feller came to Donja Stubica and in 1901 built a pharmacy that significantly helped the economy of Donja Stubica, especially the post office. In 1900, the Agricultural Bank was founded, and in 1905, the Stubica Savings Bank was founded.

The town is the site of four distinguished archaeological finds. In 1993, the municipality of Donja Stubica was established as part of the Krapina-Zagorje County. On the basis of its historical importance, Donja Stubica was given town status in 1997.

== Demographics ==
In the 2021 census, the town had a total of 5,326 inhabitants with 2,121 in the settlement of Donja Stubica.

The town consists of 10 settlements:

- Donja Podgora, population 319
- Donja Stubica, population 2,121
- Gornja Podgora, population 240
- Hižakovec, population 96
- Hruševec, population 368
- Lepa Ves, population 351
- Matenci, population 467
- Milekovo Selo, population 116
- Pustodol, population 811
- Vučak, population 437
Town of Donja Stubica: Population trends 1857–2021
v

population	2955	3063	3482	3738	4151	4629	4458	4860	5439	5802	5732	5535	5569	5771	5930	5680	5326
	1857	1869	1880	1890	1900	1910	1921	1931	1948	1953	1961	1971	1981	1991	2001	2011	2021

Sources: Croatian Bureau of Statistics publications

== Administration ==
The current mayor of Donja Stubica is Nikola Gospočić and the Donja Stubica Town Council consists of 13 seats.

Groups	Councilors per group
Independents	10 / 13
HDZ	2 / 13
SDP	1 / 13

== Culture ==
The Kajkavijana association promotes the conservation and advancement of the Kajkavian dialect spoken along the Kupa and Sava Rivers and the cultural heritage of the region. There is also the Culture and Art Society of Stubica.

== Economy ==
The outlook for the development of Donja Stubica and its region is in the promotion of small and medium enterprises, trade, and tourism. A number of firms known nationwide are located in Donja Stubica, including Metalis, Hidraulika Kurelja, Trgostil, Frassinox, and Perfa. The town also hosts 3-star hotel complex "Terme Jezerčica" with wellness and spa facilities.

== Sports ==
The local Croatian Mountaineering Association's chapter was called HPD "Medvednica", in renewal in 1937, but liquidated on 20 April 1938.

== Notable people ==
- Matija Gubec (around 1548-1573), Croatian peasant and the leader of the Croatian–Slovene Peasant Revolt of 1573
- Eugen Viktor Feller (1871-1936), pharmacist, entrepreneur and pioneer of the industrial drug production in Croatia.
- Stjepan Steiner (1915–2006), physician, cardiologist, major general in the Yugoslav People's Army and personal physician of Josip Broz Tito
- Lujo Margetić (1920–2010), historian
- Željko Matuš (1935-2026), football player, 1960 Olympic champion and European Championship silver medalist

== International relations ==
Donja Stubica is twinned (twin towns — sister cities) with:

- Rodgau, Hesse, Germany in 2002.
