= Stjepan Steiner =

Croatian physician, cardiologist and general

- Born: 16 October 1915; Donja Stubica, Austria-Hungary (now Croatia)
- Died: 18 January 2006 (aged 90); Zagreb, Croatia
- Education: University of Zagreb
- Occupations: Physician; cardiologist
- Spouse: Zora Goldschmidt-Steiner

Stjepan Steiner (16 October 1915 – 18 January 2006) was a Croatian physician, cardiologist, Major general in the Yugoslav People's Army and personal physician of Josip Broz Tito.

== Early life and family ==
Steiner was born into a middle class Jewish family. His father was a veterinarian in Donja Stubica and member of the Croatian Peasant Party. In 1929, he moved to Zagreb with his family.

== Education ==
Steiner attended elementary school in Velika Gorica, and first three grades of secondary school in Šušak. At first Steiner was interested in the veterinary medicine, but his father said he could study anything, just not that. He graduated from the Faculty of Medicine, University of Zagreb. In addition, his brother graduated from the Veterinary school.

== World War II and later years ==
After graduation, Steiner was recruited in the Royal Yugoslav Army and was sent to the Serbian-Bulgarian border. After the army Steiner returned to Zagreb. His pleasant life in the middle-class family was interrupted in 1941, when Ustaše took the power with the Independent State of Croatia establishment. His father was forced to retire from his job position and was sent to concentration camp, but with the help of Vladko Maček he was released. Steiner himself was also arrested and ended up in a detention center in Zavrtnica. He was rescued from the deportation to Nazi concentration camps by physician Miroslav Schlesinger, who organized the departure of the Croatian Jewish doctors to Bosnia, to combat endemic syphilis in 1941. 80 Jewish doctors were sent to Bosnia by Independent State of Croatia authorities, among them Steiner and his wife Zora Goldschmidt-Steiner, one of the most prominent surgeons in the war. Most of those doctors would later flee to join the Partisans. His wife organized surgical teams for Partisans. With Partisans, Steiner participated in the Fourth and Fifth Enemy Offensive.

Steiner meet Josip Broz Tito during the preparation for the second session of the Anti-Fascist Council of the People's Liberation of Yugoslavia in Jajce. He accompanied Tito during his visit in Bari, where Tito meet with Winston Churchill. In 1944 he moved to Belgrade with Tito. Steiner was the personal physician of Tito from 1943 to 1947. In 1947 he asked Tito to be relieved of his duty as his physician. Soon after Steiner returned from Belgrade to Zagreb, where he was reunited with his father who survived the war. Till his retirement, Steiner worked at the Military Hospital in Zagreb. In 1976 he was retired as a Major general of Medical Corps.

He was an honorary member of the Academy of Medical Sciences in Zagreb and internist-cardiologist of international reputation. The last 25 years of his life, Steiner volunteered at a Jewish retirement home Lavoslav Schwarz in Zagreb.

== Death ==
Steiner died in Zagreb on 18 January 2006, and was buried at the Mirogoj Cemetery.

== Bibliography ==
- Snješka Knežević, Aleksander Laslo (2011). Židovski Zagreb. Zagreb: AGM, Židovska općina Zagreb. ISBN 978-953-174-393-8.
- Kraus, Ognjen (1998). Dva stoljeća povijesti i kulture Židova u Zagrebu i Hrvatskoj. Zagreb: Židovska općina Zagreb. ISBN 953-96836-2-9.
- Romano, Jaša (1980). Jevreji Jugoslavije 1941-1945: žrtve genocida i učesnici narodnooslobodilačkog rata. Beograd: Jevrejski Istorijski Muzej, Saveza jevrejskih opština Jugoslavije.
- Goldstein, Ivo (2001). Holokaust u Zagrebu. Zagreb: Novi Liber. ISBN 953-6045-19-2.
