= Samci =

Coordinates: 45°59′13″N 16°00′43″E

- Village
- Interactive map of Samci
- Country: Croatia
- County: Krapina-Zagorje County
- Municipality: Gornja Stubica

Area
  - Total: 1.2 km^{2} (0.46 sq mi)

Population (2021)
  - Total: 259
  - Density: 220/km^{2} (560/sq mi)
- Time zone: UTC+1 (CET)
  - Summer (DST): UTC+2 (CEST)

Samci is a village in Croatia. It is connected by the D307 highway.
