= Dubovica =

Dubovica may refer to:

- Dubovica, Slovakia, a village and municipality in the Prešov Region
- Dubovica, Croatia, a village near Veliki Bukovec, Varaždin County

== See also ==
- Dubovec (disambiguation)
