= Lujo Margetić =

Croatian legal historian

- Born: 17 May 1920; Donja Stubica, Kingdom of Serbs, Croats and Slovenes
- Died: 17 May 2010 (aged 90); Rijeka, Croatia
- Occupation: Historian

Lujo Margetić (18 October 1920 – 17 May 2010) was a Croatian legal historian, member of the Croatian Academy of Sciences and Arts and a professor emeritus of the University of Rijeka.

== Life and education ==
Margetić was born in 1920 in Donja Stubica. He finished the Classical Gymnasium in Zagreb and 1943 joined the Croatian Partisans where as a soldier participate in liberation of Primorje and Kvarner. After end of the war he graduated on the Faculty of Law, University of Zagreb in 1945, where he obtained his Ph.D. in 1946. In 1948 Margetić moved to Rijeka, where he spent 20 years - 1956 to 1976 - working for Energoprojekt, a local company. In 1975 he began teaching at the University of Rijeka, becoming a full professor in 1980. He retired from the faculty in 1989.

== Works ==
Margetić's scientific focus was legal history of Ancient Rome, Greece, Byzantium, and also Hebrew, German, Lombard, Venetian, Serbian and Albanian law and - in particular - legal history of medieval Croatia. He authored more than 400 scientific works, including approximately 50 books.

== Sources ==
- Ravančić, Goran. "In memoriam Lujo Margetić (1920. - 2010.)". Povijesni prilozi (in Croatian). 38 (38). Croatian Institute of History: 355–356.
- Lujo Margetić, F.C.A.
