= Joseph F. Mikulec =

Croatian-American long-distance walker and autograph collector

- Mikulec in the early 1910s
- Born: January 15, 1878; Oroslavje, Croatia
- Died: 1933 (aged 54–55); Genoa Italy
- Occupations: distance walker, autograph collector

Joseph F. Mikulec (January 15, 1878 - 1933) was a Croatian-American long-distance walker known for collecting over 60,000 autographs as he walked over 175,000 miles. He was known as the Globe Trotter.

== Early life ==
Mikulec was born in Northern Croatia in Oroslavje in Hrvatsko Zagorje to Josip Mikulec and Kata Novosel. He worked on the family farm. He left home when he was twenty, traveling to Italy and then Malta where he found work.

== Travel ==
Mikulec subsequently traveled to South Africa and South America, seeing Buenos Aires. He arrived in the US for the first time in 1905. He married Anna Stiopu, a Romanian woman, on June 20th 1908 in Westfield, NY. By the time he petitioned for naturalization in 1910 he stated that he was not married.

At some point after that, he claimed that a Croatian publishing company said that they would give him $10,000 if he could walk around the world in five years and give them an exclusive story. He supported himself selling postcards with his own likeness on them and becoming a brand ambassador for shoe manufacturers.

He was well-known at the time, particularly after his visit to the United States spanning 1908 through 1911 and again from 1919 through 1922. The New York Times wrote about him multiple times and he was the subject of a Pathé newsreel which was shown in theaters all over America.

He traveled for the rest of his life, though in the later part of his life, sometimes by train, collecting autographs and letters from people he met verifying their encounter. These letters and autographs were eventually bound into one thick volume weighting 60 lbs. and containing three thousand pages which could only be carried in a special cart. He visited six continents. He bequeathed his book to Samuel Robinson for the price of $2,500 in 1924 and dropped out of the public eye in 1929. He died in Genoa in 1933.

== Resurfacing of autograph book ==
The book Mikulec carried with him was purchased by Nathan Raab from the Robinson family in 2021. Raab had parts of the books annotations translated, determining that the book showed that Mikulec visited at least 33 countries; there are entries in 23 languages in the album. Raab created promotional materials for the sale of the book including extensive photography and background information. The book, and Mikulec, garnered new attention, being written up in The New Yorker and appearing on CBS News.

The book was purchased by Viktor Šimunić in the name of the town Oroslavje in 2025 for two hundred and twenty-five thousand dollars. The town of Oroslavje erected a statue in Mikulec's honor in 2024.
