= Dubovec, Slovakia =

Municipality of Slovakia

Dubovec Dobóca
- Municipality
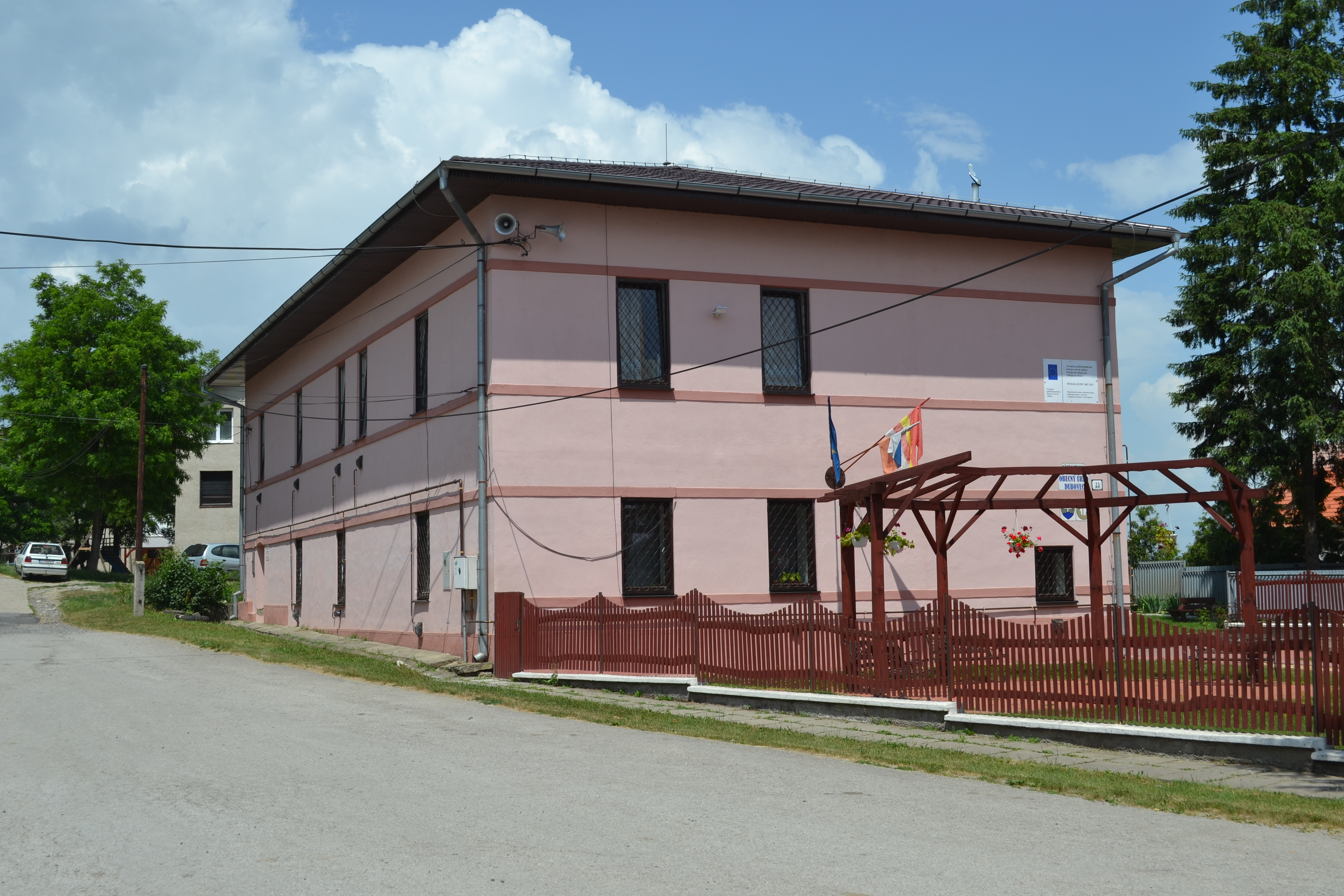

- Flag

- Location of Dubovec in the Banská Bystrica Region Location of Dubovec in Slovakia
- Coordinates: 48°17′N 20°10′E
- Country: Slovakia
- Region: Banská Bystrica Region
- District: Rimavská Sobota District
- First mentioned: 1260

Area
  - Total: 9.19 km^{2} (3.55 sq mi)
- Elevation: 171 m (561 ft)

Population (2025)
  - Total: 521
- Time zone: UTC+1 (CET)
  - Summer (DST): UTC+2 (CEST)
- Postal code: 980 41
- Area code: +421 47
- Vehicle registration plate (until 2022): RS
- Website: www.dubovec.sk

Dubovec (Hungarian: Dobóca) is a village and municipality in the Rimavská Sobota District of the Banská Bystrica Region of southern Slovakia.

== Geography ==
The municipality lies at an altitude of 171 metres (561 ft) and covers an area of 9.19 km^{2} (3.55 sq mi) (2025).

== History ==
In historical records, the village was first mentioned in 1260 (1260 Dabacha, 1336 Doboulcha, 1460 Dobowcha), when it belonged to Blh castle. After it passed to the Szèchy family, in 1683 it was pillaged by Turks. In 1700 it belonged to the Koháry family and then to Muráň town.

== Population ==
Population statistic (10 years)
Year	1995	2005	2015	2025
Count	461	567	542	521
Difference		+22.99%	−4.40%	−3.87%

Population statistic
Year	2024	2025
Count	517	521
Difference		+0.77%

It has a population of 521 people (31 December 2025).

=== Ethnicity ===
Census 2021 (1+ %)
Ethnicity	Number	Fraction
Hungarian	398	78.65%
Slovak	81	16%
Romani	59	11.66%
Not found out	41	8.1%
Total	506	

In year 2021 was 506 people by ethnicity 398 as Hungarian, 81 as Slovak, 59 as Romani, 41 as Not found out, 1 as German and 1 as Other.

Note on population: The difference values of population numbers in the table "Population statistic" and in the sections "Ethnicity" & "Religion" is caused by the use of various statistical methods.

=== Religion ===
Census 2021 (1+ %)
Religion	Number	Fraction
Roman Catholic Church	306	60.47%
None	80	15.81%
Calvinist Church	49	9.68%
Not found out	33	6.52%
Evangelical Church	13	2.57%
Jehovah's Witnesses	8	1.58%
Greek Catholic Church	7	1.38%
Total	506	

In year 2021 was 506 people by religion 306 from Roman Catholic Church, 80 from None, 49 from Calvinist Church, 33 from Not found out, 13 from Evangelical Church, 8 from Jehovah's Witnesses, 7 from Greek Catholic Church, 4 from Other and not ascertained christian church, 2 from Christian Congregations in Slovakia, 2 from Islam and 2 from United Methodist Church.

== Genealogical resources ==
The records for genealogical research are available at the state archive "Statny Archiv in Banska Bystrica, Slovakia"

- Roman Catholic church records (births/marriages/deaths): 1745-1883 (parish A)
- Reformed church records (births/marriages/deaths): 1795-1869 (parish B)

== See also ==
- List of municipalities and towns in Slovakia
