= Krušljevo Selo =

- Village
- Location in Krapina-Zagorje County Location in Croatia
- Coordinates: 45°58′44″N 15°53′46″E
- Country: Croatia
- County: Krapina-Zagorje
- Municipality: Oroslavje

Area
  - Total: 3.6 km^{2} (1.4 sq mi)

Population (2021)
  - Total: 486
  - Density: 140/km^{2} (350/sq mi)
- Time zone: UTC+1 (Central European Time)

Krušljevo Selo is a village located in the municipality of Oroslavje in Krapina-Zagorje County, Croatia.

== Demographics ==
In the 2011 census, there were 523 inhabitants in Krušljevo Selo.

In the census of 2011, the absolute majority were Croats.
