= Mokrice, Croatia =

Coordinates: 46°03′N 16°23′E

Mokrice
- Village
- Interactive map of Mokrice
- Country: Croatia
- County: Krapina-Zagorje County

Area
  - Total: 6.2 km^{2} (2.4 sq mi)

Population (2021)
  - Total: 697
  - Density: 110/km^{2} (290/sq mi)
- Time zone: UTC+1 (CET)
  - Summer (DST): UTC+2 (CEST)

Mokrice is a village in Croatia. It is connected by the D307 highway.
