= Gusakovec =

Coordinates: 46°00′22″N 16°03′29″E

- Village
- Interactive map of Gusakovec
- Country: Croatia
- County: Krapina-Zagorje County

Area
  - Total: 4.8 km^{2} (1.9 sq mi)

Population (2021)
  - Total: 190
  - Density: 40/km^{2} (100/sq mi)
- Time zone: UTC+1 (CET)
  - Summer (DST): UTC+2 (CEST)

Gusakovec is a village in Croatia. It is connected by the D307 highway.
