= Hum Zabočki =

- Village
- Location within Croatia
- Coordinates: 46°01′25″N 15°55′31″E
- Country: Croatia
- County: Krapina-Zagorje County

Area
  - Total: 0.8 km^{2} (0.31 sq mi)

Population (2021)
  - Total: 445
  - Density: 560/km^{2} (1,400/sq mi)
- Time zone: UTC+1 (CET)
  - Summer (DST): UTC+2 (CEST)

Hum Zabočki is a village in Croatia. It is connected by the D1 highway and railway corridors R201 and L202.
