= Banšćica =

- Village
- Interactive map of Banšćica
- Coordinates: 46°00′N 16°02′E
- Country: Croatia
- County: Krapina-Zagorje County

Area
  - Total: 1.5 km^{2} (0.58 sq mi)

Population (2021)
  - Total: 172
  - Density: 110/km^{2} (300/sq mi)
- Time zone: UTC+1 (CET)
  - Summer (DST): UTC+2 (CEST)

Banšćica is a village in Croatia. It is connected by the D307 highway.
