= Dupovac =

Dupovac is a Slavic surname. Notable people with the surname include:

- Amer Dupovac (born 1991), Bosnian footballer
- Zlatko Dupovac (1952–2025), Yugoslav and Bosnian footballer
