= Andraševec =

- Village
- Location in Krapina-Zagorje County Location in Croatia
- Coordinates: 45°59′17″N 15°56′38″E
- Country: Croatia
- County: Krapina-Zagorje
- Municipality: Oroslavje

Area
  - Total: 7.2 km^{2} (2.8 sq mi)

Population (2021)
  - Total: 838
  - Density: 120/km^{2} (300/sq mi)
- Time zone: UTC+1 (Central European Time)

Andraševec is a village located in the municipality of Oroslavje in Krapina-Zagorje County, Croatia.

== Demographics ==
In the 2011 census, there were 859 inhabitants in Andraševec.

In the census of 2011, the absolute majority were Croats.
