= Modrovec =

- Village
- Location within Croatia
- Coordinates: 45°59′49″N 16°0′32″E
- Country: Croatia
- Region: Zagorje
- County: Krapina-Zagorje County
- Municipality: Gornja Stubica

Area
  - Total: 2.1 km^{2} (0.81 sq mi)

Population (2021)
  - Total: 324
  - Density: 150/km^{2} (400/sq mi)
- Time zone: UTC+1 (CET)
  - Summer (DST): UTC+2 (CEST)

Modrovec is a village in Croatia.
