= Lepa Ves =

Coordinates: 46°01′N 15°59′E

- Village
- Location of Lepa Ves in Croatia
- Country: Croatia
- County: Krapina-Zagorje
- City: Donja Stubica

Area
  - Total: 2.5 sq mi (6.5 km^{2})

Population (2021)
  - Total: 351
  - Density: 140/sq mi (54/km^{2})
- Time zone: UTC+1 (CET)
  - Summer (DST): UTC+2 (CEST)

Lepa Ves (Croatian for Beautiful village) is a village in Croatia.
