= Pila, Croatia =

Coordinates: 45°57′00″N 15°56′07″E

Pila
- Village
- Interactive map of Pila
- Country: Croatia
- County: Krapina-Zagorje County
- Municipality: Stubičke Toplice

Population (2011)
  - Total: 175
- Time zone: UTC+1 (CET)
  - Summer (DST): UTC+2 (CEST)

Pila is a village in Croatia.
