= Dubovec, Krapina-Zagorje County =

Dubovec
- Village
- Location within Croatia
- Coordinates: 46°1′16″N 16°0′23″E
- Country: Croatia
- Region: Zagorje
- County: Krapina-Zagorje County
- Municipality: Gornja Stubica

Area
  - Total: 5.8 km^{2} (2.2 sq mi)

Population (2021)
  - Total: 300
  - Density: 52/km^{2} (130/sq mi)
- Time zone: UTC+1 (CET)
  - Summer (DST): UTC+2 (CEST)

Dubovec is a village in the Krapina-Zagorje County in northern Croatia.
