= Hruševec =

- Village
- Location within Croatia
- Coordinates: 46°0′26″N 15°57′53″E
- Country: Croatia
- Region: Zagorje
- County: Krapina-Zagorje County

Area
  - Total: 5.6 km^{2} (2.2 sq mi)

Population (2021)
  - Total: 368
  - Density: 66/km^{2} (170/sq mi)
- Time zone: UTC+1 (CET)
  - Summer (DST): UTC+2 (CEST)

Hruševec is a village in Croatia.
