= Oroslavje =

- Town
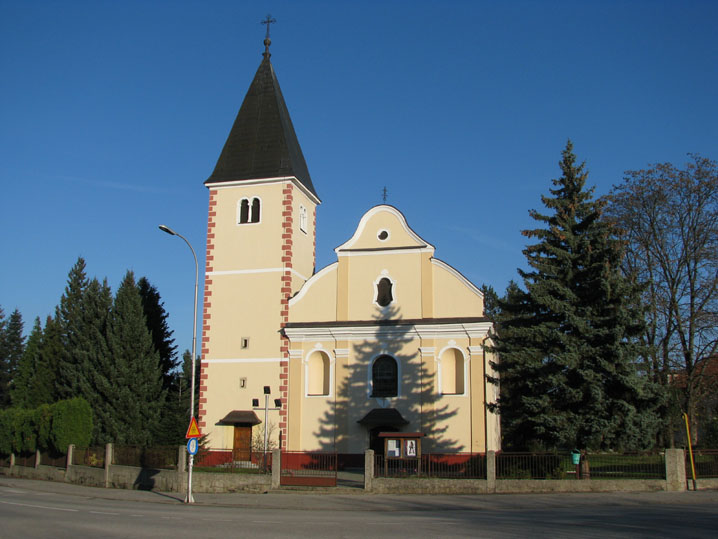
- Church in Oroslavje

- Location in Krapina-Zagorje County Location in Croatia
- Coordinates: 46.00°N 15.91°E
- Country: Croatia
- Region: Central Croatia (Hrvatsko Zagorje)
- County: Krapina-Zagorje County

Government
  - Mayor: Viktor Šimunić (Independent)

Area
  - Town: 32.0 km^{2} (12.4 sq mi)
  - Urban: 7.8 km^{2} (3.0 sq mi)

Population (2021)
  - Town: 5,834
  - Density: 182/km^{2} (472/sq mi)
  - Urban: 3,253
  - Urban density: 420/km^{2} (1,100/sq mi)
- Time zone: UTC+1 (Central European Time)
- Website: oroslavje.hr

Oroslavje (Croatian pronunciation: [ôroslaːvje]) is a town and municipality in Krapina-Zagorje County in Croatia.

Oroslavje is often referred to as The Gate of Croatian Zagorje (Vrata Hrvatskog zagorja) because of its geographical position and its proximity to The City of Zagreb and Zagreb County.

== History ==
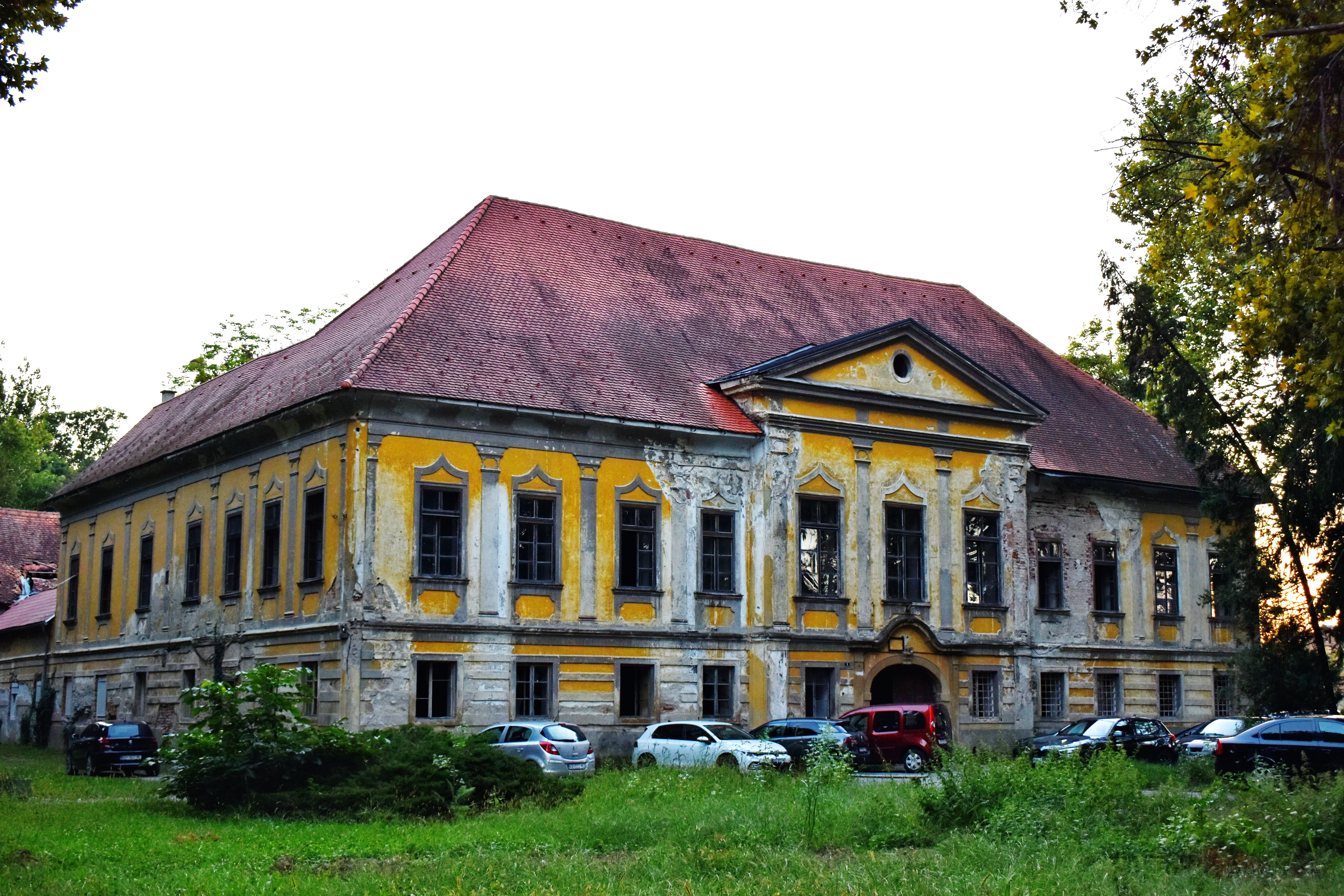
Donje Oroslavje castle

The history of the city is tightly connected with the two castles in the town of Oroslavje. Oroslavje used to have two castles, but now only has one. The castle in so-called "Gornje Oroslavje" or "Upper Oroslavje" used to belong to the Čuklins, followed by the Vranyczanys. It was almost completely destroyed in the fire of 1949 and was later demolished. The only thing saved was the French-style park in front of the castle with a fountain. The second castle that used to be owned by the Vojkiffy family remained whole, but it is currently in bad shape.

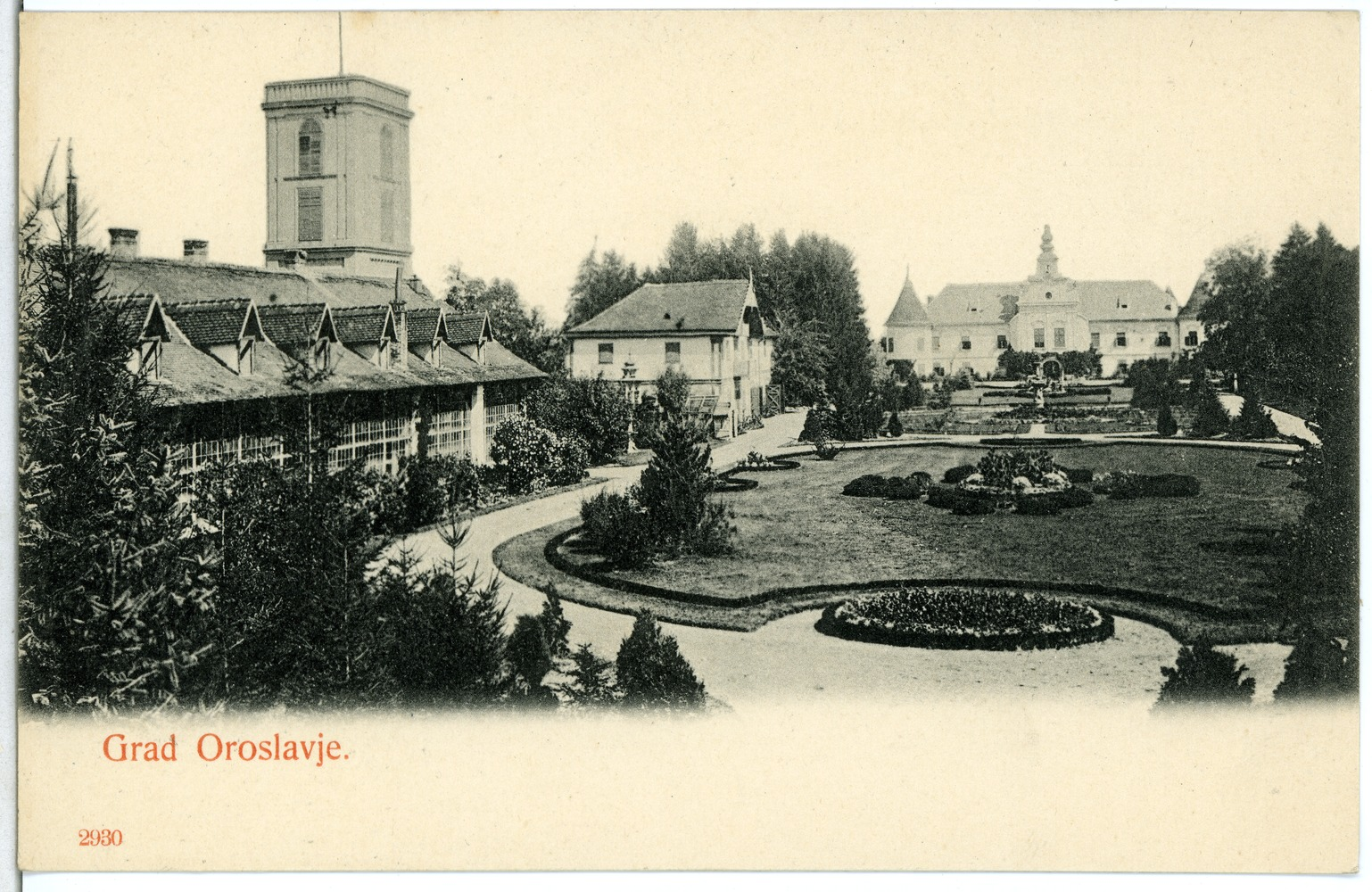
"Gornje Oroslavje" castle in 1903

The Oroslavje church was most likely built in 1652 or 1653. It is first mentioned in historical sources in 1669. Its current shape was made in the beginning of the 20th century. Since 1941 it has been a parish church.

The first textile school in Yugoslavia was founded in Oroslavje in 1927.

In 2025, the city spent $225,000 to acquire a massive book created by farmer Joseph Mikulec, born near Oroslavje in 1878, who walked the world collecting autographs of presidents and kings.

== Demographics ==
In the 2021 census, there were 5,834 inhabitants in the following settlements:

- Andraševec, population 838
- Krušljevo Selo, population 486
- Mokrice, population 697
- Oroslavje, population 3,253
- Stubička Slatina, population 560

In the same census, the absolute majority were Croats at 98.27%.

Town of Oroslavje: Population trends 1857–2021
v

population	2199	2713	3206	3565	3745	3958	4008	4947	5485	5192	5339	5661	6268	6576	6253	6138	5834
	1857	1869	1880	1890	1900	1910	1921	1931	1948	1953	1961	1971	1981	1991	2001	2011	2021

Sources: Croatian Bureau of Statistics publications

== Administration ==
The current mayor of Oroslavje is Viktor Šimunić and the Oroslavje Town Council consists of 13 seats.

Groups	Councilors per group
Independents	11 / 13
HDZ-HSU	1 / 13
SDP-HNS	1 / 13

== Culture ==
The town day is on 11 August. Every year there is a festival held the week of the town day. Typically, there are many attractions, concerts performed by famous Croatian singers and groups, amusement parks, and so on.

== Transport ==
Oroslavje is ~30 min (31 km (19 mi)) from the capital of The Republic of Croatia, Zagreb. Oroslavje has an entrance/exit point to the A2 Motorway connecting Zagreb to the border crossing Macelj/Gruškovje with Slovenia. Oroslavje also has two entrance/exit points to the D14 Freeway in Croatia connecting the A2 Motorway with Zabok, Bedekovčina, finishing in Zlatar Bistrica. Further expansion of the road to the A4 Motorway which could then be used to get to Zagreb or Varaždin is in progress.

It has frequent public transit. Busses and trains are commonly used.

== Education ==
- Elementary school Oroslavje
- District school Krušljevo Selo (Krušljevo Village)
- High school Oroslavje
- Open University Oroslavje

== Sport ==
- Ski running club Oroslavje
- Football club Oroslavje (link to Croatian site)
- Handball club Oroslavje
- Chess club Oroslavje
- Tennis club Oroslavje
- Car-Motorcycle club Oroslavje
- Shooting club Oroslavje
- Hunting club "Mokrice"
- Hunting club "Kuna"
- Paintball club Dum-Dum (link to Croatian site)
- Athletic club Oroslavje
- Bowling club "Obrtnik" Oroslavje

Since 2005 the FIS Roller Ski Cup (link to Croatian site) is held in Oroslavje

== Literature ==
- Obad Šćitaroci, Mladen; Bojanić Obad Šćitaroci, Bojana; Dundović, Boris (2013). "Manors and Gardens in Northern Croatia in the Age of Historicism" (PDF). Centropa. pp. 175–186. ISSN 1532-5563. Archived from the original (PDF) on 2025-05-05.
