= Sveti Matej =

Coordinates: 45°58′N 16°04′E

- Village
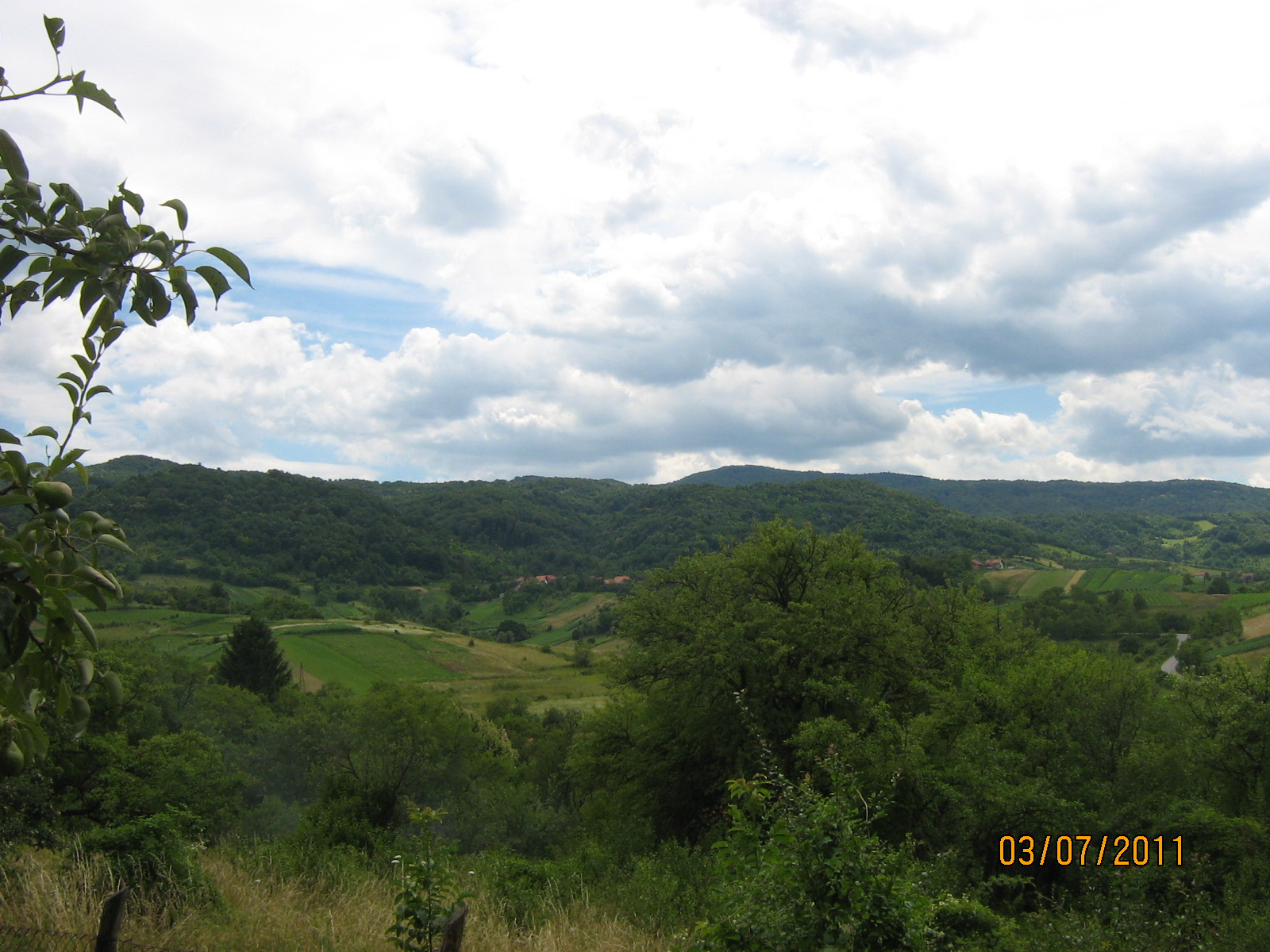
- Interactive map of Sveti Matej
- Country: Croatia

Area
  - Total: 2.7 sq mi (7.1 km^{2})

Population (2021)
  - Total: 502
  - Density: 180/sq mi (71/km^{2})
- Time zone: UTC+1 (CET)
  - Summer (DST): UTC+2 (CEST)

Sveti Matej ("Saint Matthew") is a village in Croatia.

== Description ==
In the village is located an old church dedicated to Matthew the Apostle. In 2001, there were 631 residents of this village.
