= D29 road (Croatia) =

State road in northwestern Croatia

D29 state road

Route information
- Length: 49.8 km (30.9 mi)

Major junctions
- From: D35 in Novi Golubovec
- D24 in Zlatar Bistrica; D307 in Marija Bistrica
- To: D3 in Soblinec

Location
- Country: Croatia
- Counties: Krapina-Zagorje, City of Zagreb
- Major cities: Zlatar, Marija Bistrica

Highway system
- Highways in Croatia

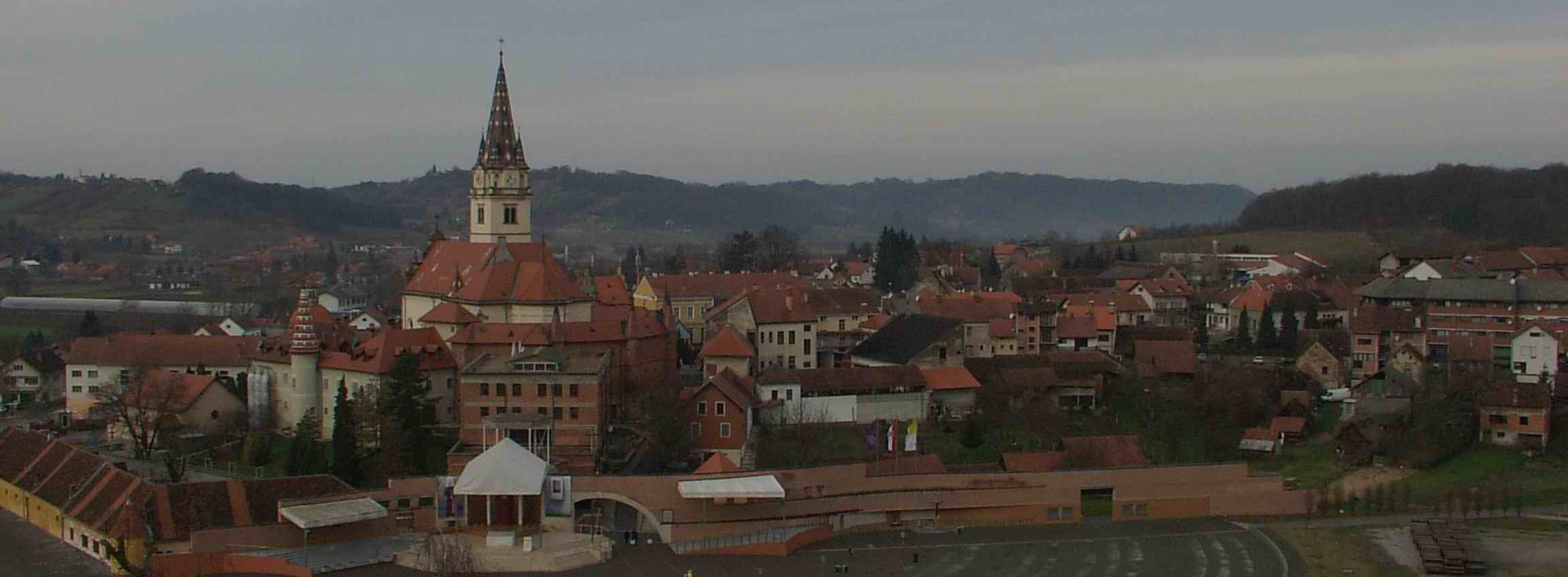
Marija Bistrica, on the D29 road route

D29 is a state road in the northwestern Croatia connecting Novi Golubovec and the D35 state road to Soblinec on the D3 state road near the A4 motorway Popovec interchange. The road is 49.8 km (30.9 mi) long.

This and all other state roads in Croatia are managed and maintained by Hrvatske ceste, the state-owned company.

== Traffic volume ==
Traffic is regularly counted and reported by Hrvatske ceste, operator of the road.

D29 traffic volume
Road	Counting site	AADT	ASDT	Notes
D29	1232 Mače - east	3,147	3,217	Between the Ž2168 and Ž2128 junctions.
D29	1231 Zlatar Bistrica	3,163	3,501	Between the D24 and Ž2202 junctions.
D29	2004 Kašina	2,198	2,331	Adjacent to the Ž1001 junction.

== Road junctions and populated areas ==
D29 junctions/populated areas
Type	Slip roads/Notes
	Novi Golubovec; D35 to Lepoglava and Varaždin (D2) (to the east) and to Sveti Križ Začretje (D1) (to the west). The northern terminus of the road.
	Ž2127 to Gora Veternička.
	Ž2126 to Gregurovec and Mihovljan.
	Ž2128 to Lobor and Ladislavec.
	Velika Petrovagorska
	Peršaves
	Ž2125 to Sutinske Toplice and Mihovljan.
	Mače; Ž2168 to Mali Bukovec and Poznanovec (D24).
	Cetinovec; Ž2128 to Ladislavec and Lobor.
	Zlatar; Ž2169 to Gornja Batina and Budinšćina (D24).
	Zlatar Bistrica; D24 to Zabok (D1) (to the west) and to Novi Marof (D3) and Ludbreg (D2) (to the east).
	Tugonica; Ž2202 to Podgrađe.
	Marija Bistrica; D307 to Oroslavje and Gubaševo (D1). Ž2221 to Donje Orešje and Hrastje (D3). Ž2227 to Podgorje Bistričko.
	Ž1006 to Adamovec.
	Laz Bistrički
	Laz Stubički
	Ž2224 to Sveti Matej and Gornja Stubica.
	Kašina
	Prepuštovec
	Vurnovec
	Gajec
	Soblinec; D3 to Sveti Ivan Zelina (to the north) and to the A4 motorway Popovec interchange (to the south). The southern terminus of the road.
