= Lovrečan =

Lovrečan may refer to:

- Lovrečan, Krapina-Zagorje County, a village near Zlatar Bistrica, Croatia
- Lovrečan, Varaždin County, a village near Ivanec, Croatia
- Veliki Lovrečan, a village near Cestica, Varaždin County, Croatia
- Mali Lovrečan, a village near Cestica, Varaždin County, Croatia
