= Ervenik Zlatarski =

Ervenik Zlatarski may refer to the following places in Croatia

- Ervenik Zlatarski, Zlatar
- Ervenik Zlatarski, Zlatar Bistrica
