= Zlatar-Bistrica =

- Municipality
- Location of Zlatar-Bistrica in Croatia
- Coordinates: 46°05′10″N 16°04′34″E
- Country: Croatia
- County: Krapina-Zagorje County

Government
  - Municipal Mayor: Dražen Mikulec (SDP)

Area
  - Municipality: 24.7 km^{2} (9.5 sq mi)
  - Urban: 6.2 km^{2} (2.4 sq mi)

Population (2021)
  - Municipality: 2,308
  - Density: 93.4/km^{2} (242/sq mi)
  - Urban: 1,393
  - Urban density: 220/km^{2} (580/sq mi)
- Website: zlatar-bistrica.hr

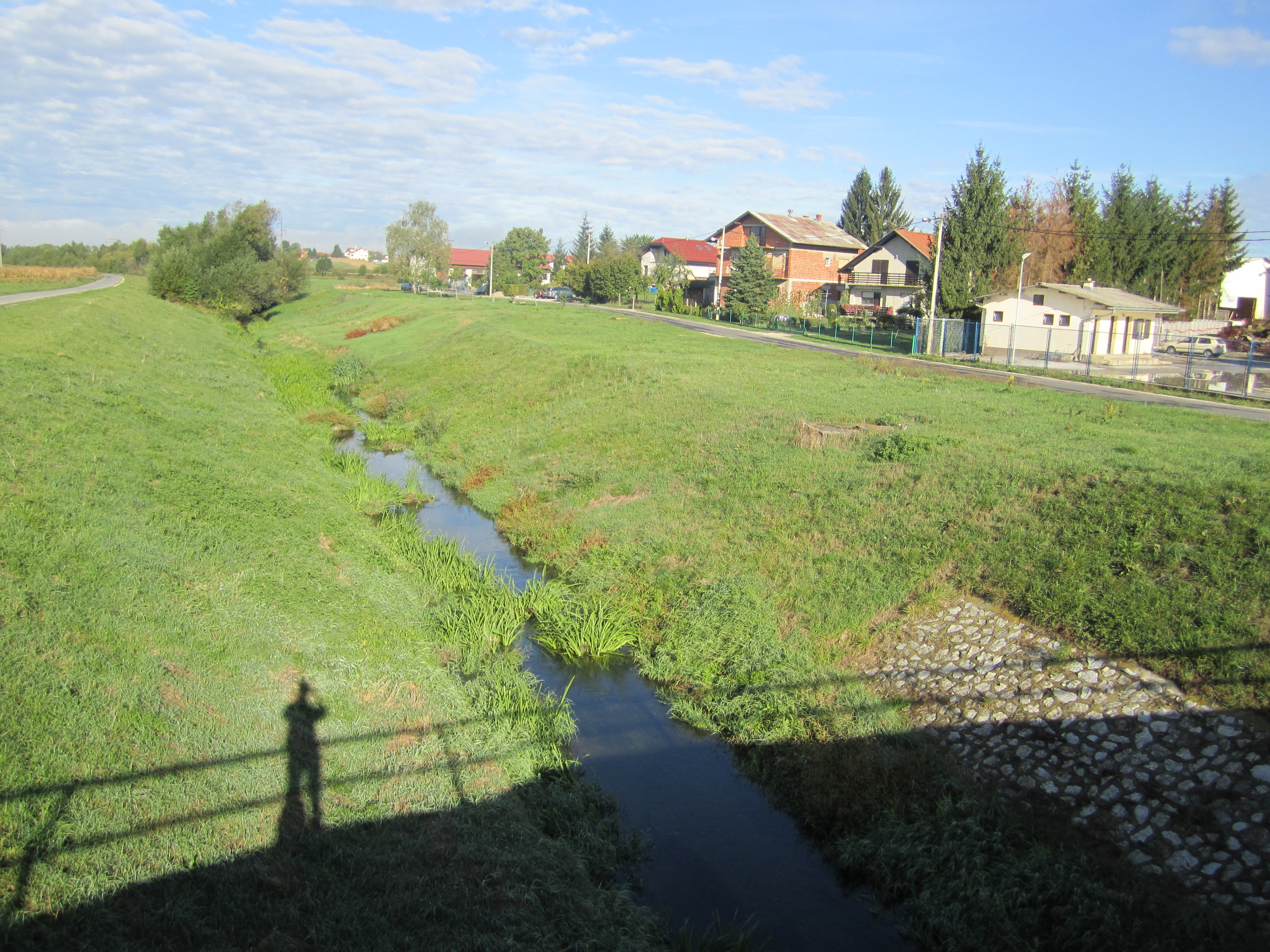
Zlatar-Bistrica and upper Krapina

Zlatar-Bistrica is a village and municipality in northwestern Croatia, in the Krapina-Zagorje County. It lies on the crossroads of two important roads for the region, one connecting northern parts of the county with Zagreb (D29) and the other connecting Varaždin and western part of the county (D24) and is also connected by R201 railway.

== History ==
The present-day municipality of Zlatar Bistrica was formed by merging the hamlets of Donji Brestovec, Gornji Brestovec and Grančari. The town, along with the settlements, was formed around the newly created railway station on the Zagreb-Varaždin railway in 1911. The station, and thus the settlement located nearby, got its name from the combination of the two nearest larger towns between which it is located – Zlatar and Marija Bistrica.

From 1962 until 1991 Zlatar Bistrica was the largest municipality in Hrvatsko Zagorje with approximately 33,000 inhabitants. The municipal seat was located in the center of Zlatar Bistrica, and the municipality itself included the present-day towns and municipalities of Budinščina, Hrašćina, Konjščina, Lobor, Mihovljan, Novi Golubovec, Mače, Zlatar and Zlatar Bistrica.

== Demographics ==
In the 2021 census, the municipality had a total population of 2,308 inhabitants, in the following settlements:

- Ervenik, population 64
- Lipovec, population 160
- Lovrečan, population 362
- Opasanjek, population 82
- Veleškovec, population 247
- Zlatar-Bistrica, population 1,393
Zlatar-Bistrica: Population trends 1857–2021
v

population	1084	1342	1455	1799	2126	2416	2605	2665	2599	2610	2584	2552	2598	2670	2830	2600	2308
	1857	1869	1880	1890	1900	1910	1921	1931	1948	1953	1961	1971	1981	1991	2001	2011	2021

Sources: Croatian Bureau of Statistics publications

== Administration ==
The current mayor of Zlatar-Bistrica is Dražen Mikulec (SDP) and the Zlatar-Bistrica Municipal Council consists of 9 seats.

Groups	Councilors per group
SDP-HSS	4 / 9
Independents	3 / 9
HDZ	2 / 9

== Culture ==
- Cultural and artistic educational association „KAJ“, Zlatar Bistrica
- Hunting Association "Šljuka" Zlatar Bistrica
- Croatian Mountaineering Association "Javor"
- Eco-association "Lijepa naša", Zlatar Bistrica
- Wind Orchestra of the Municipality of Zlatar Bistrica

== Sport ==
- NK "Ivančica", football team established in 1994.
- RK "Zlatar-Bistrica", handball team for men.
- ŽRK "Zlatar-Bistrica", handball team for women.
