= Marija Bistrica =

- Municipality
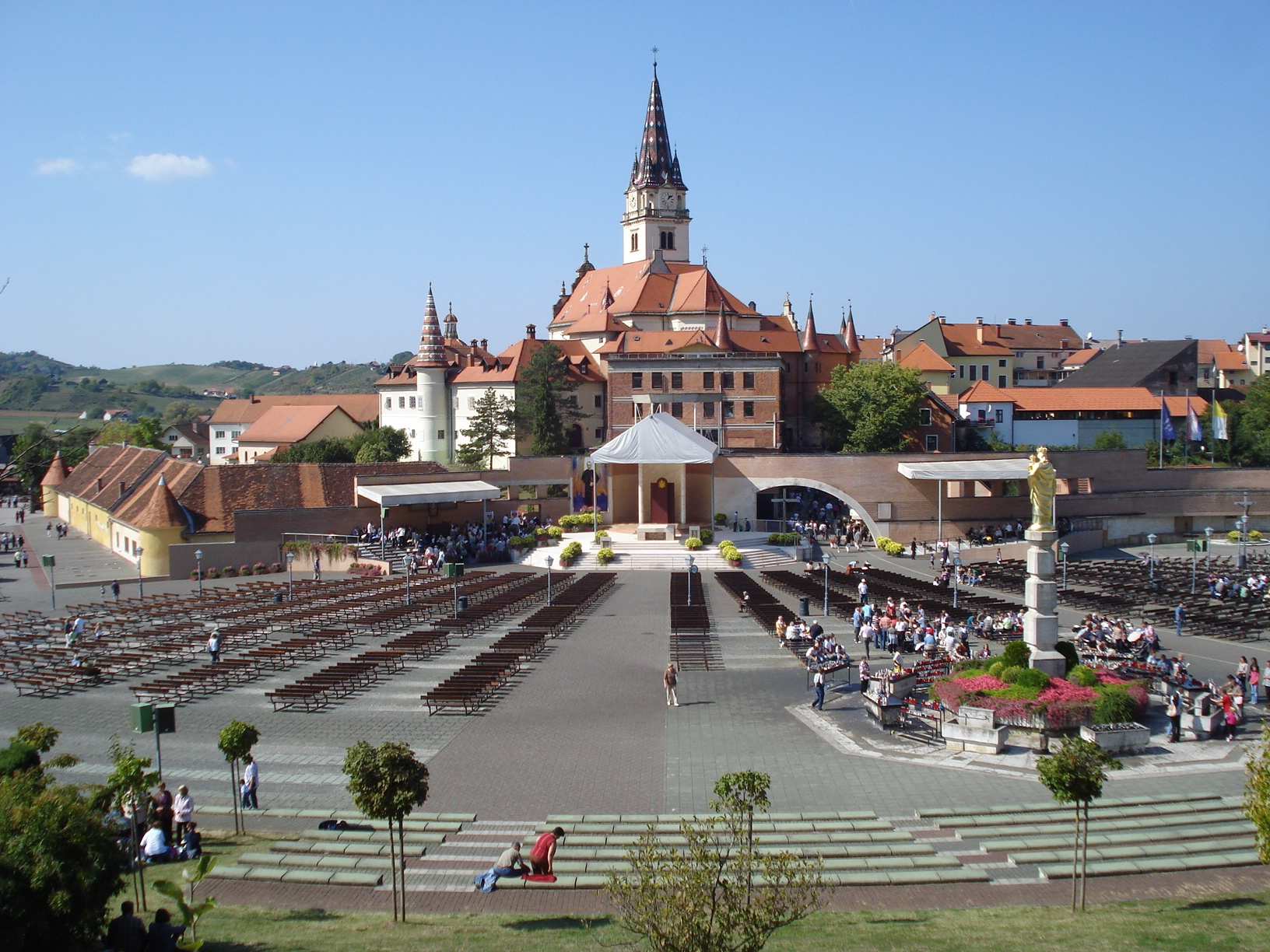
- View of Marija Bistrica

- Location of Marija Bistrica within Croatia
- Coordinates: 46°0′19″N 16°07′07″E
- Country: Croatia
- County: Krapina-Zagorje County

Government
  - Municipal Mayor: Josip Milički (HDZ)

Area
  - Municipality: 68.6 km^{2} (26.5 sq mi)
  - Urban: 4.0 km^{2} (1.5 sq mi)
- Elevation: 192 m (630 ft)

Population (2021)
  - Municipality: 5,553
  - Density: 80.9/km^{2} (210/sq mi)
  - Urban: 1,045
  - Urban density: 260/km^{2} (680/sq mi)
- Time zone: UTC+1 (CET)
  - Summer (DST): UTC+2 (CEST)
- Postal code: 49 246
- Area code: 049
- Website: marija-bistrica.hr

Marija Bistrica (Croatian pronunciation: [mǎrija bîstrit͡sa]) is a village and municipality in the Krapina-Zagorje County in central Croatia, located on the slopes of the Medvednica mountain in the Hrvatsko Zagorje region north of the capital Zagreb. The municipality has 5,553 inhabitants, with 1,045 residents in the settlement itself (2021 census).

Marija Bistrica has an old Marian shrine of the Black Madonna which is a place of pilgrimage and visited by hundreds of thousands of pilgrims every year. On 3 October 1998, Pope John Paul II visited Marija Bistrica and beatified Croatian Cardinal Aloysius Stepinac in front of a crowd of 500,000 Croatians.

== History ==
The first written mention of the settlement Bistrica dates back to 1209 AD, as the possession of Croatian-Hungarian king Andrew II. Documents from 1334 first mention the church of Saints Peter and Paul.

In 1545 a local priest hid the wonder working statue of the Blessed Virgin Mary with the Infant Jesus, which previously stood in a wooden chapel on the Vinski Vrh (Hill) nearby, within the church to save it from the Turks. The statue was discovered in 1588, when according to the records bright light shone from the place where it was buried. In 1650 the statue had to be once again hidden, only to be rediscovered in 1684.

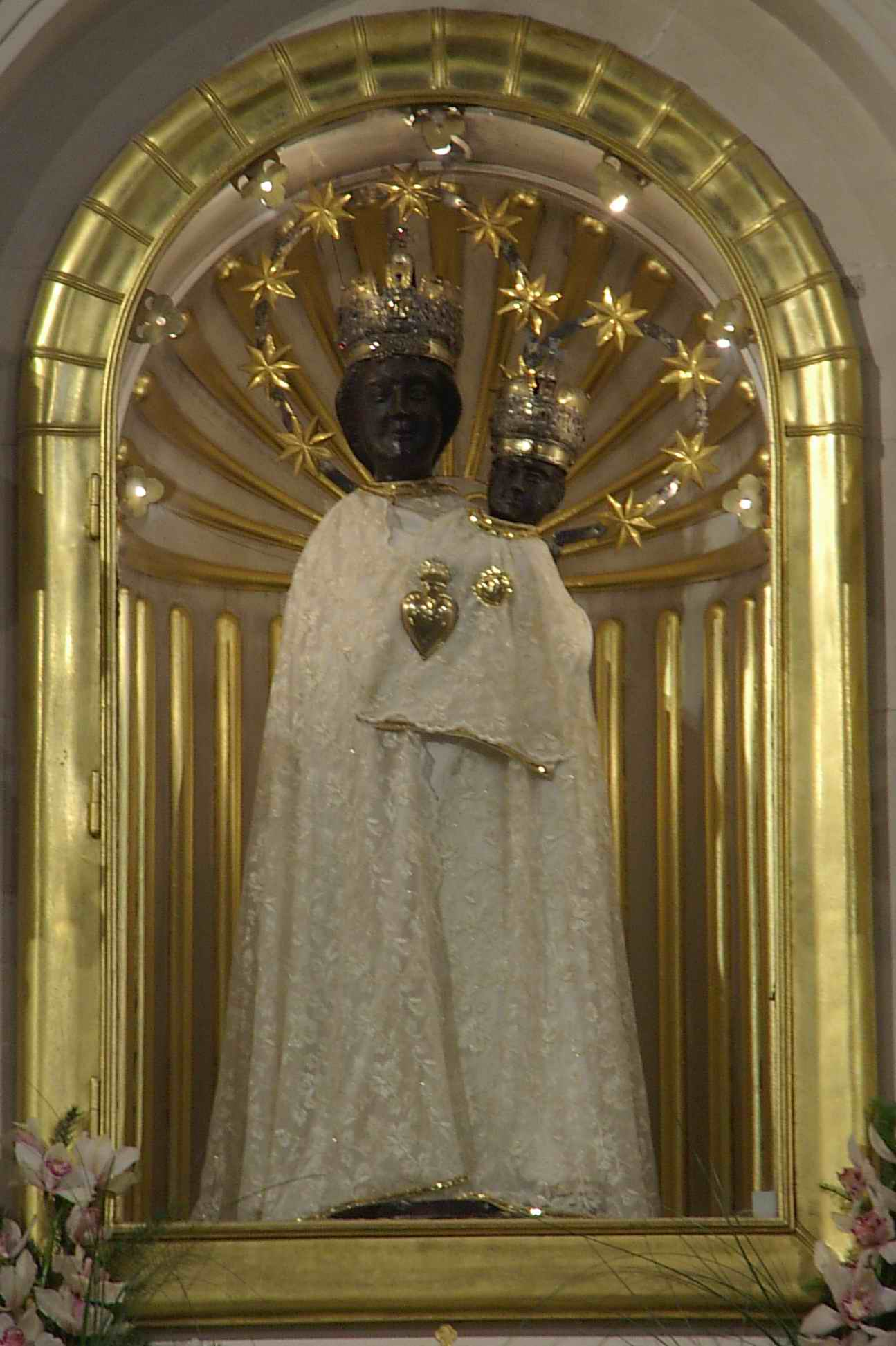
The Black Madonna statue.

In 1710 the Croatian parliament vowed to fund a new altar in the church, which was done in 1715. In 1731 the church was expanded and reconsecrated to Our Lady of the Snows. In 1750 Pope Benedict XIV granted plenary indulgence to pilgrims who confess and accept the Eucharist in Bistrica. From 1879 to 1882 a new church was built in its place, designed in the style of Neo-Renaissance by Hermann Bollé. Arcades were constructed around the church decorated with 22 paintings of the miracles granted by the Blessed Virgin. During the construction a fire destroyed all of the church except the statue and the main altar. In 1923 Pope Pius XI granted the church the status of a minor basilica and in 1935 the archbishop of Zagreb Ante Bauer crowned the statue as Our Lady Queen of Croatia. As archbishop, Aloysius Stepinac paid special attention to the site and made annual pilgrimages. On 8 July 1945 he led his last pilgrimage to Marija Bistrica which drew 40,000-50,000 people.

== Demographics ==
In the 2021 census, the municipality had a total of 5,553 inhabitants, in the following settlements:

- Globočec, population 490
- Hum Bistrički, population 430
- Laz Bistrički, population 742
- Laz Stubički, population 220
- Marija Bistrica, population 1,045
- Podgorje Bistričko, population 849
- Podgrađe, population 302
- Poljanica Bistrička, population 292
- Selnica, population 596
- Sušobreg Bistrički, population 70
- Tugonica, population 517
Marija Bistrica: Population trends 1857–2021
v

population	5185	5779	6526	7544	8559	9741	9630	9968	10334	9874	9223	8320	7448	7012	6612	5976	5553
	1857	1869	1880	1890	1900	1910	1921	1931	1948	1953	1961	1971	1981	1991	2001	2011	2021

Sources: Croatian Bureau of Statistics publications

== Administration ==
The current mayor of Marija Bistrica is Josip Milički and the Marija Bistrica Municipal Council consists of 13 seats.

Groups	Councilors per group
HDZ-HSU	7 / 13
HSS-SDP-HNS	6 / 13

== Gallery ==
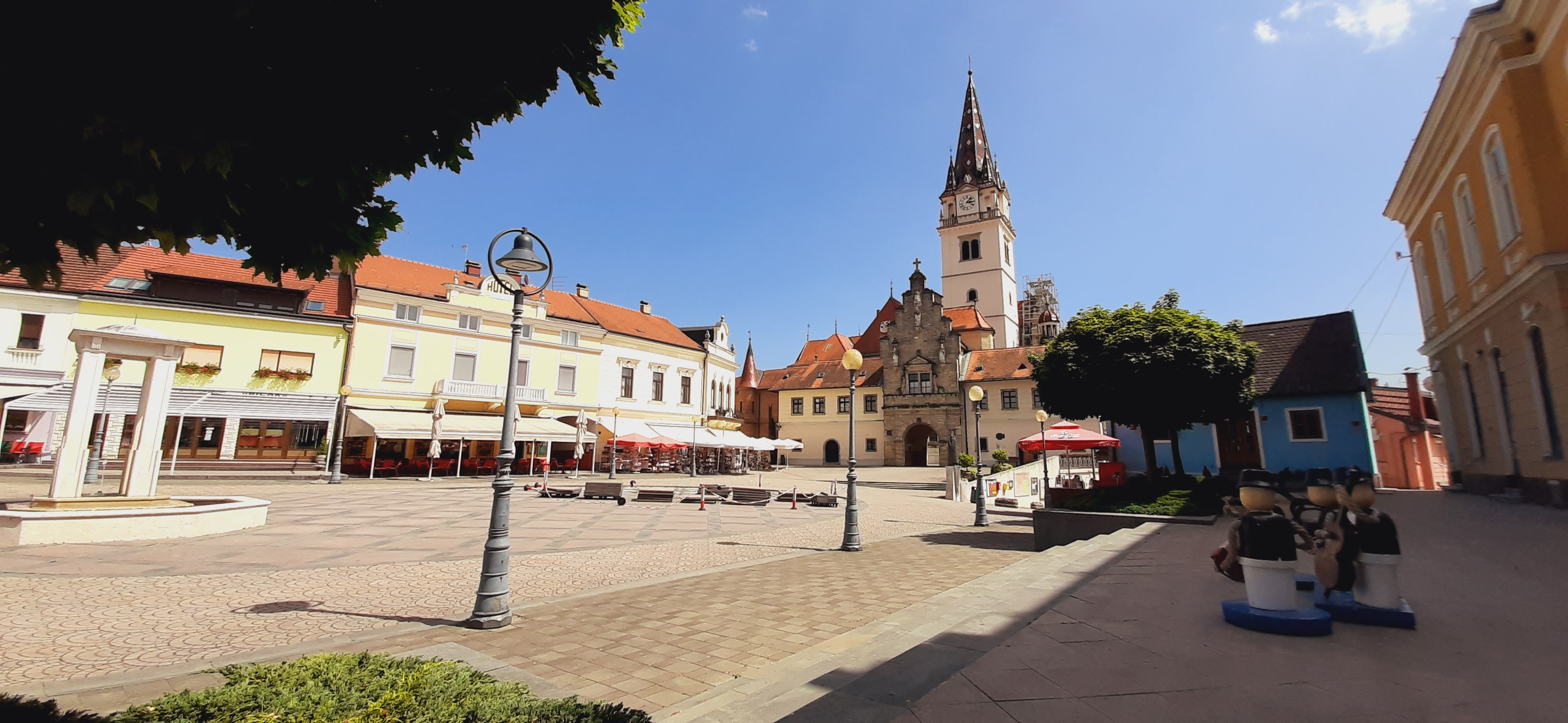
Main square in Marija Bistrica

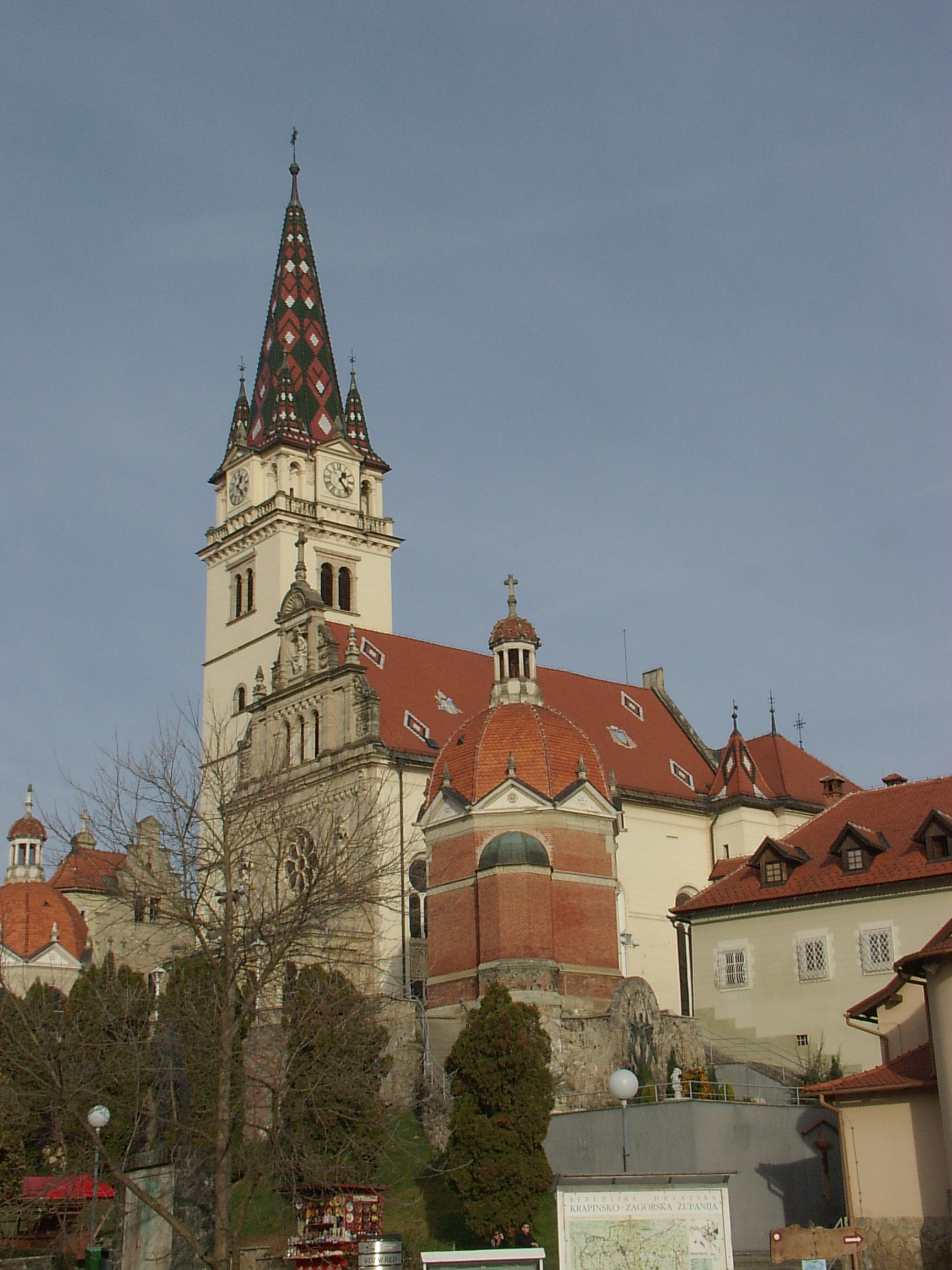
The basilica

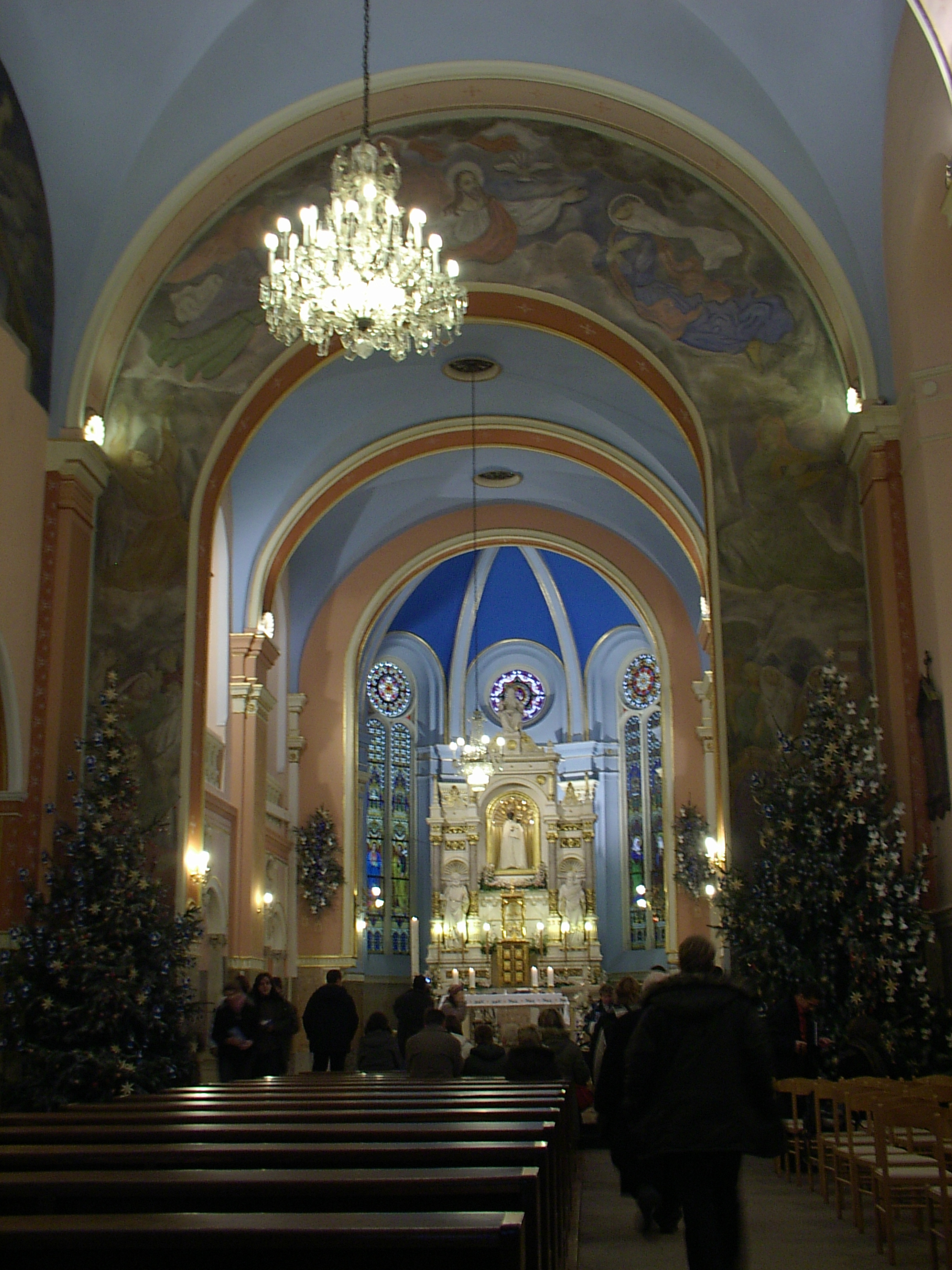
Interior of the basilica

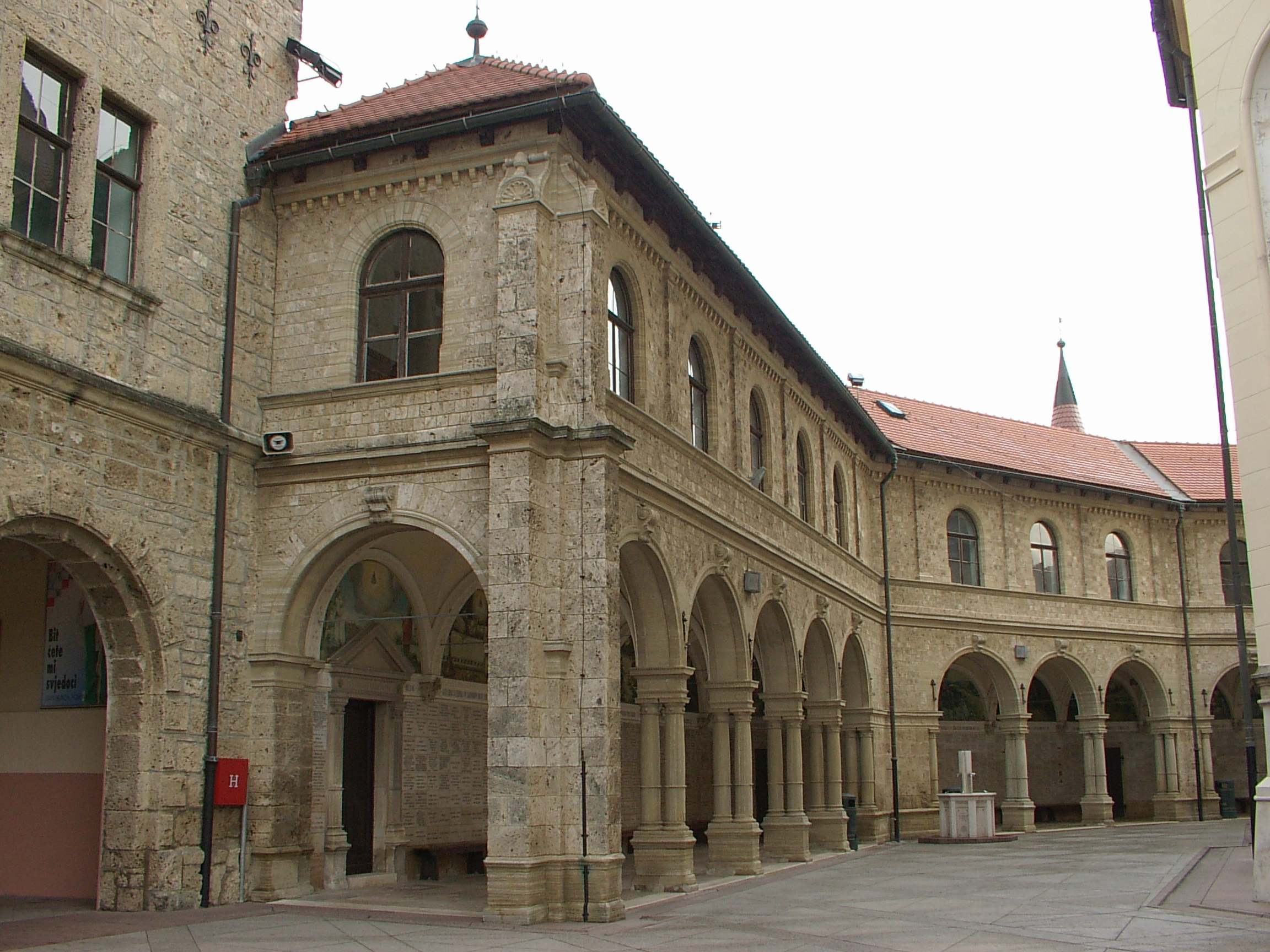
Arcades surround the basilica

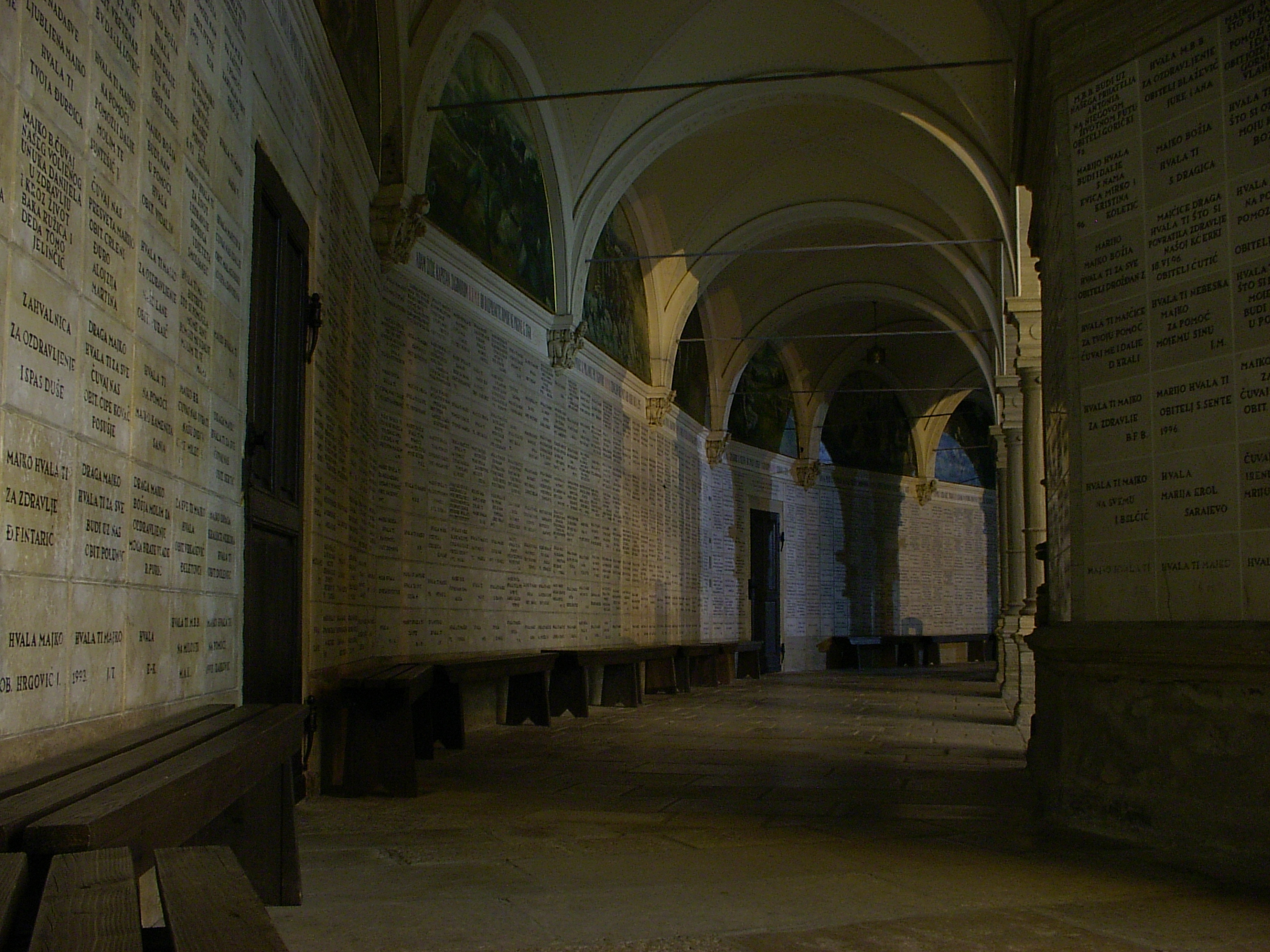
Arcades surround the basilica

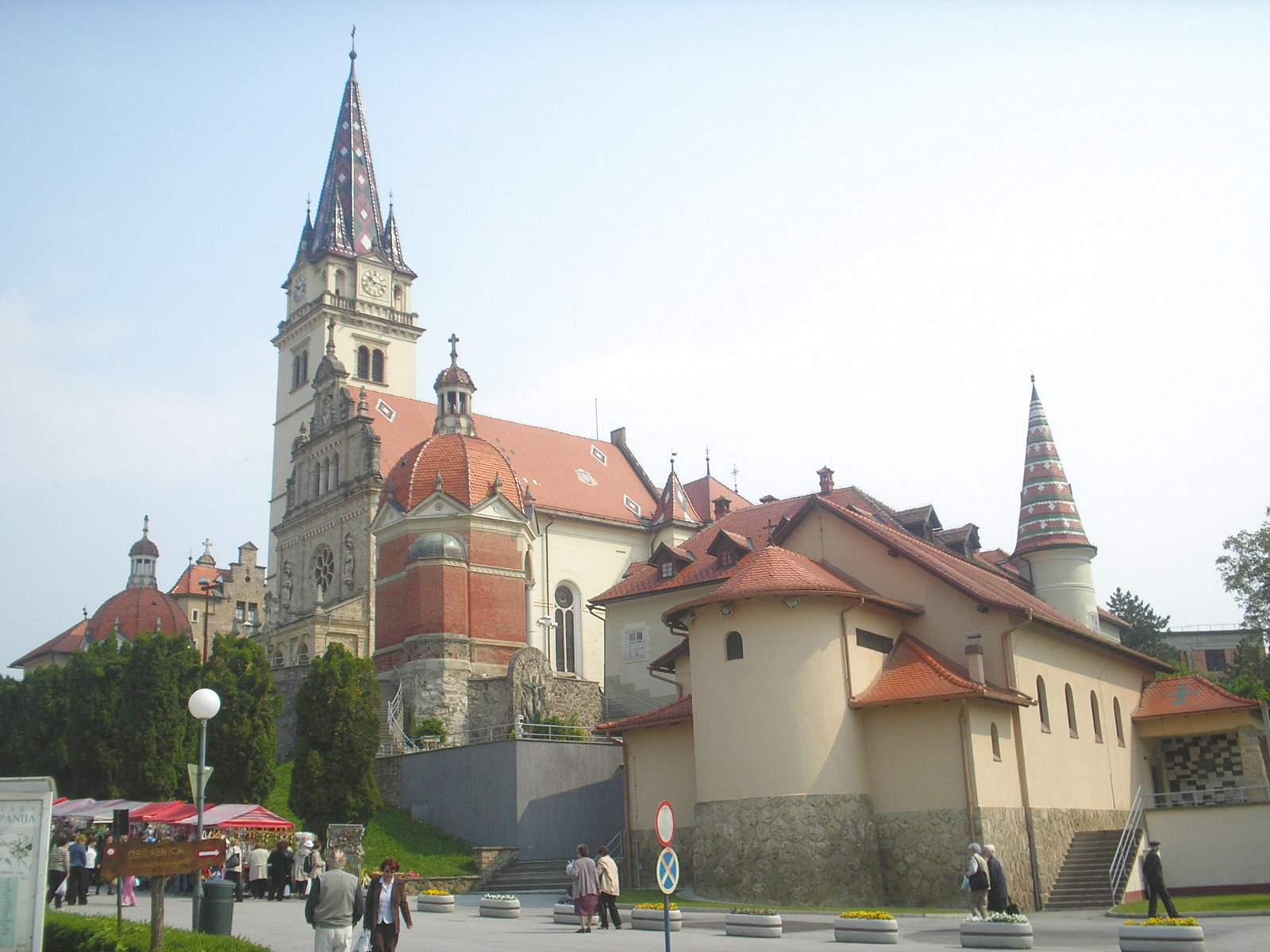
Outside view of the basilica

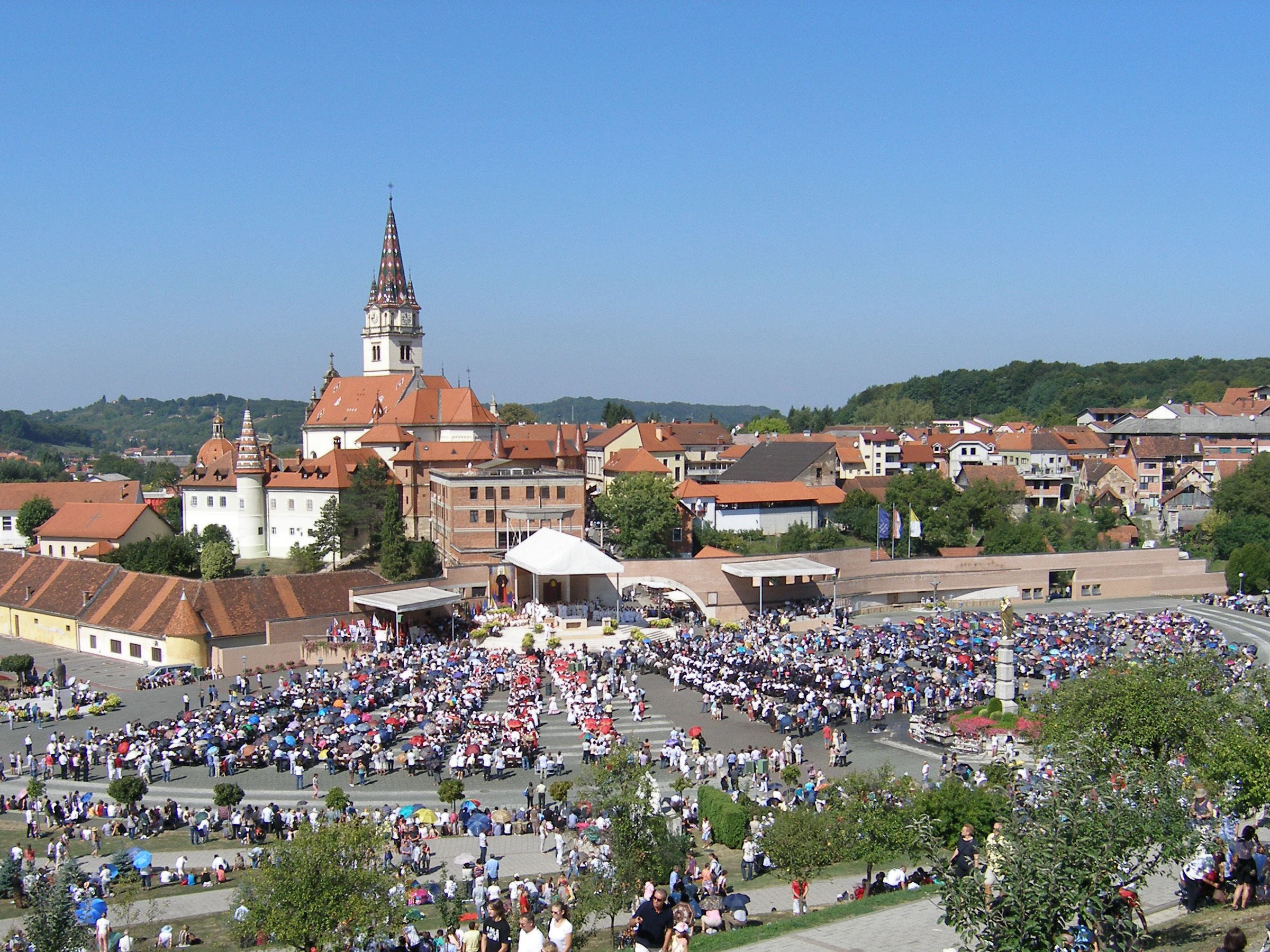
Open air church near the basilica

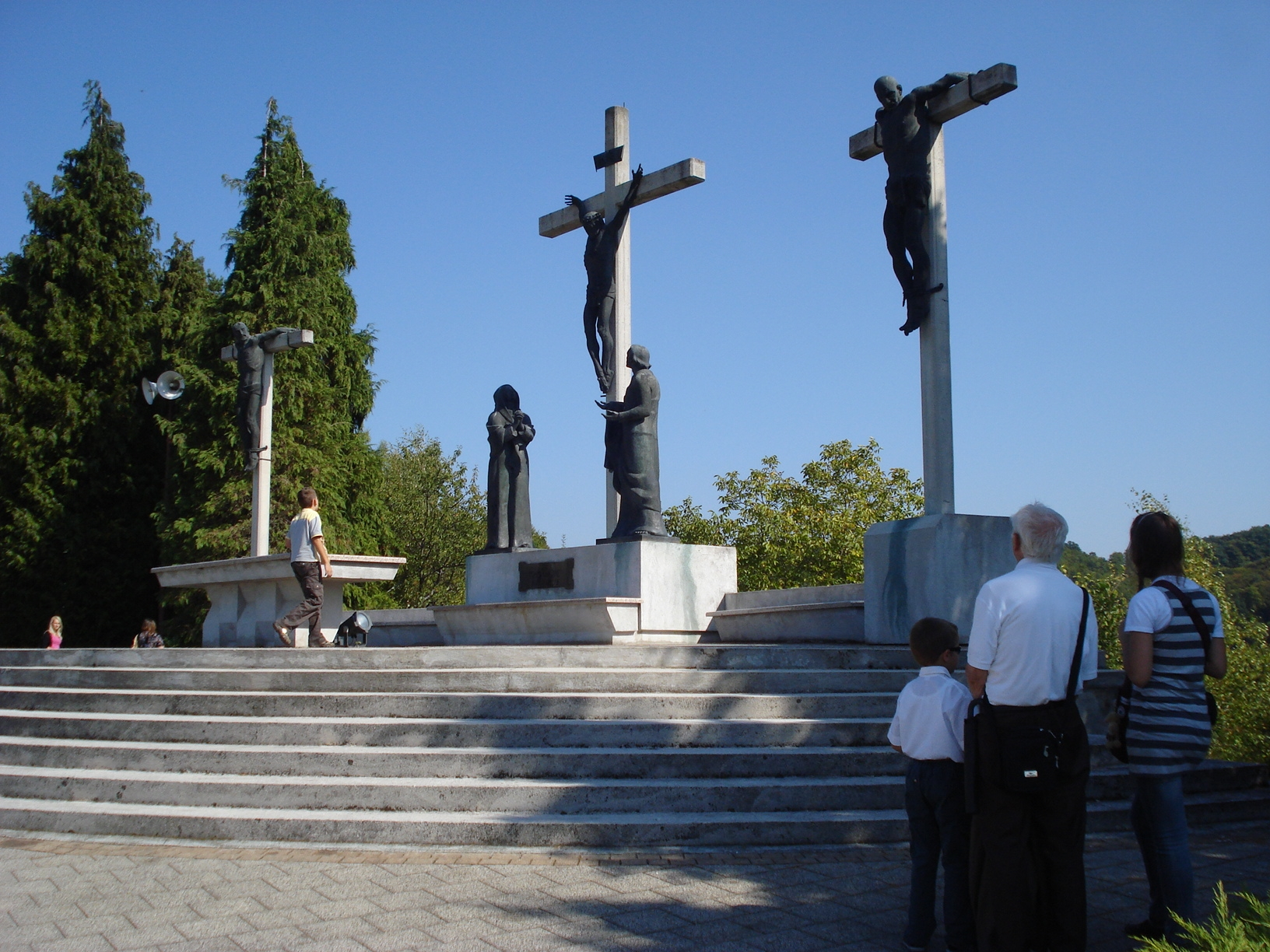
12th Station of The Way of the Cross at Marija Bistrica open air church

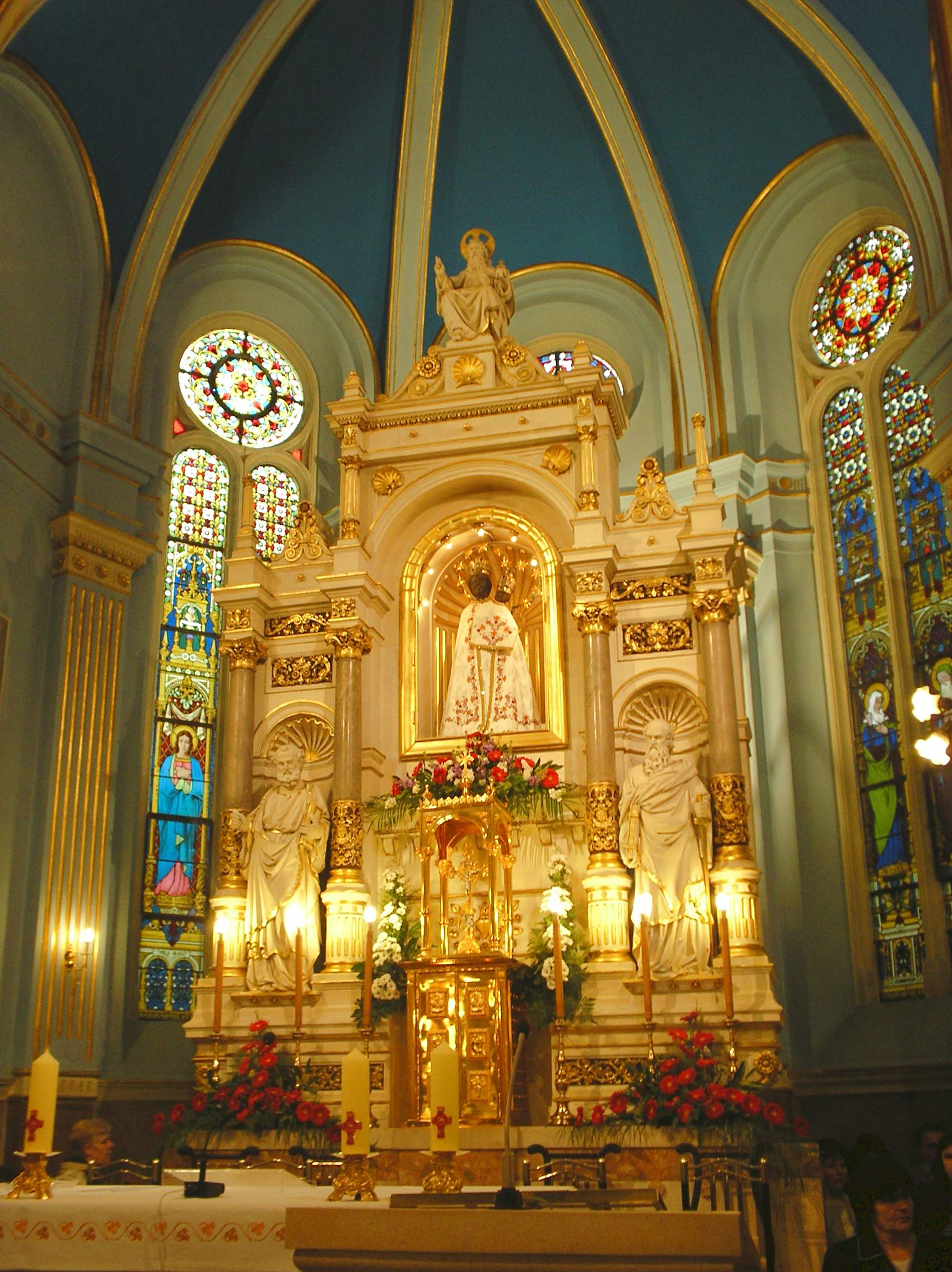
Altar of the Marija Bistrica basilica
