= Repno =

Repno may refer to:

- Repno, Slovenia, a village near Šentjur, Slovenia
- Repno, Croatia, a village near Zlatar, Croatia
