= Završje =

Završje, which translates as The End from Serbo-Croatian, may refer to:

In Slovenia:

- Završje, Trbovlje

In Croatia:

- Završje, Brod-Posavina County, a village near Sibinj
- Završje, Istria County, a village near Grožnjan
- Završje, Požega-Slavonia County, a village near Brestovac
- Završje, Primorje-Gorski Kotar County, a village near Skrad
- Završje Belečko, a village near Zlatar, Krapina–Zagorje County
- Završje Loborsko, a village near Lobor, Krapina–Zagorje County
- Završje Netretićko, a village near Netretić, Karlovac County
- Završje Podbelsko, a village near Novi Marof, Varaždin County
- Završje Začretsko, a village near Sveti Križ Začretje, Krapina–Zagorje County

In Bosnia and Herzegovina:

- Završje (Kiseljak)
- Završje (Goražde)
- Završje (region)
