= Selnica =

Selnica may refer to:

In Croatia:

- Selnica, Krapina-Zagorje County, a village near Marija Bistrica
- Selnica, Međimurje County, a village and municipality near Mursko Središće
- Selnica Podravska, a village in Koprivnica-Križevci County
- Selnica Šćitarjevska, a village in Zagreb County
- Donja Selnica, a village near Zlatar

In Slovenia:

- Selnica ob Dravi, a village west of Maribor
- Selnica ob Muri, a village east of Šentilj
