= Prepuštovec =

Prepuštovec may refer to:

- Prepuštovec, Zagreb, a village north of Sesvete, Croatia
- Prepuštovec, Krapina-Zagorje County, a village south of Budinščina, Croatia
