= Gornja Selnica =

- Village
- Location within Croatia
- Coordinates: 46°8′53″N 16°8′10″E
- Country: Croatia
- County: Krapina-Zagorje County
- Municipality: Zlatar

Area
  - Total: 8.9 km^{2} (3.4 sq mi)

Population (2021)
  - Total: 164
  - Density: 18/km^{2} (48/sq mi)
- Time zone: UTC+1 (CET)
  - Summer (DST): UTC+2 (CEST)

Gornja Selnica is a village in Croatia.
