= Petrova Gora, Krapina-Zagorje County =

Village near Lobor, Croatia

Coordinates: 46°09′42″N 16°01′36″E

Petrova Gora
- Interactive map of Petrova Gora

Petrova Gora is a village near Lobor, Croatia. In the 2021 census, it had 405 inhabitants.
