= Brezje Dravsko =

- Village
- Location within Croatia
- Coordinates: 46.375273°N 16.094872°E
- Country: Croatia
- County: Varaždin County
- Municipality: Cestica

Area
  - Total: 1.3 km^{2} (0.50 sq mi)

Population (2021)
  - Total: 203
  - Density: 160/km^{2} (400/sq mi)
- Time zone: UTC+1 (CET)
  - Summer (DST): UTC+2 (CEST)

Brezje Dravsko is a village in northern Croatia. It is connected by the D2 highway.
