= Radovec =

- Village
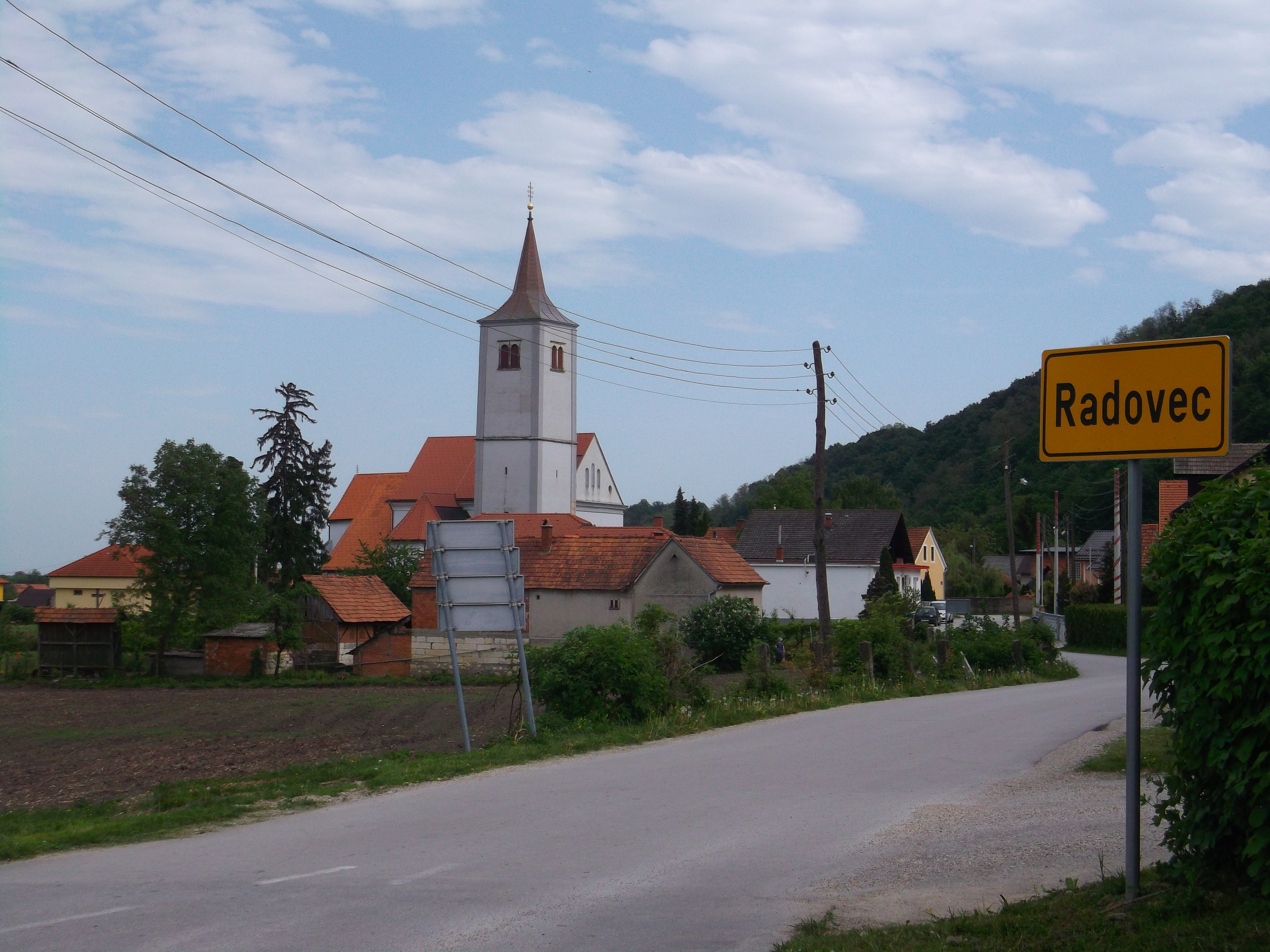
- Entry into the village
- Interactive map of Radovec
- Location within Croatia
- Coordinates: 46°21′44.2794″N 16°7′45.48″E
- Country: Croatia
- County: Varaždin County
- Municipality: Cestica

Area
  - Total: 1.4 km^{2} (0.54 sq mi)

Population (2021)
  - Total: 350
  - Density: 250/km^{2} (650/sq mi)
- Time zone: UTC+1 (CET)
  - Summer (DST): UTC+2 (CEST)
- Postal code: 42208 Cestica

Radovec is a village in the municipality of Cestica, Croatia.

== Demographics ==
In the 2021 census, the settlement had a population of 350.

Radovec: Population trends 1857–2021
v

population	238	319	331	361	376	441	445	456	477	346	325	288	303	284	315	336	350
	1857	1869	1880	1890	1900	1910	1921	1931	1948	1953	1961	1971	1981	1991	2001	2011	2021

Sources: Croatian Bureau of Statistics publications

== Religion ==
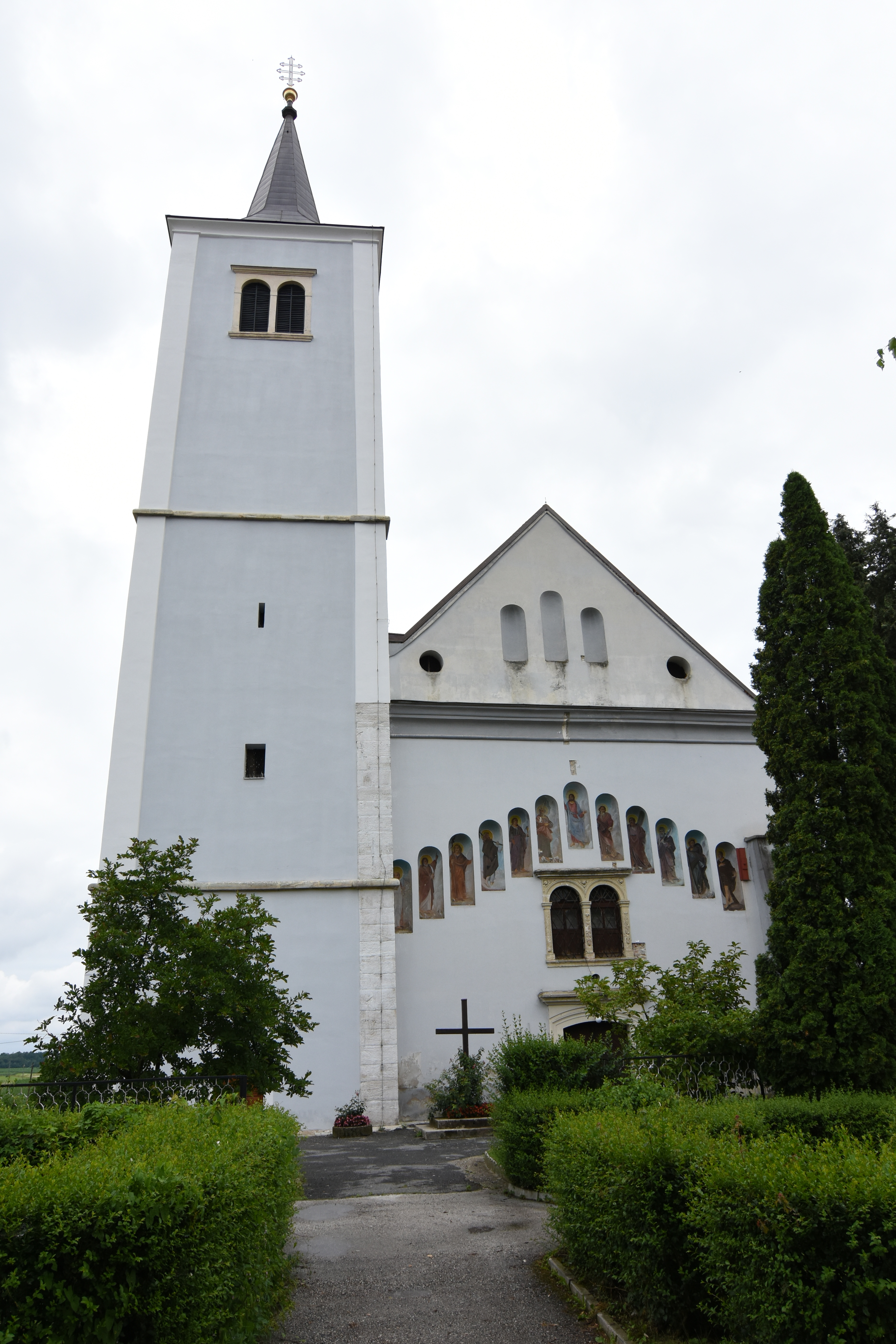
The Church of the Exaltation of the Holy Cross in 2018

The Church of the Exaltation of the Holy Cross is located in the center of Radovec and is the parish church of the Križovljan parish. The original chapel on the site, built in the 17th century, was dedicated to the Virgin Mary and built in the late Gothic style. The new church was built in 1753, when the nave was expanded and the existing material from the old church was used to build a new sanctuary and tower in the Baroque style.
