= Martinšćina =

Settlement in Krapina-Zagorje County, Croatia

- Settlement
- Interactive map of Martinšćina
- Location of Martinšćina in Croatia
- Coordinates: 46°08′20″N 16°05′17″E
- Country: Croatia
- County: Krapina-Zagorje
- City: Zlatar

Area
  - Total: 8.9 km^{2} (3.4 sq mi)

Population (2021)
  - Total: 340
  - Density: 38/km^{2} (99/sq mi)
- Time zone: UTC+1 (CET)
  - Summer (DST): UTC+2 (CEST)
- Postal code: 49250 Zlatar
- Area code: +385 (0)49

Martinšćina is a settlement in the City of Zlatar in Croatia. In 2021, its population was 340.

== Demographics ==
Martinšćina: Population trends 1857–2021
v

population	458	544	599	702	804	996	878	966	918	923	858	708	616	530	471	375	340
	1857	1869	1880	1890	1900	1910	1921	1931	1948	1953	1961	1971	1981	1991	2001	2011	2021

Sources: Croatian Bureau of Statistics publications
