= Petruševec, Krapina-Zagorje County =

Settlement in Krapina-Zagorje County, Croatia

Petruševec
- Settlement
- Interactive map of Petruševec
- Location of Petruševec in Croatia
- Coordinates: 46°07′16″N 16°08′28″E
- Country: Croatia
- County: Krapina-Zagorje
- City: Zlatar

Area
  - Total: 4.4 km^{2} (1.7 sq mi)

Population (2021)
  - Total: 114
  - Density: 26/km^{2} (67/sq mi)
- Time zone: UTC+1 (CET)
  - Summer (DST): UTC+2 (CEST)
- Postal code: 49250 Zlatar
- Area code: +385 (0)49

Petruševec is a settlement in the City of Zlatar in Croatia. In 2021, its population was 114.

== Demographics ==
Petruševec: Population trends 1857–2021
v

population	178	168	215	244	261	324	330	344	369	371	355	291	233	184	153	135	114
	1857	1869	1880	1890	1900	1910	1921	1931	1948	1953	1961	1971	1981	1991	2001	2011	2021

Sources: Croatian Bureau of Statistics publications
