= Juranšćina =

Settlement in Krapina-Zagorje County, Croatia

- Settlement
- Interactive map of Juranšćina
- Location of Juranšćina in Croatia
- Coordinates: 46°08′46″N 16°07′23″E
- Country: Croatia
- County: Krapina-Zagorje
- City: Zlatar

Area
  - Total: 7.4 km^{2} (2.9 sq mi)

Population (2021)
  - Total: 162
  - Density: 22/km^{2} (57/sq mi)
- Time zone: UTC+1 (CET)
  - Summer (DST): UTC+2 (CEST)
- Postal code: 49250 Zlatar
- Area code: +385 (0)49

Juranšćina is a settlement in the City of Zlatar in Croatia. In 2021, its population was 162.

== Demographics ==
Juranšćina: Population trends 1857–2021
v

| population | 272 | 311 | 319 | 347 | 429 | 465 | 439 | 454 | 500 | 435 | 383 | 349 | 289 | 246 | 192 | 193 | 162 |
| | 1857 | 1869 | 1880 | 1890 | 1900 | 1910 | 1921 | 1931 | 1948 | 1953 | 1961 | 1971 | 1981 | 1991 | 2001 | 2011 | 2021 |

Sources: Croatian Bureau of Statistics publications
