= Šćrbinec =

Settlement in Krapina-Zagorje County, Croatia

- Settlement
- Interactive map of Šćrbinec
- Location of Šćrbinec in Croatia
- Coordinates: 46°07′05″N 16°07′12″E
- Country: Croatia
- County: Krapina-Zagorje
- City: Zlatar

Area
  - Total: 1.4 km^{2} (0.54 sq mi)

Population (2021)
  - Total: 9
  - Density: 6.4/km^{2} (17/sq mi)
- Time zone: UTC+1 (CET)
  - Summer (DST): UTC+2 (CEST)
- Postal code: 49250 Zlatar
- Area code: +385 (0)49

Šćrbinec is a settlement in the City of Zlatar in Croatia. In 2021, its population was 9.

== Demographics ==
Šćrbinec: Population trends 1857–2021
v

population	38	49	42	38	38	36	27	39	25	24	26	26	19	22	18	11	9
	1857	1869	1880	1890	1900	1910	1921	1931	1948	1953	1961	1971	1981	1991	2001	2011	2021

Sources: Croatian Bureau of Statistics publications
