= Cetinovec =

Coordinates: 46°06′N 16°03′E

- Village
- Interactive map of Cetinovec
- Country: Croatia
- County: Krapina-Zagorje County
- Town: Zlatar

Area
  - Total: 0.6 km^{2} (0.23 sq mi)

Population (2021)
  - Total: 115
  - Density: 190/km^{2} (500/sq mi)
- Time zone: UTC+1 (CET)
  - Summer (DST): UTC+2 (CEST)

Cetinovec is a village in Croatia. It is connected by the D29 highway.
