= Ratkovec =

Settlement in Krapina-Zagorje County, Croatia

- Settlement
- Interactive map of Ratkovec
- Location of Ratkovec in Croatia
- Coordinates: 46°06′58″N 16°04′59″E
- Country: Croatia
- County: Krapina-Zagorje
- City: Zlatar

Area
  - Total: 2.2 km^{2} (0.85 sq mi)

Population (2021)
  - Total: 98
  - Density: 45/km^{2} (120/sq mi)
- Time zone: UTC+1 (CET)
  - Summer (DST): UTC+2 (CEST)
- Postal code: 49250 Zlatar
- Area code: +385 (0)49

Ratkovec is a settlement in the City of Zlatar in Croatia. In 2021, its population was 98.

== Demographics ==
Ratkovec: Population trends 1857–2021
v

population	145	155	161	179	218	163	253	247	247	224	229	209	192	161	130	105	98
	1857	1869	1880	1890	1900	1910	1921	1931	1948	1953	1961	1971	1981	1991	2001	2011	2021

Sources: Croatian Bureau of Statistics publications
