= Babinec, Croatia =

Babinec
- Village
- Location within Croatia
- Coordinates: 46°22′19″N 16°06′36″E
- Country: Croatia
- County: Varaždin County
- Municipality: Cestica

Area
  - Total: 2.0 km^{2} (0.77 sq mi)

Population (2021)
  - Total: 514
  - Density: 260/km^{2} (670/sq mi)
- Time zone: UTC+1 (CET)
  - Summer (DST): UTC+2 (CEST)

Babinec is a village in Croatia. It is connected by the D2 highway.
