= Lipovec, Krapina-Zagorje County =

Coordinates: 46°03′27″N 16°06′12″E

Lipovec
- Village
- Interactive map of Lipovec
- Country: Croatia
- County: Krapina-Zagorje County
- Municipality: Zlatar Bistrica

Area
  - Total: 4.1 km^{2} (1.6 sq mi)

Population (2021)
  - Total: 160
  - Density: 39/km^{2} (100/sq mi)
- Time zone: UTC+1 (CET)
  - Summer (DST): UTC+2 (CEST)

Lipovec is a village in Croatia. It is connected by the D24 highway.
