= Ervenik Zlatarski, Zlatar Bistrica =

Ervenik Zlatarski
- Village
- Location within Croatia
- Coordinates: 46°4′59″N 16°6′58″E
- Country: Croatia
- County: Krapina-Zagorje County
- Municipality: Zlatar Bistrica

Area
  - Total: 5.3 km^{2} (2.0 sq mi)

Population (2021)
  - Total: 64
  - Density: 12/km^{2} (31/sq mi)
- Time zone: UTC+1 (CET)
  - Summer (DST): UTC+2 (CEST)

Ervenik Zlatarski is a village in Croatia.
