= Borkovec =

Settlement in Krapina-Zagorje County, Croatia

- Settlement
- Interactive map of Borkovec
- Location of Borkovec in Croatia
- Coordinates: 46°06′07″N 16°05′10″E
- Country: Croatia
- County: Krapina-Zagorje
- City: Zlatar

Area
  - Total: 2.0 km^{2} (0.77 sq mi)

Population (2021)
  - Total: 205
  - Density: 100/km^{2} (270/sq mi)
- Time zone: UTC+1 (CET)
  - Summer (DST): UTC+2 (CEST)
- Postal code: 49250 Zlatar
- Area code: +385 (0)49

Borkovec is a settlement in the City of Zlatar in Croatia. In 2021, its population was 205.

== Demographics ==
Borkovec: Population trends 1857–2021
v

population	206	265	265	279	317	378	374	397	461	399	377	378	279	260	246	225	205
	1857	1869	1880	1890	1900	1910	1921	1931	1948	1953	1961	1971	1981	1991	2001	2011	2021

Sources: Croatian Bureau of Statistics publications
