= Otok Virje =

Coordinates: 46°24′00″N 16°09′11″E

- Village
- Interactive map of Otok Virje
- Country: Croatia

Area
  - Total: 3.4 km^{2} (1.3 sq mi)

Population (2021)
  - Total: 226
  - Density: 66/km^{2} (170/sq mi)
- Time zone: UTC+1 (CET)
  - Summer (DST): UTC+2 (CEST)

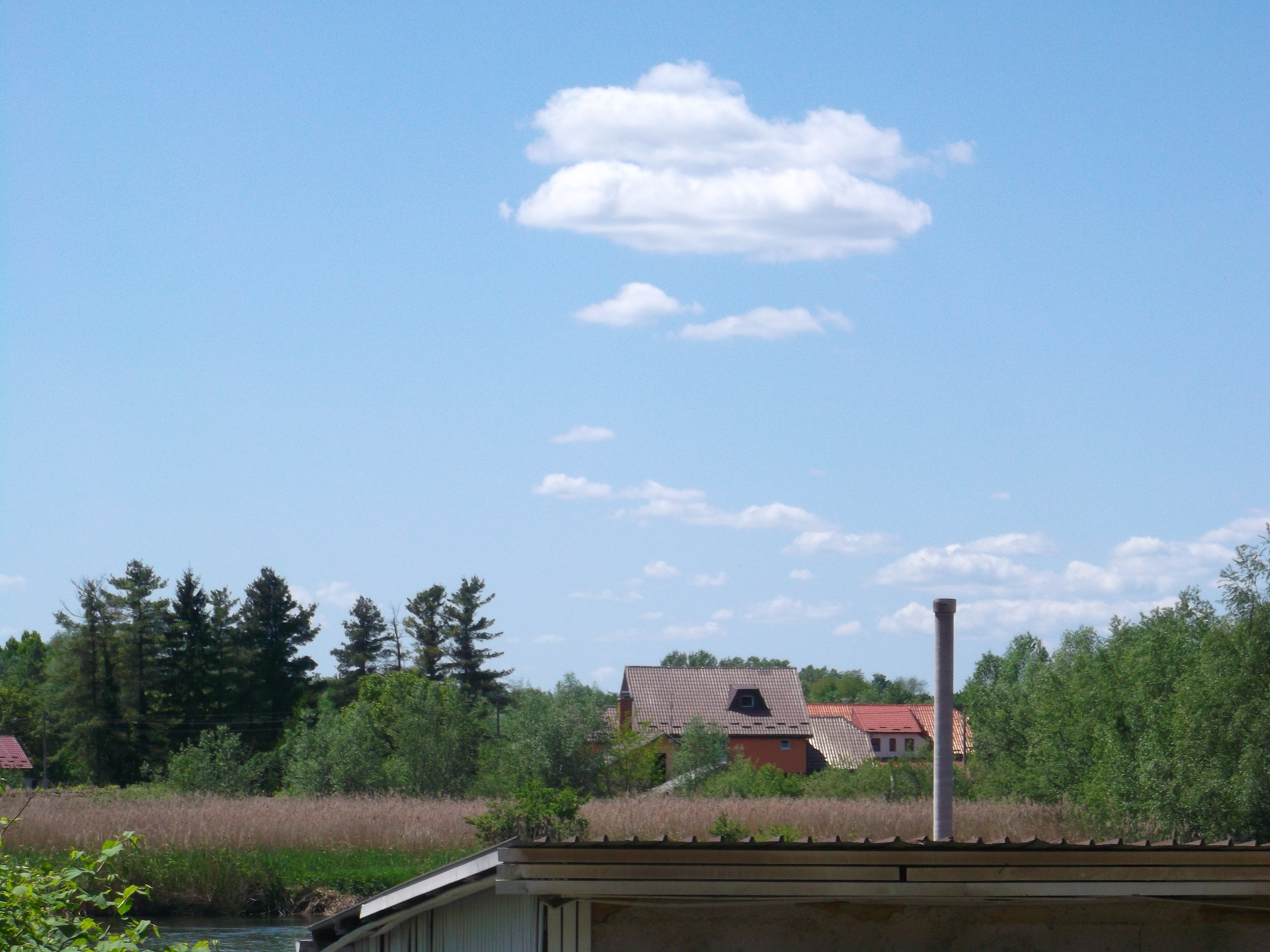

Otok Virje is a village in Croatia, located in the municipality of Cestica near Virje Križovljansko. It is connected by the D2 highway.
