= Vižanovec =

Settlement in Krapina-Zagorje County, Croatia

- Settlement
- Interactive map of Vižanovec
- Location of Vižanovec in Croatia
- Coordinates: 46°06′29″N 16°08′49″E
- Country: Croatia
- County: Krapina-Zagorje
- City: Zlatar

Area
  - Total: 2.9 km^{2} (1.1 sq mi)

Population (2021)
  - Total: 111
  - Density: 38/km^{2} (99/sq mi)
- Time zone: UTC+1 (CET)
  - Summer (DST): UTC+2 (CEST)
- Postal code: 49250 Zlatar
- Area code: +385 (0)49

Vižanovec is a settlement in the City of Zlatar in Croatia. In 2021, its population was 111.

== Demographics ==
Vižanovec: Population trends 1857–2021
v

population	146	152	161	183	211	280	300	336	395	363	358	290	253	205	177	156	111
	1857	1869	1880	1890	1900	1910	1921	1931	1948	1953	1961	1971	1981	1991	2001	2011	2021

Sources: Croatian Bureau of Statistics publications
