= Gajec, Croatia =

Gajec
- Village
- Location within Croatia
- Country: Croatia
- County: City of Zagreb
- City District: Sesvete

Area
  - Total: 0.93 sq mi (2.4 km^{2})

Population (2021)
  - Total: 327
  - Density: 350/sq mi (140/km^{2})
- Time zone: UTC+1 (CET)
  - Summer (DST): UTC+2 (CEST)

Gajec is a village in Croatia, located about 20km north east of Zagreb. It is connected by the D29 highway.

== Demographics ==
According to the 2021 census, its population was 327. According to the 2011 census, it had 311 inhabitants.
