= Veleškovec =

Coordinates: 46°03′00″N 16°06′32″E

- Village
- Interactive map of Veleškovec
- Country: Croatia
- County: Krapina-Zagorje County
- Municipality: Zlatar Bistrica

Area
  - Total: 3.1 km^{2} (1.2 sq mi)

Population (2021)
  - Total: 247
  - Density: 80/km^{2} (210/sq mi)
- Time zone: UTC+1 (CET)
  - Summer (DST): UTC+2 (CEST)

Veleškovec is a village in Croatia. It is connected by the D24 highway.
