= Peršaves =

Coordinates: 46°07′N 16°02′E

- Village
- Interactive map of Peršaves
- Country: Croatia
- County: Krapina-Zagorje County

Area
  - Total: 2.7 km^{2} (1.0 sq mi)

Population (2021)
  - Total: 289
  - Density: 110/km^{2} (280/sq mi)
- Time zone: UTC+1 (CET)
  - Summer (DST): UTC+2 (CEST)

Peršaves is a village in Croatia. It is connected by the D29 highway.
