= Znož =

Settlement in Krapina-Zagorje County, Croatia

- Settlement
- Interactive map of Znož
- Location of Znož in Croatia
- Coordinates: 46°06′43″N 16°06′07″E
- Country: Croatia
- County: Krapina-Zagorje
- City: Zlatar

Area
  - Total: 0.7 km^{2} (0.27 sq mi)

Population (2021)
  - Total: 18
  - Density: 26/km^{2} (67/sq mi)
- Time zone: UTC+1 (CET)
  - Summer (DST): UTC+2 (CEST)
- Postal code: 49250 Zlatar
- Area code: +385 (0)49

Znož is a settlement in the City of Zlatar in Croatia. In 2021, its population was 18.

== Demographics ==
Znož: Population trends 1857–2021
v

population	32	38	49	47	40	41	72	59	35	73	77	68	59	46	34	24	18
	1857	1869	1880	1890	1900	1910	1921	1931	1948	1953	1961	1971	1981	1991	2001	2011	2021

Sources: Croatian Bureau of Statistics publications
