= Belec, Croatia =

Settlement in Krapina-Zagorje County, Croatia

Belec
- Settlement
- Interactive map of Belec
- Location of Belec in Croatia
- Coordinates: 46°08′10″N 16°07′30″E
- Country: Croatia
- County: Krapina-Zagorje
- City: Zlatar

Area
  - Total: 2.5 km^{2} (0.97 sq mi)

Population (2021)
  - Total: 316
  - Density: 130/km^{2} (330/sq mi)
- Time zone: UTC+1 (CET)
  - Summer (DST): UTC+2 (CEST)
- Postal code: 49250 Zlatar
- Area code: +385 (0)49

Belec is a settlement in the City of Zlatar in Croatia. In 2021, its population was 316.

== Demographics ==
Belec: Population trends 1857–2021
v

| population | 270 | 335 | 373 | 423 | 527 | 524 | 486 | 540 | 581 | 623 | 560 | 521 | 457 | 469 | 370 | 356 | 316 |
| | 1857 | 1869 | 1880 | 1890 | 1900 | 1910 | 1921 | 1931 | 1948 | 1953 | 1961 | 1971 | 1981 | 1991 | 2001 | 2011 | 2021 |

Sources: Croatian Bureau of Statistics publications
