= Tugonica =

- Village
- Location within Croatia
- Coordinates: 46°02′N 16°06′E
- Country: Croatia
- County: Krapina-Zagorje County
- Municipality: Marija Bistrica

Area
  - Total: 5.3 km^{2} (2.0 sq mi)

Population (2021)
  - Total: 517
  - Density: 98/km^{2} (250/sq mi)
- Time zone: UTC+1 (CET)
  - Summer (DST): UTC+2 (CEST)
- Postal code: 49246 Marija Bistrica

Tugonica is a village in Zagorje, Croatia. It is connected by the D29 highway.
