= Donja Batina, Zlatar =

Coordinates: 46°07′N 16°07′E

Donja Batina
- Village
- Interactive map of Donja Batina
- Country: Croatia
- County: Krapina-Zagorje County

Area
  - Total: 3.2 sq mi (8.3 km^{2})

Population (2021)
  - Total: 310
  - Density: 97/sq mi (37/km^{2})
- Time zone: UTC+1 (CET)
  - Summer (DST): UTC+2 (CEST)

Donja Batina is a village in Zlatar, Krapina-Zagorje County, Croatia.
