= Vurnovec =

- Village
- Location within Croatia
- Coordinates: 45°53′24″N 16°08′10″E
- Country: Croatia
- County: City of Zagreb
- City District: Sesvete

Area
  - Total: 0.35 sq mi (0.9 km^{2})

Population (2021)
  - Total: 192
  - Density: 550/sq mi (210/km^{2})
- Time zone: UTC+1 (CET)
  - Summer (DST): UTC+2 (CEST)

Vurnovec is a village in Croatia. It is connected by the D29 highway. It is formally a settlement (naselje) of Zagreb, the capital of Croatia.

== Demographics ==
According to the 2021 census, its population was 192.
