= Cestica =

- Municipality
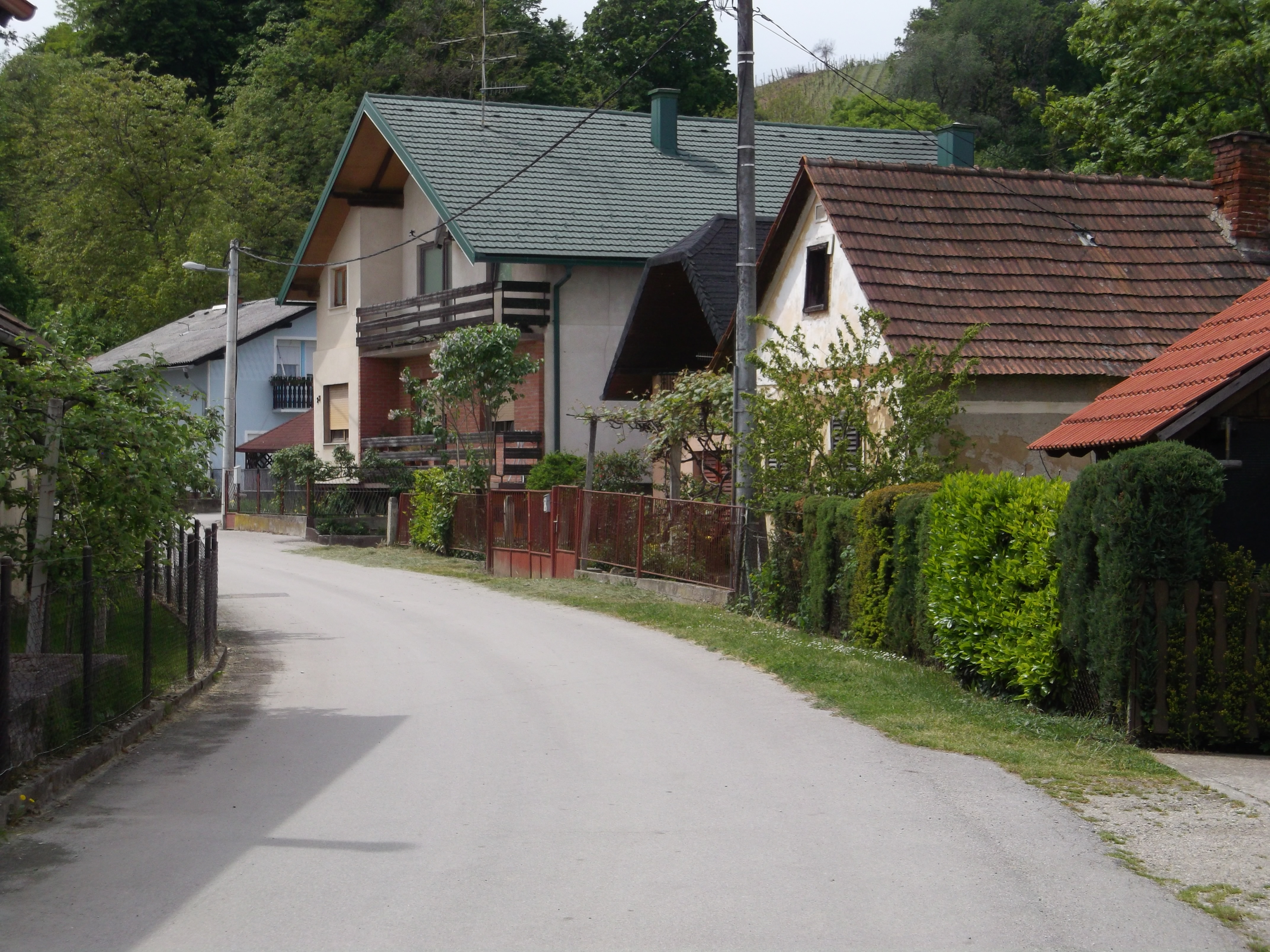
- A street in Cestica

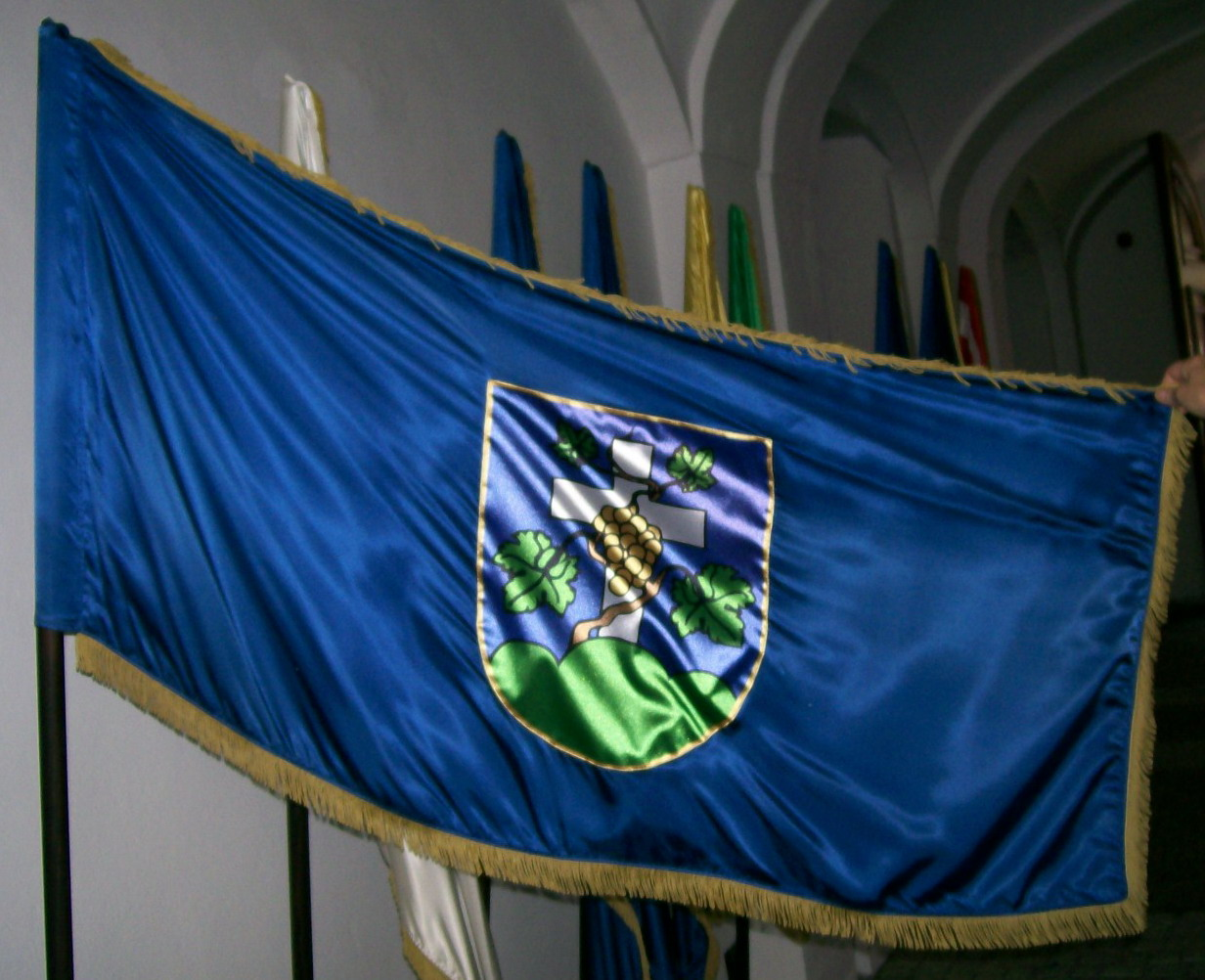
- Flag

- Location of Cestica in Croatia
- Coordinates: 46.37°N 16.13°E
- Country: Croatia
- County: Varaždin County

Government
  - Municipal mayor: Mirko Korotaj (HNS)

Area
  - Municipality: 46.1 km^{2} (17.8 sq mi)
  - Urban: 5.6 km^{2} (2.2 sq mi)

Population (2021)
  - Municipality: 5,425
  - Density: 118/km^{2} (305/sq mi)
  - Urban: 479
  - Urban density: 86/km^{2} (220/sq mi)
- Time zone: UTC+1 (CET)
  - Summer (DST): UTC+2 (CEST)
- Postal code: 42208 Cestica
- Website: cestica.hr

Cestica is a village and municipality in Croatia in Varaždin County.

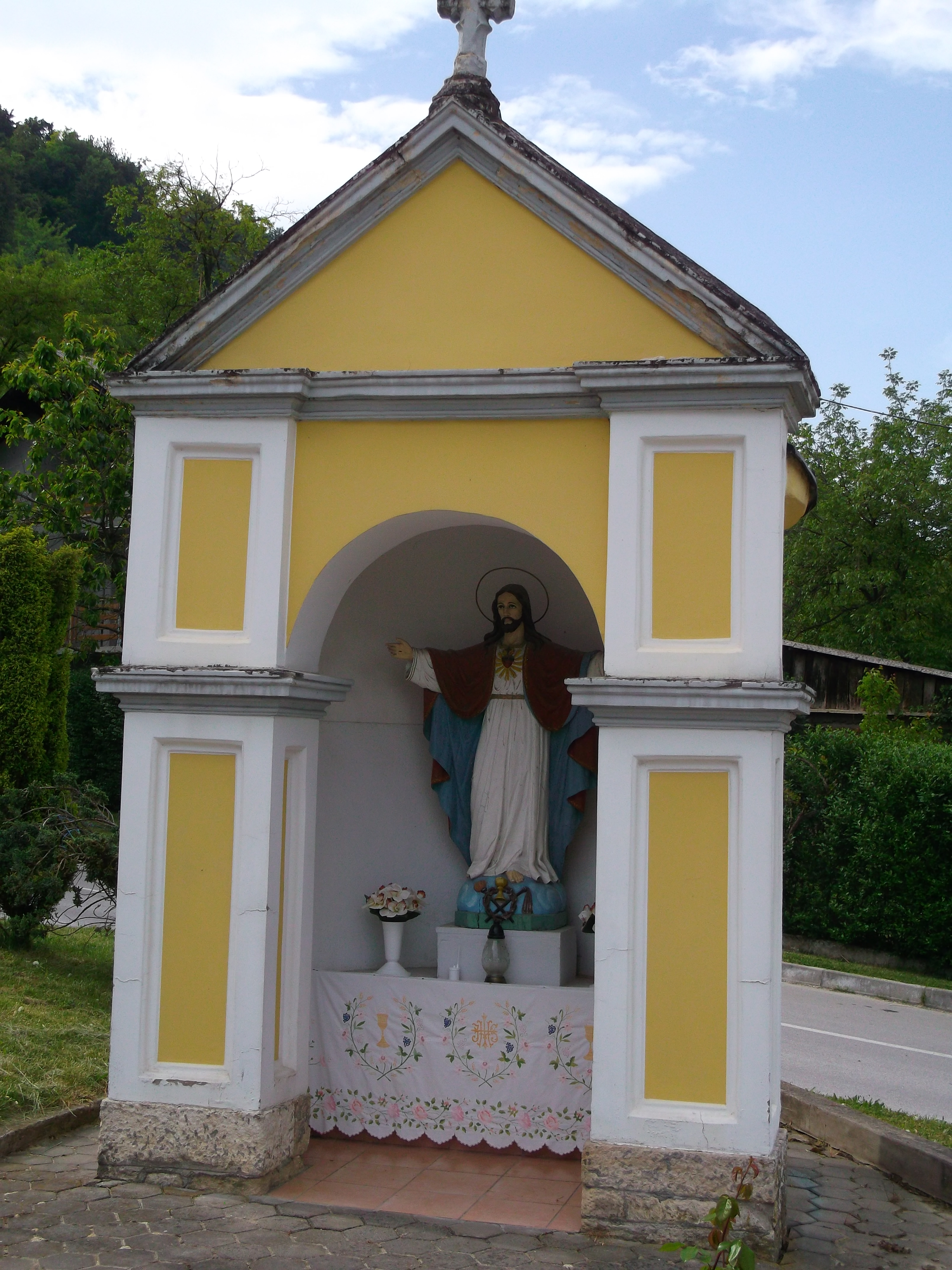
Chapel of Jesus between Radovec and Cestica

== Demographics ==
In the 2021 census, the municipality had a population of 5,425 in the following settlements:

- Babinec, population 514
- Brezje Dravsko, population 203
- Cestica, population 479
- Dubrava Križovljanska, population 216
- Falinić Breg, population 89
- Gornje Vratno, population 1,297
- Jarki, population 132
- Kolarovec, population 220
- Križanče, population 118
- Križovljan Radovečki, population 235
- Mali Lovrečan, population 39
- Malo Gradišće, population 112
- Natkrižovljan, population 258
- Otok Virje, population 226
- Radovec, population 350
- Radovec Polje, population 145
- Selci Križovljanski, population 145
- Veliki Lovrečan, population 312
- Virje Križovljansko, population 263
- Vratno Otok, population 72

The majority of inhabitants are Croats, making up 87.35% of the population.

Cestica: Population trends 1857–2021
v

population	2888	3234	3306	3668	3864	5154	5267	5873	6388	6312	6262	6240	5998	5790	5678	5806	5425
	1857	1869	1880	1890	1900	1910	1921	1931	1948	1953	1961	1971	1981	1991	2001	2011	2021

Sources: Croatian Bureau of Statistics publications

== Administration ==
The current municipal mayor of Cestica is Mirko Korotaj (HNS) and the Cestica Municipal Council consists of 13 seats.

Groups	Councilors per group
HNS	8 / 13
SDP	4 / 13
HDZ	1 / 13

== Culture ==
There are currently 26 associations operating in the Municipality of Cestica:

- VFD Babinec
- VFD Gornje Vratno
- VFD Gradišće
- VFD Križovljan Cestica
- VFD Lovrečan-Dubrava
- VFD Virje Križovljansko
- Firefighting Association of the Municipality of Cestica
- Football club "Bratstvo"
- Football club "Dinamo" Babinec
- Football club "Polet" Cestica
- Football club "Vratno"
- Minifootball club Kolarovec
- Minifootball club Lovrečan
- Sports recreation association "Vrtovi Vratno"
- Cultural and Artistic Society of the Municipality of Cestica
- Sport Fishing Club "Municipality of Cestica 1995"
- Hunting Society "Cestica" Cestica
- Hunting Society "Saint Hubert" Cestica
- Association of Winegrowers and Winemakers "St. Martin"
- Cestica Municipality Pensioners' Association
- "Vezilje" Handicraft Association
- Association of Traditional Customs "Pingo"
- "Life and Joy", an association for children with disabilities and people with disabilities
- Sports and recreation club "Poleti"
- Youth Association hyperACTIVE Cestica
- For life association

== Religion ==
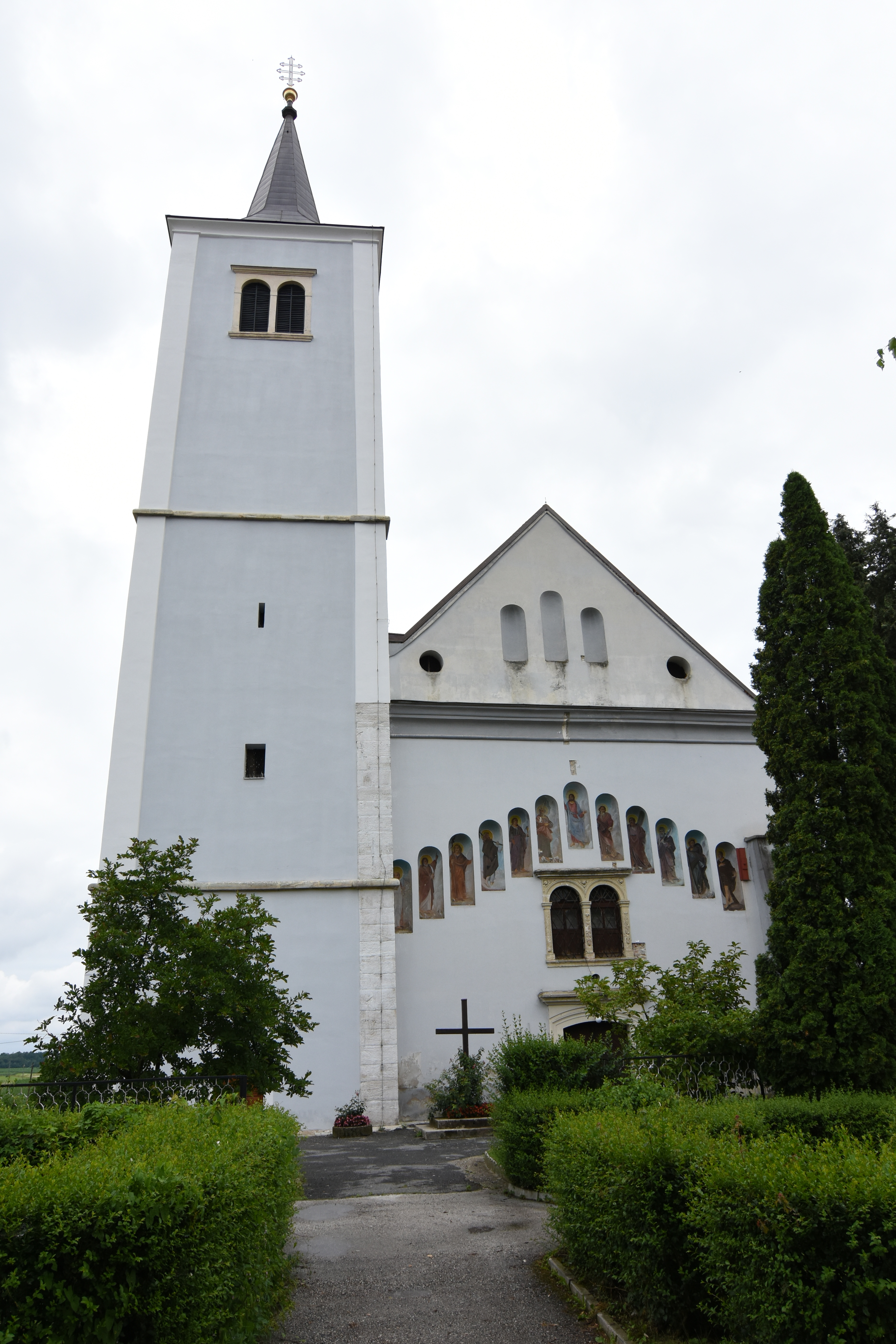
The Church of the Exaltation of the Holy Cross in 2018

The Church of the Exaltation of the Holy Cross is located in the center of Radovec and is the parish church of the Križovljan parish. The original chapel on the site, built in the 17th century, was dedicated to the Virgin Mary and built in the late Gothic style. The new church was built in 1753, when the nave was expanded and the existing material from the old church was used to build a new sanctuary and tower in the Baroque style.

The day of the municipality is September 14th, which is the Feast of the Holy Cross.
