= Veliki Lovrečan =

Coordinates: 46°23′N 16°05′E

- Village
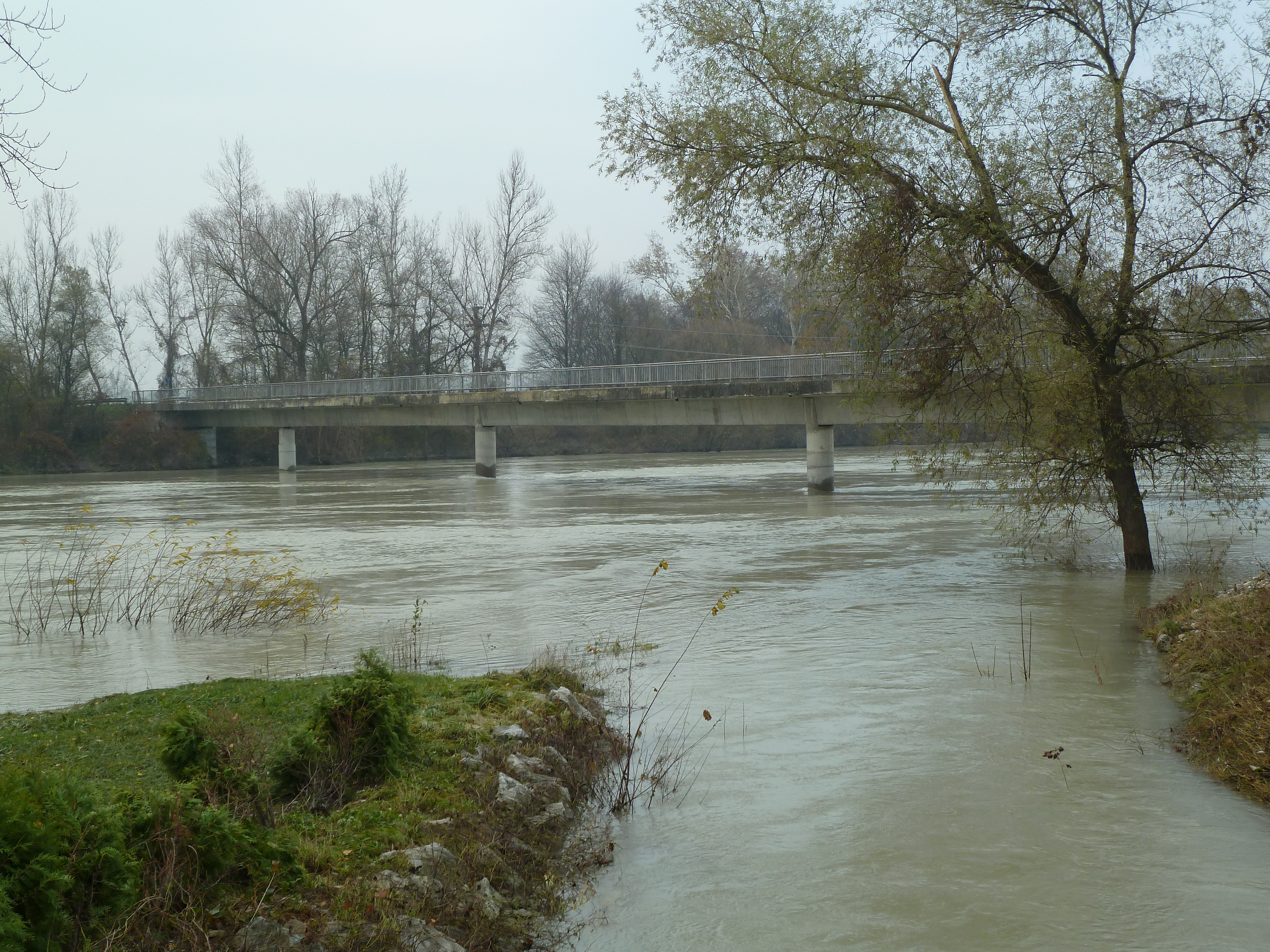
- Drava River at the village of Veliki Lovrecan, Croatia
- Interactive map of Veliki Lovrečan
- Country: Croatia
- County: Varaždin County
- Municipality: Cestica

Area
  - Total: 3.4 km^{2} (1.3 sq mi)

Population (2021)
  - Total: 312
  - Density: 92/km^{2} (240/sq mi)
- Time zone: UTC+1 (CET)
  - Summer (DST): UTC+2 (CEST)

Veliki Lovrečan is a village in Croatia. It is connected by the D2 highway.
