= Donja Selnica =

Settlement in Krapina-Zagorje County, Croatia

- Settlement
- Interactive map of Donja Selnica
- Location of Donja Selnica in Croatia
- Coordinates: 46°07′55″N 16°09′25″E
- Country: Croatia
- County: Krapina-Zagorje
- City: Zlatar

Area
  - Total: 3.6 km^{2} (1.4 sq mi)

Population (2021)
  - Total: 151
  - Density: 42/km^{2} (110/sq mi)
- Time zone: UTC+1 (CET)
  - Summer (DST): UTC+2 (CEST)
- Postal code: 49250 Zlatar
- Area code: +385 (0)49

Donja Selnica is a settlement in the City of Zlatar in Croatia. In 2021, its population was 151.

== Demographics ==
Donja Selnica: Population trends 1857–2021
v

population	443	460	588	702	765	553	504	526	560	543	478	400	333	300	241	196	151
	1857	1869	1880	1890	1900	1910	1921	1931	1948	1953	1961	1971	1981	1991	2001	2011	2021

Sources: Croatian Bureau of Statistics publications
