= Velika Petrovagorska =

Coordinates: 46°08′56″N 16°00′50″E

- Village
- Interactive map of Velika Petrovagorska
- Country: Croatia
- County: Krapina-Zagorje County

Area
  - Total: 1.0 km^{2} (0.39 sq mi)

Population (2021)
  - Total: 224
  - Density: 220/km^{2} (580/sq mi)
- Time zone: UTC+1 (CET)
  - Summer (DST): UTC+2 (CEST)

Velika Petrovagorska is a village in Croatia. It is connected by the D29 highway.
