= Lovrečan, Krapina-Zagorje County =

Coordinates: 46°03′13″N 16°05′23″E

Lovrečan
- Village
- Interactive map of Lovrečan
- Country: Croatia
- County: Krapina-Zagorje County
- Municipality: Zlatar Bistrica

Area
  - Total: 4.9 km^{2} (1.9 sq mi)

Population (2021)
  - Total: 362
  - Density: 74/km^{2} (190/sq mi)
- Time zone: UTC+1 (CET)
  - Summer (DST): UTC+2 (CEST)

Lovrečan is a village in Croatia. It is connected by the D24 highway.
