= Repno, Croatia =

Coordinates: 46°07′N 16°06′E

Repno
- Village
- Interactive map of Repno
- Country: Croatia
- County: Krapina-Zagorje County
- Municipality: Zlatar

Area
  - Total: 3.6 km^{2} (1.4 sq mi)

Population (2021)
  - Total: 190
  - Density: 53/km^{2} (140/sq mi)
- Time zone: UTC+1 (CET)
  - Summer (DST): UTC+2 (CEST)

Repno is a village in Croatia.
