= Laz Bistrički =

Coordinates: 45°58′N 16°06′E

- Village
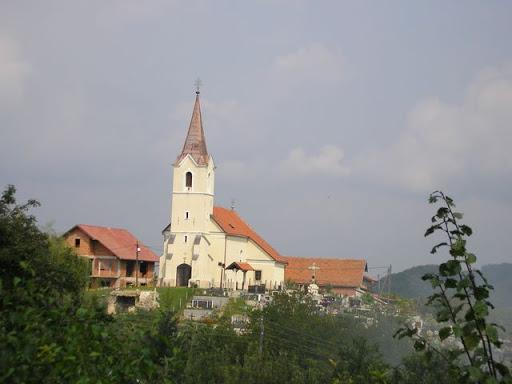
- St. Andrije Church in Laz Bistrički
- Interactive map of Laz Bistrički
- Country: Croatia
- County: Krapina-Zagorje County
- Municipality: Marija Bistrica

Area
  - Total: 7.5 km^{2} (2.9 sq mi)
- Elevation: 254 m (833 ft)

Population (2021)
  - Total: 742
  - Density: 99/km^{2} (260/sq mi)
- Time zone: UTC+1 (CET)
  - Summer (DST): UTC+2 (CEST)
- ZIP Code: 49246
- Area code: (+385) 49

Laz Bistrički ("Laz of Bistrica") is a village in Croatia. It is connected by the D29 highway. South down the highway lies its sister village of Laz Stubički. Further south is the northwestern capital of Croatia- Zagreb.
