= Ladislavec =

Coordinates: 46°07′N 16°04′E

- Village
- Interactive map of Ladislavec
- Country: Croatia
- County: Krapina-Zagorje County
- Municipality: Zlatar

Area
  - Total: 1.5 km^{2} (0.58 sq mi)

Population (2021)
  - Total: 160
  - Density: 110/km^{2} (280/sq mi)
- Time zone: UTC+1 (CET)
  - Summer (DST): UTC+2 (CEST)

Ladislavec is a village in Croatia.
