= Laz Stubički =

- Village
- Interactive map of Laz Stubički
- Coordinates: 45°58′N 16°06′E
- Country: Croatia
- County: Krapina-Zagorje County

Area
  - Total: 2.1 km^{2} (0.81 sq mi)
- Elevation: 400 m (1,300 ft)

Population (2021)
  - Total: 220
  - Density: 100/km^{2} (270/sq mi)
- Time zone: UTC+1 (CET)
  - Summer (DST): UTC+2 (CEST)
- ZIP Code: 49246

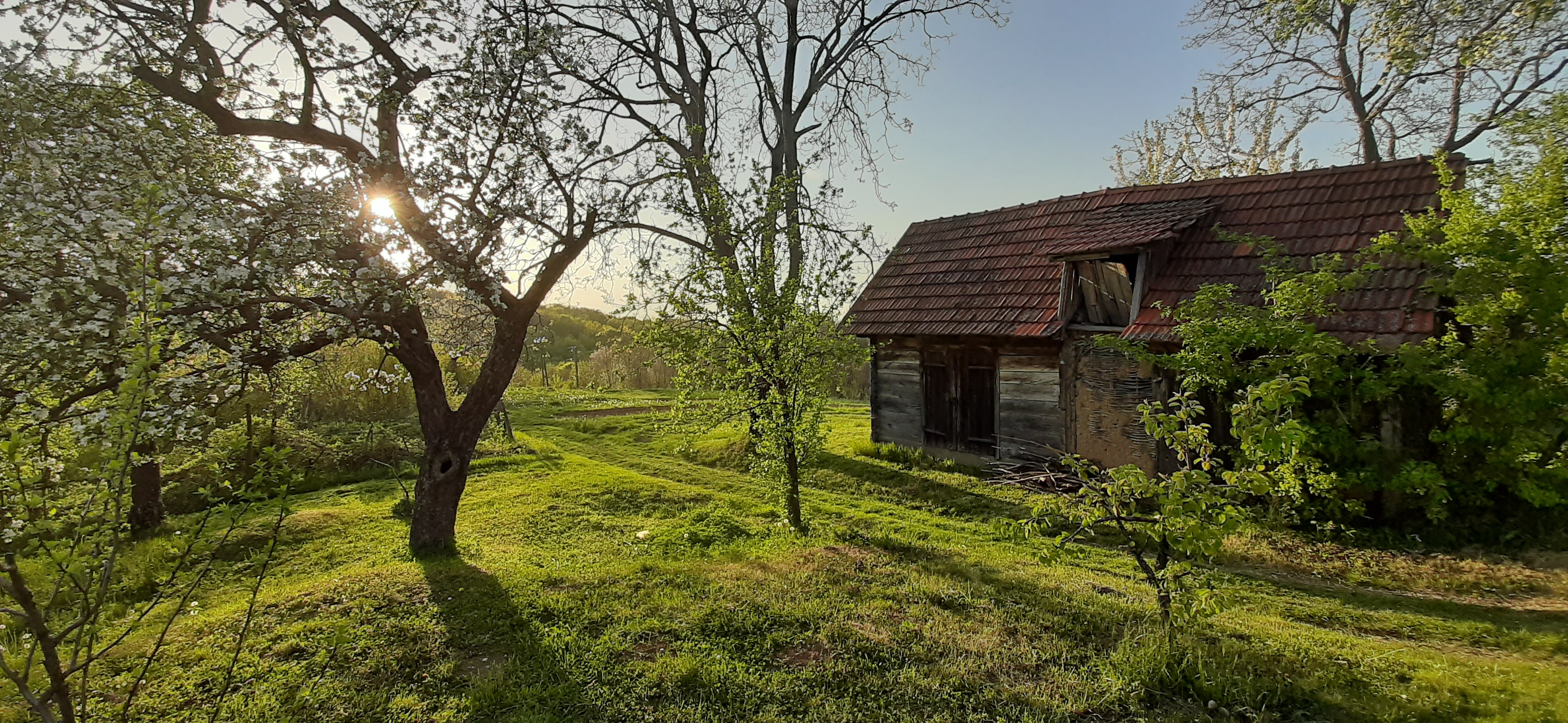
Scene of Laz Stubicki in Hrvatsko Zagorje, Croatia

Laz Stubički is a village in northern Croatia. It is connected by the D29 highway. It is close to Laz Bistrički, its sister village further north on the D29, and Zagreb- which is the northwestern capital of Croatia, south down the D29.
