= Prepuštovec, Zagreb =

Prepuštovec
- Village
- Location within Croatia
- Country: Croatia
- County: City of Zagreb
- City District: Sesvete

Area
  - Total: 0.85 sq mi (2.2 km^{2})

Population (2021)
  - Total: 284
  - Density: 330/sq mi (130/km^{2})
- Time zone: UTC+1 (CET)
  - Summer (DST): UTC+2 (CEST)

Prepuštovec is a village part of the City of Zagreb, Croatia, connected by the D29 highway. It is formally a settlement (naselje) of Zagreb, the capital of Croatia.

== Demographics ==
Its population was 284 in the 2021 census and 332 in the 2011 census.
