= Završje Belečko =

Settlement in Krapina-Zagorje County, Croatia

- Settlement
- Interactive map of Završje Belečko
- Location of Završje Belečko in Croatia
- Coordinates: 46°08′20″N 16°08′38″E
- Country: Croatia
- County: Krapina-Zagorje
- City: Zlatar

Area
  - Total: 0.7 km^{2} (0.27 sq mi)

Population (2021)
  - Total: 56
  - Density: 80/km^{2} (210/sq mi)
- Time zone: UTC+1 (CET)
  - Summer (DST): UTC+2 (CEST)
- Postal code: 49250 Zlatar
- Area code: +385 (0)49

Završje Belečko is a settlement in the City of Zlatar in Croatia. In 2021, its population was 56.

== Demographics ==
Završje Belečko: Population trends 1857–2021
v

population	25	33	43	59	62	57	60	75	82	113	87	86	99	117	65	62	56
	1857	1869	1880	1890	1900	1910	1921	1931	1948	1953	1961	1971	1981	1991	2001	2011	2021

Sources: Croatian Bureau of Statistics publications
