= Poljanica Bistrička =

Coordinates: 46°02′N 16°08′E

- Village
- Interactive map of Poljanica Bistrička
- Country: Croatia
- County: Krapina-Zagorje County

Area
  - Total: 7.5 km^{2} (2.9 sq mi)

Population (2021)
  - Total: 292
  - Density: 39/km^{2} (100/sq mi)
- Time zone: UTC+1 (CET)
  - Summer (DST): UTC+2 (CEST)

Poljanica Bistrička is a village in Croatia.
