= Ervenik Zlatarski, Zlatar =

Ervenik Zlatarski
- Village
- Location within Croatia
- Coordinates: 46°4′35″N 16°6′9″E
- Country: Croatia
- County: Krapina-Zagorje County
- Municipality: Zlatar

Area
  - Total: 1.3 km^{2} (0.50 sq mi)

Population (2021)
  - Total: 23
  - Density: 18/km^{2} (46/sq mi)
- Time zone: UTC+1 (CET)
  - Summer (DST): UTC+2 (CEST)

Ervenik Zlatarski is a village in Croatia.
