= Podgrađe, Krapina-Zagorje County =

Podgrađe
- Village
- Location within Croatia
- Coordinates: 46.024°N 16.091°E
- Country: Croatia
- County: Krapina-Zagorje
- Municipality: Marija Bistrica

Area
  - Total: 2.9 km^{2} (1.1 sq mi)

Population (2021)
  - Total: 302
  - Density: 100/km^{2} (270/sq mi)
- Time zone: UTC+1 (CET)
  - Summer (DST): UTC+2 (CEST)
- Postal code: 49246 Marija Bistrica

Podgrađe is a village in Zagorje, Croatia.
