= Selnica, Krapina-Zagorje County =

Selnica
- Village
- Location within Croatia
- Coordinates: 46°0′56″N 16°5′36″E
- Country: Croatia
- County: Krapina-Zagorje County
- Municipality: Marija Bistrica

Population (2011)
  - Total: 653
- Time zone: UTC+1 (CET)
  - Summer (DST): UTC+2 (CEST)

Selnica is a village in Zagorje, northern Croatia.
