= Podgorje Bistričko =

Coordinates: 45°59′38″N 16°07′52″E

- Village
- Interactive map of Podgorje Bistričko
- Country: Croatia
- County: Krapina-Zagorje County

Area
  - Total: 13.2 km^{2} (5.1 sq mi)

Population (2021)
  - Total: 849
  - Density: 64.3/km^{2} (167/sq mi)
- Time zone: UTC+1 (CET)
  - Summer (DST): UTC+2 (CEST)

Podgorje Bistričko is a village in Croatia.
