= Lobor =

- Municipality
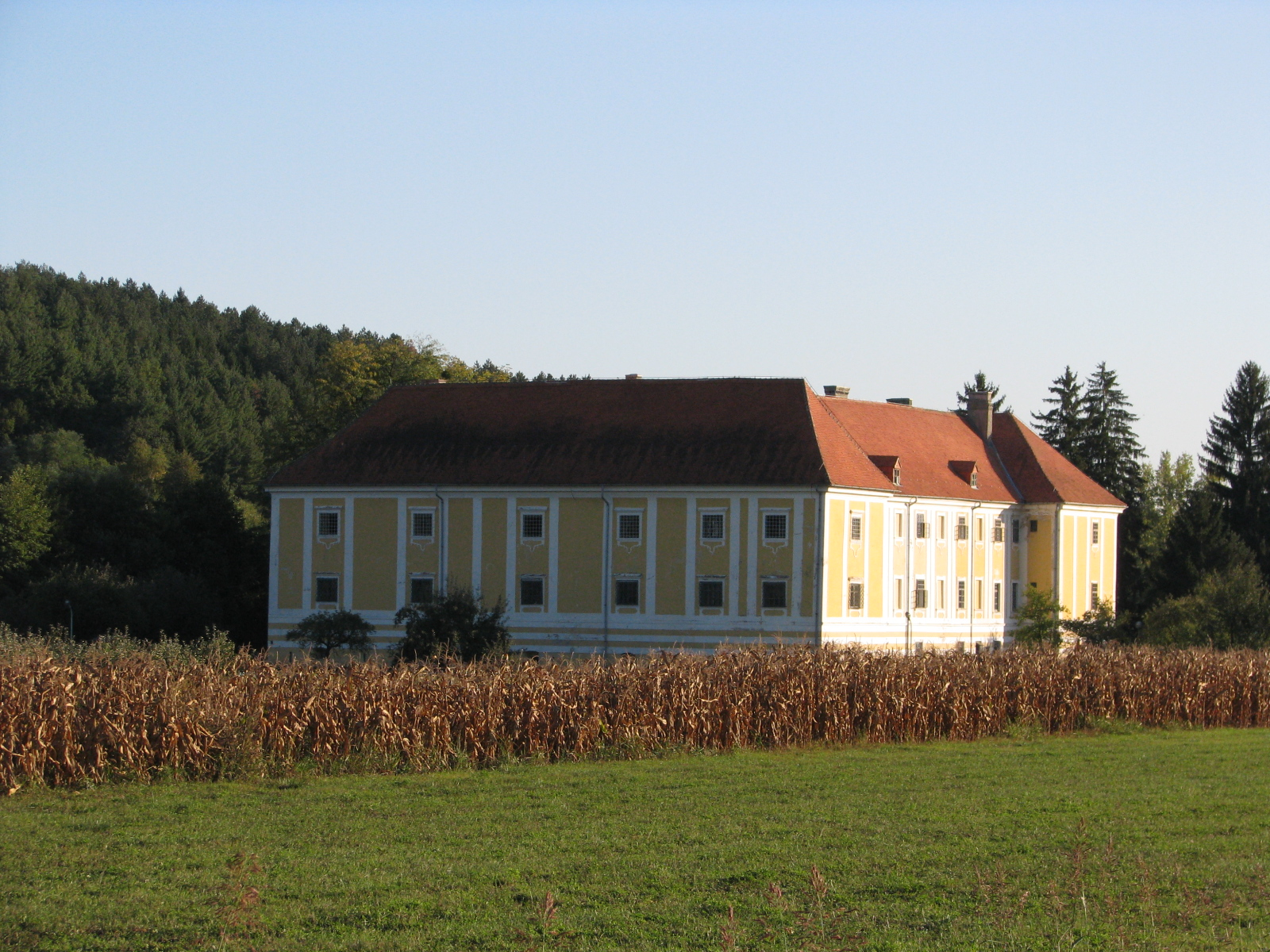
- Interactive map of Lobor
- Location within Krapina-Zagorje County Location within Croatia
- Coordinates: 46°9′0″N 16°3′36″E
- Country: Croatia
- County: Krapina-Zagorje County

Government
  - Municipal Mayor: Ljubica Jembrih (HDZ)

Area
  - Municipality: 43.2 km^{2} (16.7 sq mi)
  - Urban: 9.7 km^{2} (3.7 sq mi)

Population (2021)
  - Municipality: 2,703
  - Density: 62.6/km^{2} (162/sq mi)
  - Urban: 477
  - Urban density: 49/km^{2} (130/sq mi)
- Website: lobor.hr

Lobor is a village and municipality in the Krapina-Zagorje County, northern Croatia.

== History ==
Lobor was first mentioned in 1257 as Castrum Lobor. Its name probably comes from the Latin word Labor (laboratory). The Church of Our Lady of the Mountains was built on the slopes of Ivančica, on a hill called Gora. This church has been a Marian pilgrimage site for hundreds of years, but the very location on which it was built was a place of life even in prehistoric times, when a hillfort was built on it that controlled the surrounding area and the road communication that passed through a narrow gorge below it. In the 17th century, the Keglević family began building Loborgrad, one of the most valuable castles in Zagorje, after they abandoned Lobor. At the foot of Gora, in the Zazidje park, stands the votive chapel of St. Anthony and his statue, built by the Keglević family in 1703.

During the first year of the World War II, the Ustaše established a concentration camp in Lobor, also known as Loborgrad concentration camp, for Jewish and Serb women and children. At least 200 of them died in it.

On 13 April 2023, World Rally Championship driver Craig Breen died in an accident on a road between Lobor and Stari Golubovec during the Hyundai private testing before the 2023 Croatia Rally.

== Demographics ==
In the 2011 census, there were a total of 2,703 inhabitants in the area, in the following settlements:

- Cebovec, population 42
- Lobor, population 477
- Markušbrijeg, population 387
- Petrova Gora, population 405
- Stari Golubovec, population 162
- Šipki, population 105
- Velika Petrovagorska, population 224
- Vinipotok, population 311
- Vojnovec Loborski, population 324
- Završje Loborsko, population 266

In the same census, 98.96% of the population were Croats.

Lobor: Population trends 1857–2021
v

population	2759	3130	3603	3881	4772	5448	5282	5698	5907	5878	5312	4440	4289	4028	3669	3188	2703
	1857	1869	1880	1890	1900	1910	1921	1931	1948	1953	1961	1971	1981	1991	2001	2011	2021

Sources: Croatian Bureau of Statistics publications

== Administration ==
The current mayor of Lobor is Ljubica Jembrih (HDZ) and the Lobor Municipal Council consists of 13 seats.

Groups	Councilors per group
HDZ	10 / 13
SDP	3 / 13

== Sources ==
- Goldstein, Ivo; Lengel-Krizman, Narcisa (1997). Anti-semitism, Holocaust, anti-Fascism. Jewish Community. ISBN 978-953-96836-1-8.
- Centre (1998). Jews in Eastern Europe. The Centre.
- Čulinović, Ferdo (1970). Okupatorska podjela Jugoslavije. Vojnoizdavački.
