= Zlatar, Croatia =

Zlatar
- Town
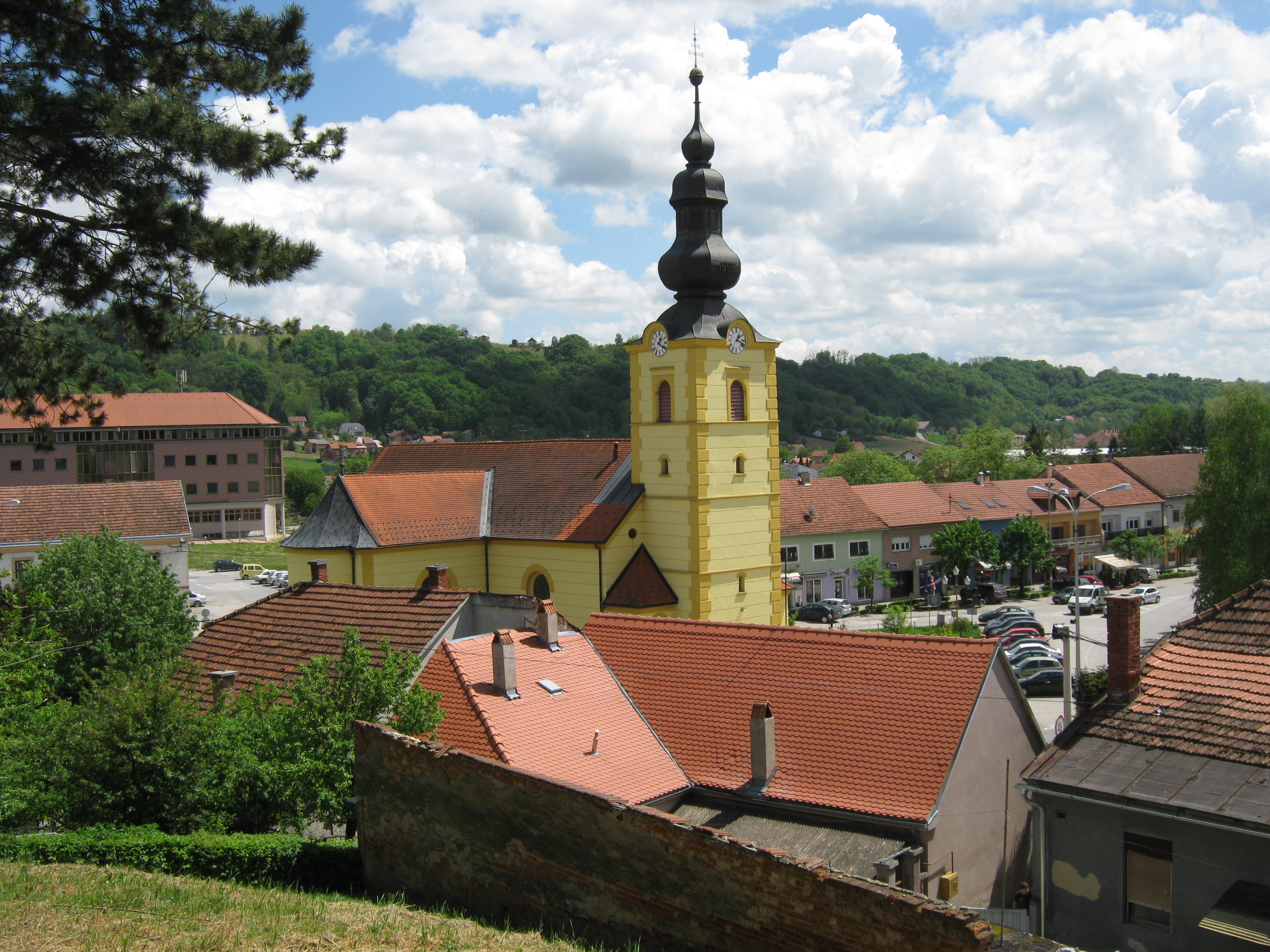
- View of Zlatar
- Interactive map of Zlatar
- Location of Zlatar in Croatia Zlatar (Croatia)
- Coordinates: 46.09°N 16.07°E
- Country: Croatia
- Region: Central Croatia (Hrvatsko Zagorje)
- County: Krapina-Zagorje County

Government
  - Mayor: Stjepan Škrlec (SDP)

Area
  - Town: 76.0 km^{2} (29.3 sq mi)
  - Urban: 13.0 km^{2} (5.0 sq mi)

Population (2021)
  - Town: 5,574
  - Density: 73.3/km^{2} (190/sq mi)
  - Urban: 2,825
  - Urban density: 217/km^{2} (563/sq mi)
- Time zone: UTC+1 (Central European Time)
- Website: zlatar.hr

Zlatar is a town and municipality in Krapina-Zagorje County in Croatia.

== History ==
The oldest mention of the place is as Zlatharia owned by the Bedeković family from the late 13th century. The name Zlatar is mentioned in its present form in 1566 as "possessio Zlatar" which belonged to the Aranyassy family. In 1699, the center of the church parish was transferred from Martinšćina to Zlatar, where a new parish church was built in 1762. Priest Ivan Gundak started the first elementary school in 1666 and in 1862 a new school was built.

During the rule of Ivan Mažuranić, Zlatar became a municipal and district seat, and in 1875 became the capital of the sub-county. In 1873, the first reading room was established in Zlatar, which had about seventy members. In 1907, a telephone was introduced in Zlatar. Many societies and associations were founded like a branch of the Croatian Falcon and the “Lastavica” cycling club. In the same year, two weekly papers began to be published: “Hrvatska Hrvatom” by the Party of Rights and “Zlatarski tjednik” by the Croat-Serb Coalition. In the 1935 Yugoslavian parliamentary election, representatives of the Croatian Peasant Party won in the Zlatar district. In 1937, Mirko Sviben became mayor, and among his first actions was to once again display the Croatian flag and have Cyrillic inscriptions removed from Zlatar. In the first parliamentary elections in Croatia in 1990, the HDZ won the majority of votes in Zlatar.

== Demographics ==
In the 2021 census, there were 5,574 inhabitants in the following settlements:

- Belec, population 316
- Borkovec, population 205
- Cetinovec, population 115
- Donja Batina, population 310
- Donja Selnica, population 151
- Ervenik Zlatarski, population 23
- Gornja Batina, population 207
- Gornja Selnica, population 164
- Juranšćina, population 162
- Ladislavec, population 160
- Martinšćina, population 340
- Petruševec, population 114
- Ratkovec, population 98
- Repno, population 190
- Šćrbinec, population 9
- Vižanovec, population 111
- Završje Belečko, population 56
- Zlatar, population 2,825
- Znož, population 18

In the 2021 census, the absolute majority of the population were Croats at 98.65%.

Town of Zlatar: Population trends 1857–2021
v

population	4438	5016	5832	6675	7569	8420	8188	8728	8822	8774	8001	7470	7045	6715	6506	6096	5574
	1857	1869	1880	1890	1900	1910	1921	1931	1948	1953	1961	1971	1981	1991	2001	2011	2021

Sources: Croatian Bureau of Statistics publications

== Administration ==
The current mayor of Zlatar is Jasenka Auguštan-Pentek (SDP) and the Zlatar Town Council consists of 13 seats.

Groups	Councilors per group
SDP-Reformists	9 / 13
HDZ-HSU	4 / 13

== Sports ==
The local chapter of the HPS is HPD "Oštrc", which had 21 members in 1936 under the Josip Rauer presidency. In 1937, 1 major and 9 minor expeditions were organised. Membership fell to 13 in 1938.
