= D24 road (Croatia) =

State road in northwestern Croatia

D24 state road

Route information
- Length: 60.4 km (37.5 mi)

Major junctions
- From: D29 in Zlatar Bistrica
- D3 in Novi Marof D22 in Novi Marof; A4 in Novi Marof interchange D526 in Varaždinske Toplice
- To: D2 near Ludbreg

Location
- Country: Croatia
- Counties: Krapina-Zagorje, Varaždin
- Major cities: Zlatar Bistrica, Novi Marof, Varaždinske Toplice, Ludbreg

Highway system
- Highways in Croatia

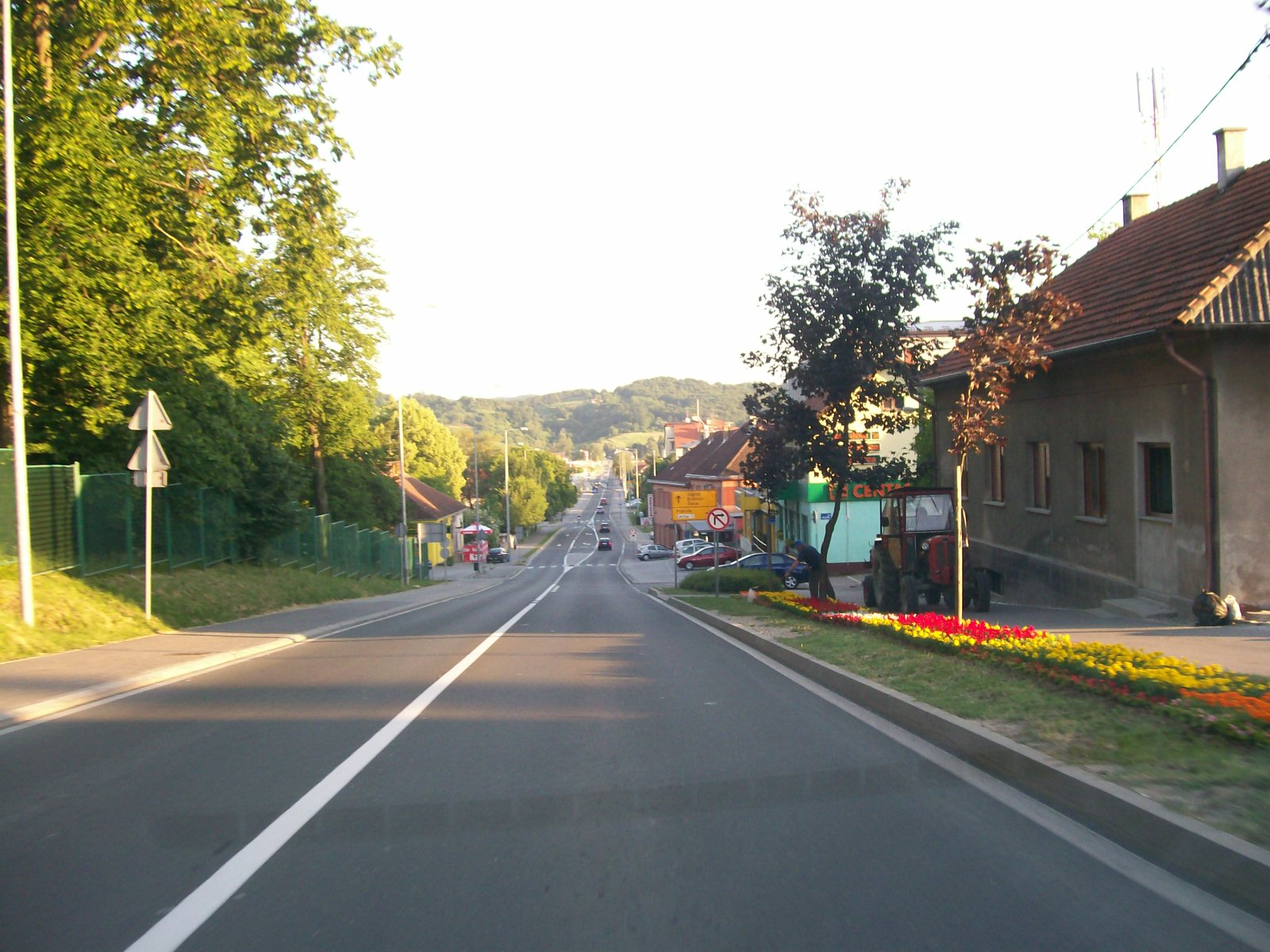
Novi Marof, on the D24 road route

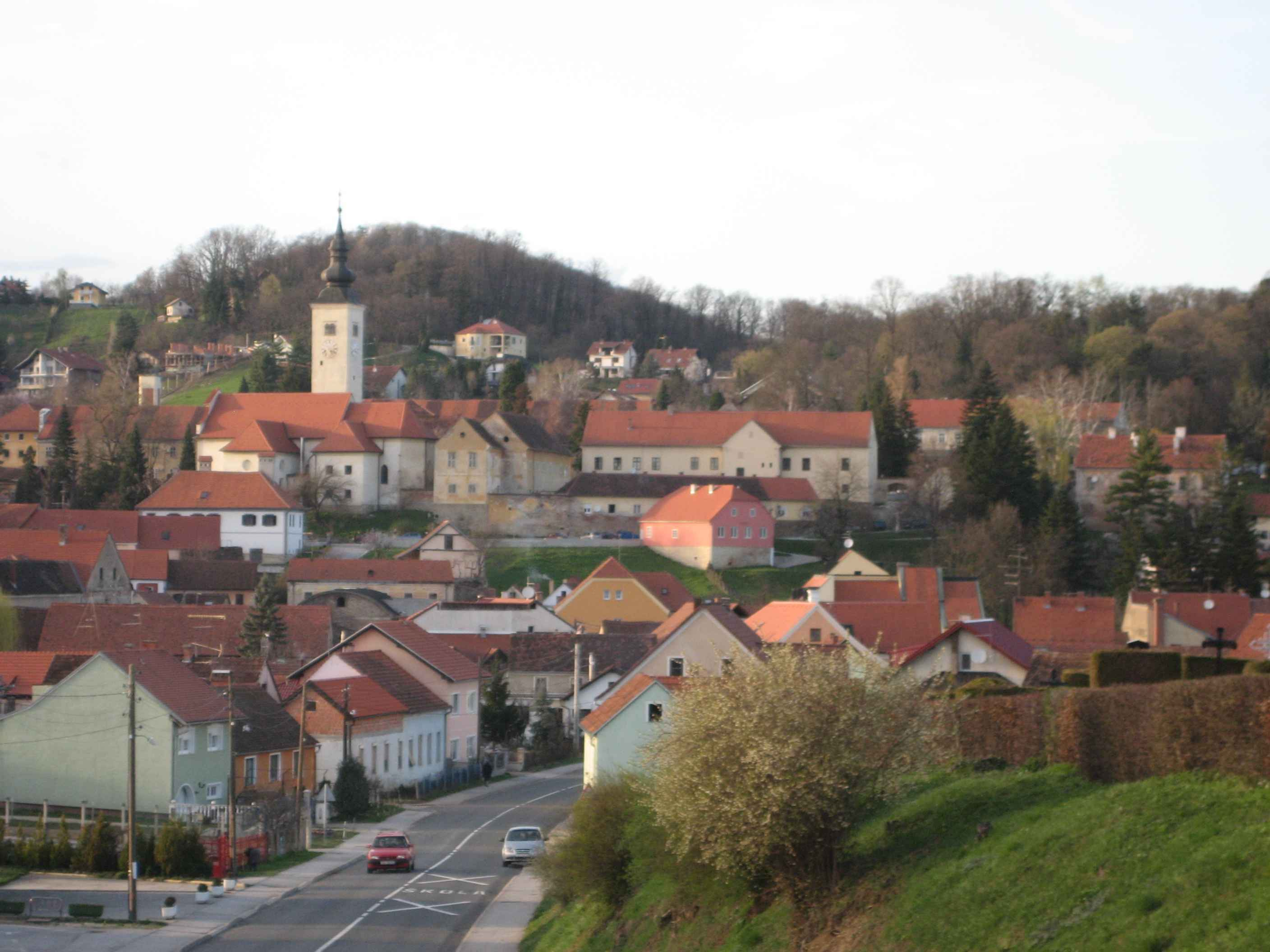
Varaždinske Toplice, on the D24 road route

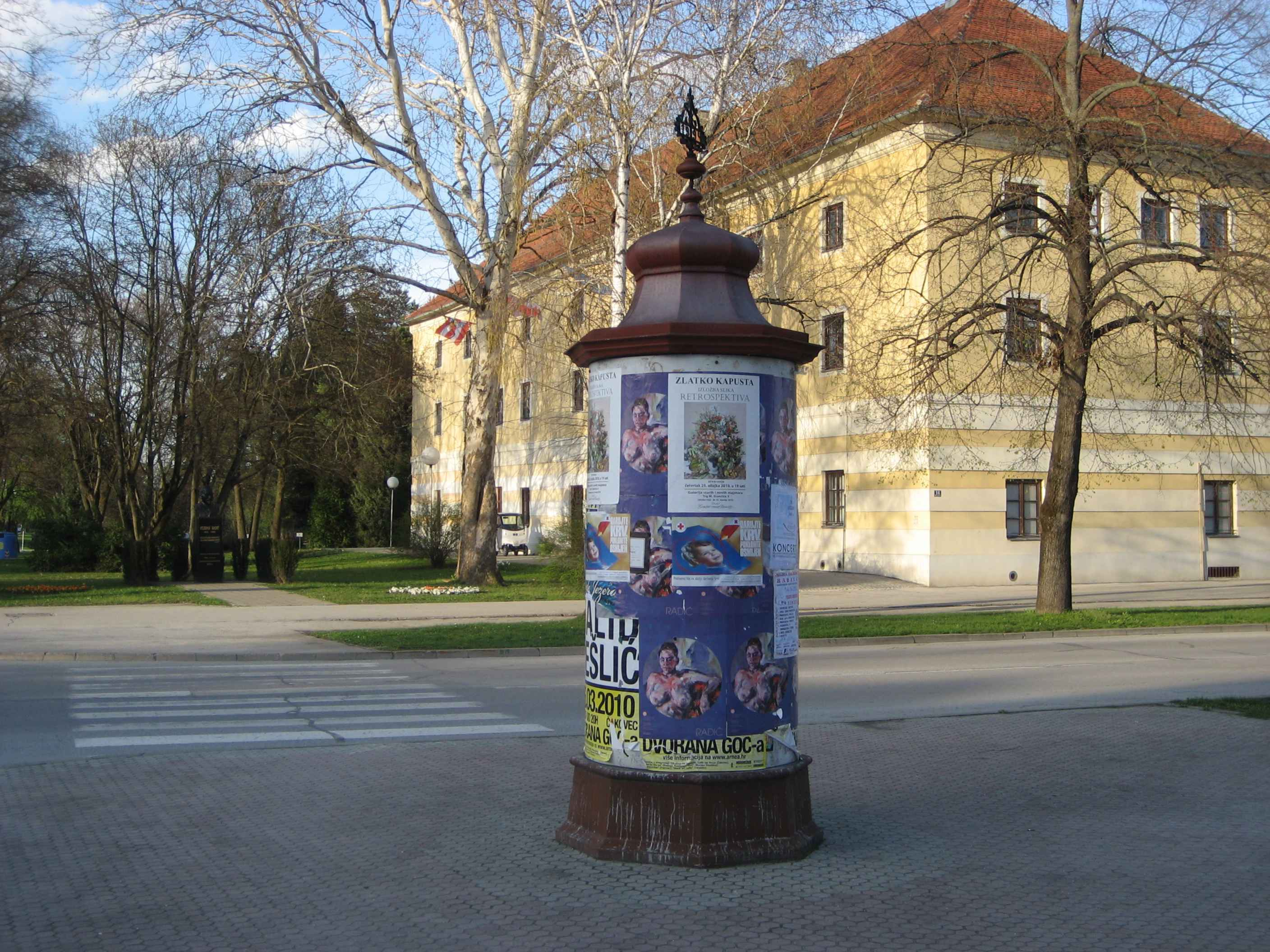
Ludbreg, at the eastern terminus of the D24 road

D24 is a state road in the northwestern Croatia connecting Zlatar Bistrica on the D29 state road, near the D14 expressway Zlatar Bistrica interchange, Novi Marof on the D3 state road, the A4 motorway Novi Marof interchange and Ludbreg on the D2 state road. The road is 60.4 km (37.5 mi) long.

Like all other state roads in Croatia, the D24 is managed and maintained by Hrvatske ceste, a state-owned company.

== Traffic volume ==
Traffic is regularly counted and reported by Hrvatske ceste, operator of the road.

D24 traffic volume
Road	Counting site	AADT	ASDT	Notes
D24	1230 Konjščina	3,980	4,130	Adjacent to the Ž2170 junction.
D24	1226 Krapina Selo	2,479	2,430	Between the Ž2204 and Ž2171 junctions.
D24	1222 Novi Marof - west	2,909	3,519	Adjacent to the L25134 junction.
D24	1237 Ljubešćica	2,594	2,796	Adjacent to the Ž2136 junction.
D24	1309 Leskovec Toplički	1,240	1,401	Adjacent to the Ž2111 junction.

== Road junctions and populated areas ==
D24 junctions/populated areas
Type	Slip roads/Notes
	Zlatar Bistrica; D29 to Novi Golubovec (D35) (to the north) and to Marija Bistrica and Soblinec (D3) (to the south). Ž2264 to Bedekovčina and Zabok (D1) (to the west). The western terminus of the road.
	Veleškovec
	Lipovec
	Turnišće
	Ž2170 to Donja Batina and Gornja Batina.
	Local road to Bočadir.
	Local road to Donja Konjščina.
	Konjščina; Ž2204 to Marija Bistrica. D540 to Komin and A4 Komin interchange.
	Jelovec
	Galovec
	Krapina Selo
	Ž2171 to Hrašćina and Breznički Hum (D3).
	Budinšćina; Ž2131 to Zajezda. Ž2169 to Gornja Batina and Zlatar (D29).
	Podrute; Ž2107 to Bela.
	Ž2133 to Kamena Gorica.
	Jelenščak; Ž2134 to Donje Makojišće and D3 road.
	Topličica
	Madžarevo
	Ž2135 to Grana and D22 road.
	Novi Marof; D3 to Varaždin (D2) (to the north) and to Sveti Ivan Zelina and Zagreb (to the south). D22 to Križevci (to the east) - the D22 and D24 are concurrent to the east.
	A4 Novi Marof interchange to Varaždin and Zagreb. D22 to Križevci and Sveti Ivan Žabno (D28) (to the east). The D22 and D24 are concurrent to the west.
	Možđenec; Ž2136 to Ključ.
	Ljubeščica
	Kapela Kalnička
	Ž2109 to Oštrice and Presečno (D3).
	Varaždinske Toplice; D526 to the A4 motorway Varaždinske Toplice interchange. Ž2250 to Turčin (D3).
	Tuhovec; Ž2054 to Grešćevina, Jalžabet and Šemovec (D2).
	Jalšovec Svibovečki; Ž2110 to Drenovec.
	Ž2111 to Gornja Poljana and Grešćevina.
	Leskovec Toplički
	Slanje; Ž2074 to Križovljan (D2).
	Ž2262 to Ludbreg (D2)
	Poljanec; D2 to the A4 motorway Ludbreg interchange and Varaždin (to the west) and to Ludbreg and Koprivnica (to the east). The eastern terminus of the road.
