= Varaždinske Toplice =

- Town
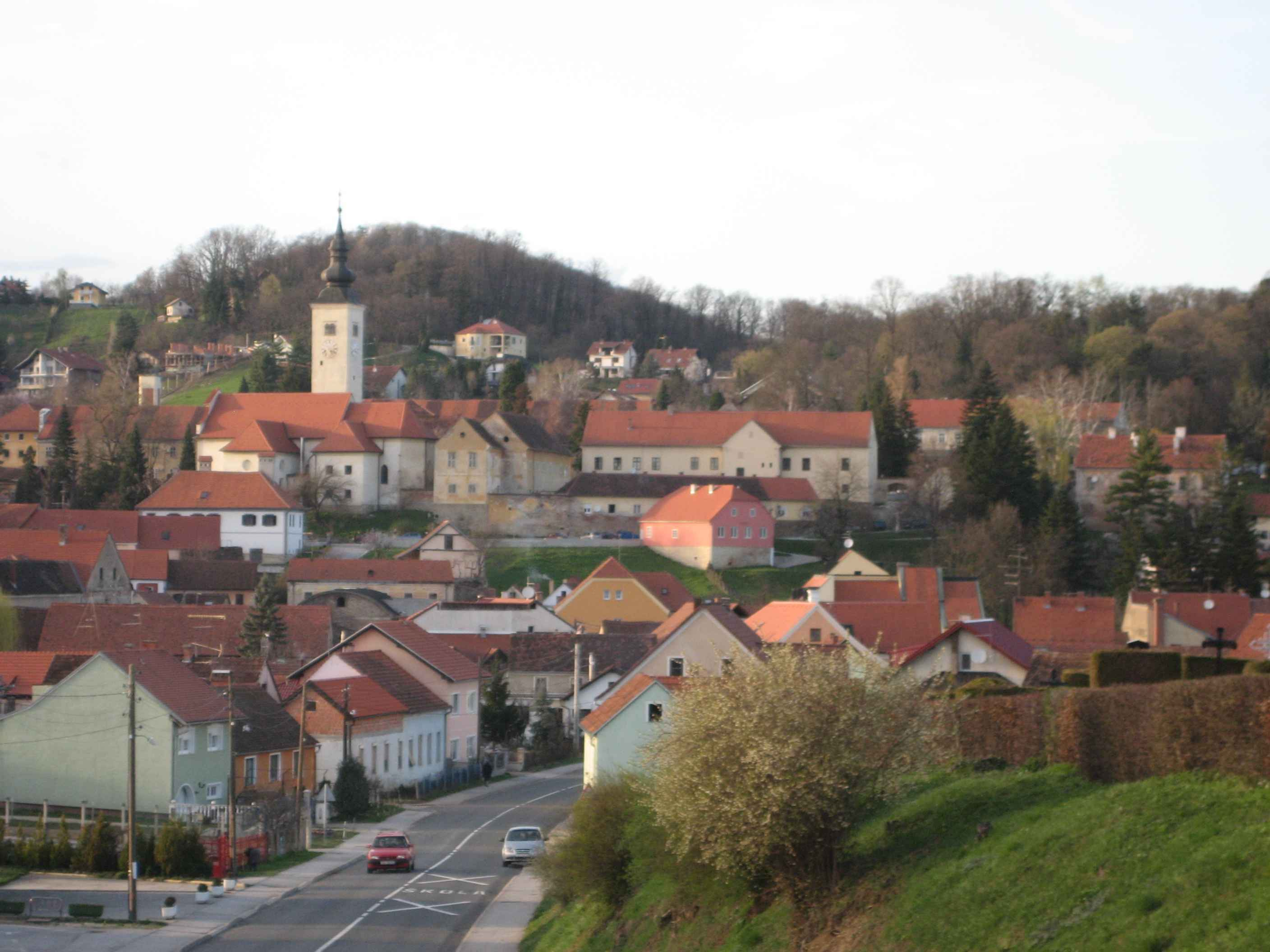
- View of Varaždinske Toplice

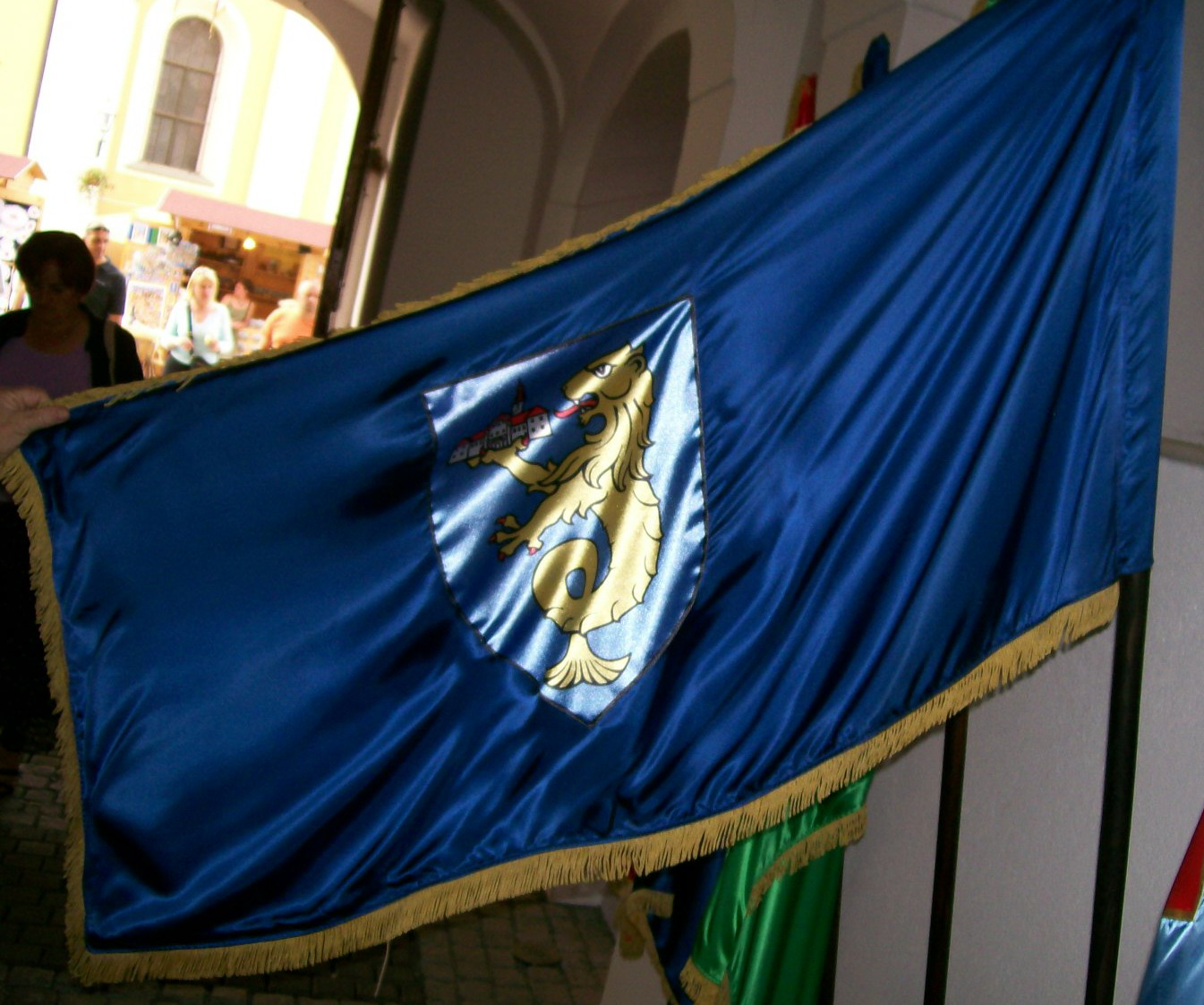
- Flag

- Location of Varaždinske Toplice in Croatia
- Coordinates: 46°12′29″N 16°25′17″E
- Country: Croatia
- Region: Central Croatia (Hrvatsko Zagorje)
- County: Varaždin County

Government
  - Mayor: Dragica Ratković (HDZ)
  - City Council: 17 members: • HDZ, HSLS (8); • HNS, SDP, HSS, HL (6); • Independent Marko Plišo (1)

Area
  - Town: 79.1 km^{2} (30.5 sq mi)
  - Urban: 6.9 km^{2} (2.7 sq mi)

Population (2021)
  - Town: 5,537
  - Density: 70.0/km^{2} (181/sq mi)
  - Urban: 1,606
  - Urban density: 230/km^{2} (600/sq mi)
- Time zone: UTC+1 (CET)
- Website: varazdinske-toplice.hr

Varaždinske Toplice (Hungarian: Varasdfürdő; German: Warasdin-Töplitz or Bad Warasdin; Kajkavian: Varaždinske Toplice) is a small town in northern Croatia's Varaždin County. The town has been well known throughout the centuries for its hot springs as well as a medical center. In Ancient Rome it was known as Aquae Iasae.

== Thermal Spa ==
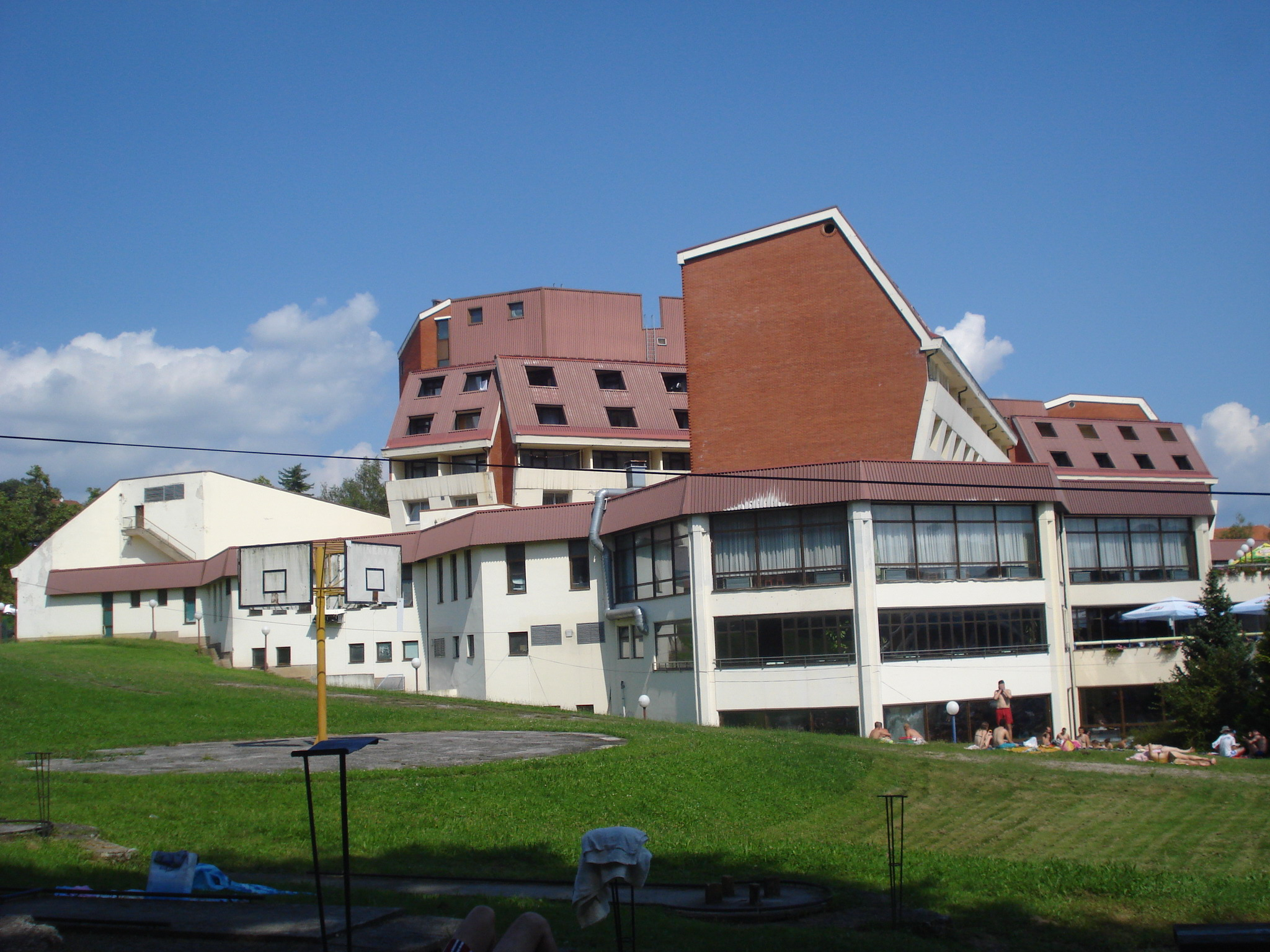
Minerva Hotel

Today, the town's biggest employers are "Hotel Minerva", built in 1981 with approx. 440 beds, and Hospital for Medicinal Rehabilitation "Terme" which is one of the leading rehabilitation centers for spinal cord and neurological injuries and disorders in Croatia. In 2013 Varaždin County, the formal owner of the hotel and the hospital, outlined a plan of building a new hospital which would continue on the expertise in spinal cord treatment. The plan also includes the construction of a completely new hotel, as well as an adaptation of the existing hotel Minerva. The value of proposed investments revolves around €80 million.

Varaždinske Toplice has two churches, the smaller one having been built in 13th century with the resting place of Antun Kukuljević, a supreme principal of all the schools in Croatia between 1836 and 1847, and father of Ivan Kukuljević Sakcinski, next to the church.

The town is also famous for being a site of a school in 1480 which is considered to be the oldest known school in the Balkan peninsula. The most recent school building for town's elementary school was opened in 1980 thus commemorating 500 years of education.

== Settlements ==
Nowadays, the town is also the center of a municipality which consists of the town itself and the surrounding villages. In the 2011 census, the population of the municipality was 6,364, composed of the following settlements:

Historical populations (town proper)
Year	Pop.	±%
1857	917	—
1869	1,141	+24.4%
1880	1,189	+4.2%
1890	1,256	+5.6%
1900	1,245	−0.9%
1910	1,250	+0.4%
1921	1,261	+0.9%
1931	1,248	−1.0%
1948	1,179	−5.5%
1953	1,282	+8.7%
1961	1,193	−6.9%
1971	1,293	+8.4%
1981	1,642	+27.0%
1991	1,891	+15.2%
2001	1,877	−0.7%
2011	1,765	−6.0%
2021	1,596	−9.6%

- Boričevec Toplički, population 40
- Črnile, population 162
- Čurilovec, population 131
- Donja Poljana, population 426
- Drenovec, population 361
- Gornja Poljana, population 269
- Grešćevina, population 140
- Hrastovec Toplički, population 176
- Jalševec Svibovečki, population 302
- Jarki Horvatićevi, population 47
- Leskovec Toplički, population 487
- Lovrentovec, population 118
- Lukačevec Toplički, population 55
- Martinkovec, population 66
- Petkovec Toplički, population 265
- Pišćanovec, population 73
- Retkovec Svibovečki, population 23
- Rukljevina, population 17
- Svibovec, population 302
- Škarnik, population 84
- Tuhovec, population 706
- Varaždinske Toplice, population 1,765
- Vrtlinovec, population 349
Town of Varaždinske Toplice: Population trends 1857–2021
v

population	4805	5564	6123	6989	7266	7818	7574	8016	8159	8138	7477	7495	7282	7236	6973	6364	5537
	1857	1869	1880	1890	1900	1910	1921	1931	1948	1953	1961	1971	1981	1991	2001	2011	2021

Sources: Croatian Bureau of Statistics publications

== Notable people ==
- Ana Bešenić, writer
- Nenad Brixy, journalist and writer
- Lavoslav Horvat, architect
- Ruža Pospiš-Baldani, opera singer

== Bibliography ==
- Matoničkin, Ivo (1957). "Ekološka istraživanja faune termalnih voda Hrvatskog Zagorja" [Ecological Investigations of the Fauna of the Hot Springs of Hrvatsko Zagorje]. Rad Jugoslavenske akademije znanosti i umjetnosti. Odjel za prirodne nauke (in Serbo-Croatian). 733: 139–205. ISSN 1330-5697.
- Vouk, Vale (1916). "Biološka istraživanja termalnih voda Hrvatskoga zagorja" [Biological Explorations of the Hot Springs of Hrvatsko Zagorje]. Prirodoslovna istraživanja Hrvatske i Slavonije (in Serbo-Croatian). 8: 1–17. ISSN 1333-2325.
