= Konjščina =

- Village
- Interactive map of Konjščina
- Location within Krapina-Zagorje County Location within Croatia
- Coordinates: 46°4′12″N 16°10′48″E
- Country: Croatia
- County: Krapina-Zagorje County

Government
  - Mayor: Anita Curiš Krok (SDP)

Area
  - Village: 44.3 km^{2} (17.1 sq mi)
  - Urban: 1.2 km^{2} (0.46 sq mi)

Population (2021)
  - Village: 3,308
  - Density: 74.7/km^{2} (193/sq mi)
  - Urban: 910
  - Urban density: 760/km^{2} (2,000/sq mi)
- Time zone: UTC+1 (CET)
  - Summer (DST): UTC+2 (CEST)
- Website: konjscina.hr

Konjščina (Croatian pronunciation: [kǒːɲʃtʃina]) is a village and municipality in Krapina-Zagorje County, northern Croatia. The town is about 30 km northeast of Zagreb. It is connected by the D24 highway and R201 railway.

== History ==
Konjščina was first mentioned in 1334 as a parish. The city is known for the nearby fort [hr], located where the Selnica Stream flows into the Krapina River. The stone stronghold, named Citadel Selnica (Kaštel Selnica, old name for Konjščina). The stronghold was first mentioned in 1477, in documents given by King Matthias Corvinus by which he allowed Kristofor and Ivan Konjski to build a fort in Selnica. The stronghold was different from others in Croatia. While forts were typically built on high ground, for the advantage of height, the stronghold at Konjščina was Croatia's first wasserburg (water castle) a fort surrounded by much water.

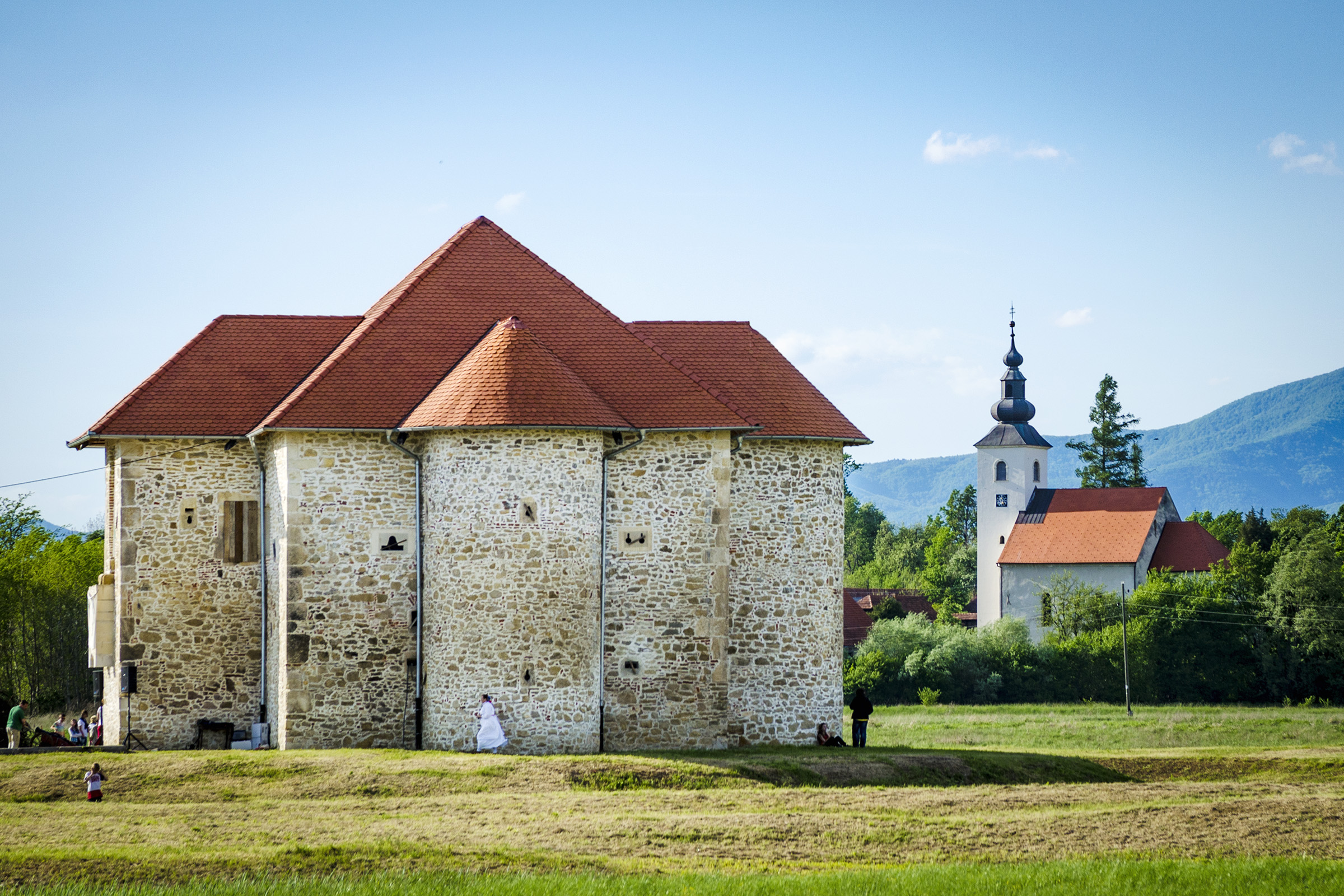
Konjščina fort

=== Battle of Konjščina Fort ===
Ban Nikola Zrinski decided to intercept Turkish troops near Konjščina in May 1545. On its campaign towards Styria in early May 1545, the Turkish army led by Ulama Pasha encamped near the Konjščina fortress. Opposing the Turks was the Croatian ban's army led by Prince Nikola Šubić Zrinski and Count Juraj Wildenstein. On May 4, 1545 the Turks suddenly crossed the ditch and attacked the unprepared Croatian troops, who scattered, with Zrinski and Wildenstein seeking refuge in the Konjščina fortress.

== Demographics ==
In the 2021 census, there were a total of 3,308 inhabitants in the area, in the following settlements:

- Bočadir, population 142
- Bočaki, population 183
- Brlekovo, population 57
- Donja Batina, population 81
- Donja Konjščina, population 128
- Galovec, population 117
- Gornja Konjščina, population 101
- Jelovec, population 135
- Jertovec, population 610
- Klimen, population 115
- Konjščina, population 910
- Kosovečko, population 87
- Krapina Selo, population 118
- Pešćeno, population 131
- Sušobreg, population 194
- Turnišće, population 199

In the same census, an absolute majority of population were Croats at 98.43%.

Konjščina: Population trends 1857–2021
v

population	2988	3522	3974	4748	5492	6259	6735	7097	6982	7024	6823	5867	5418	5040	4074	3790	3308
	1857	1869	1880	1890	1900	1910	1921	1931	1948	1953	1961	1971	1981	1991	2001	2011	2021

Sources: Croatian Bureau of Statistics publications

== Administration ==
The current mayor of Konjščina is Anita Curiš Krok (SDP) and the Konjščina Municipal Council consists of 13 seats.

Groups	Councilors per group
SDP-HSS	7 / 13
HDZ-HSU	3 / 13
Independents	3 / 13
