= Jelovec =

Jelovec may refer to:

In Croatia:

- Jelovec, Krapina-Zagorje County, a village near Konjščina
- Jelovec Voćanski in the Municipality of Donja Voća

In Slovenia:

- Jelovec, Maribor, a settlement in the Municipality of Maribor
- Jelovec pri Makolah, a settlement in the Municipality of Makole
- Jelovec, Sevnica, a settlement in the Municipality of Sevnica
- Jelovec, Sodražica, a settlement in the Municipality of Sodražica
- Jelovec, Majšperk, a hamlet of Jelovice in the Municipality of Majšperk
