= Plitvica (river) =

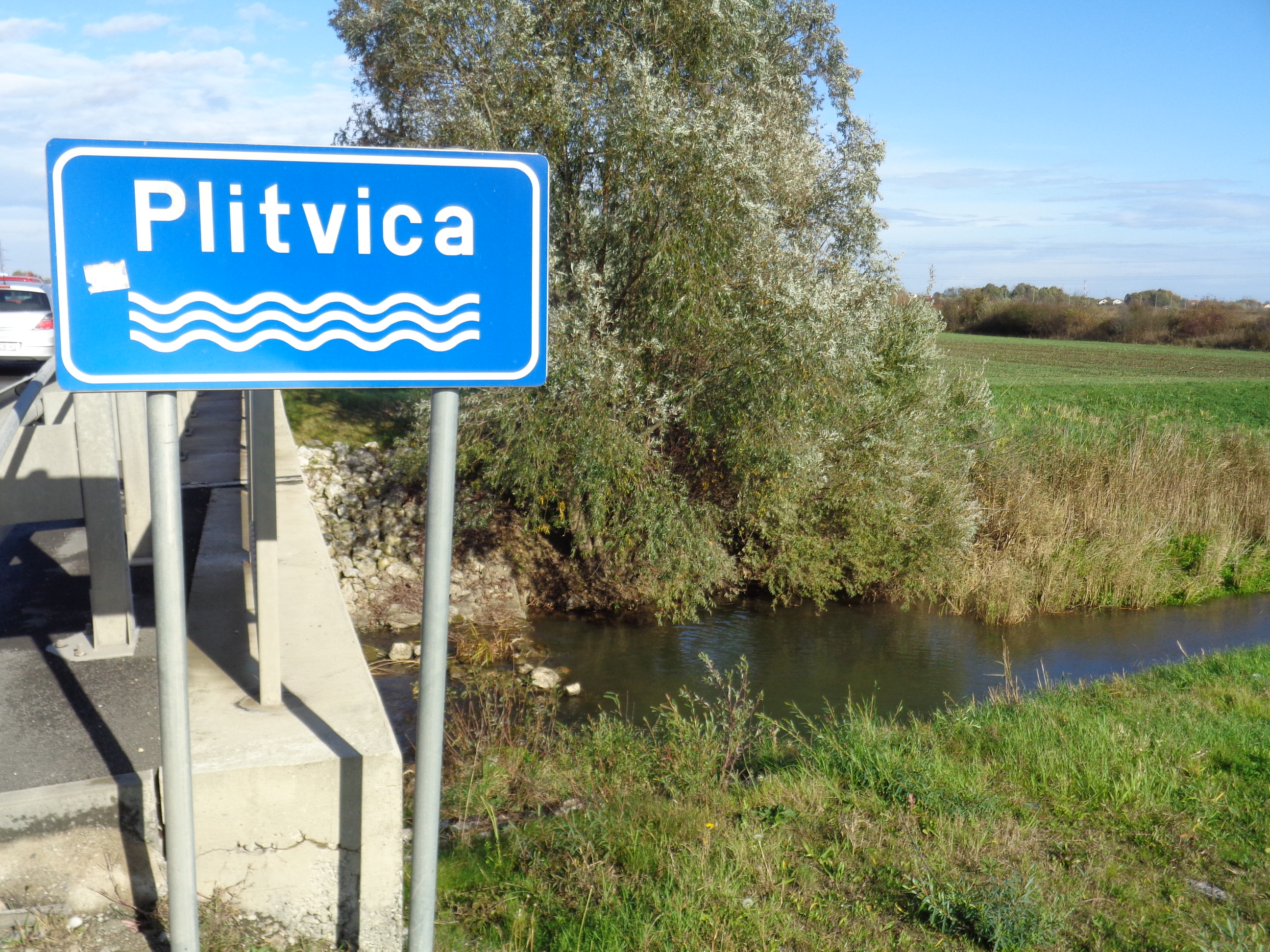
- The Plitvica at Varaždin

Location
- Country: Croatia

Physical characteristics
- Mouth
  - location: Drava
  - coordinates: 46.3081°N 16.7373°E
- Length: 65 km (40 mi)
- Basin size: 272 km^{2} (105 sq mi)

Basin features
- Progression: Drava→ Danube→ Black Sea

The Plitvica is a river in northern Croatia, a right tributary of the Drava. It is 65 kilometres (40 mi) long and its basin covers an area of 272 square kilometres (105 sq mi).

The Plitvica rises in the hilly areas of Maceljsko gorje, near of the eponymous village of Plitvica Voćanska, near Donja Voća. It flows southeast until it turns east near Maruševec, and continues through the lowland south of Varaždin and parallel to Drava, through Sveti Đurđ (north of Ludbreg), until it merges into the Drava north of Veliki Bukovec.
