= D526 road =

Road in Croatia

D526 state road

Route information
- Length: 1.2 km (0.75 mi)

Major junctions
- From: D24 in Varaždinske Toplice
- To: A4 in Varaždinske Toplice interchange

Location
- Country: Croatia
- Counties: Varaždin

Highway system
- Highways in Croatia

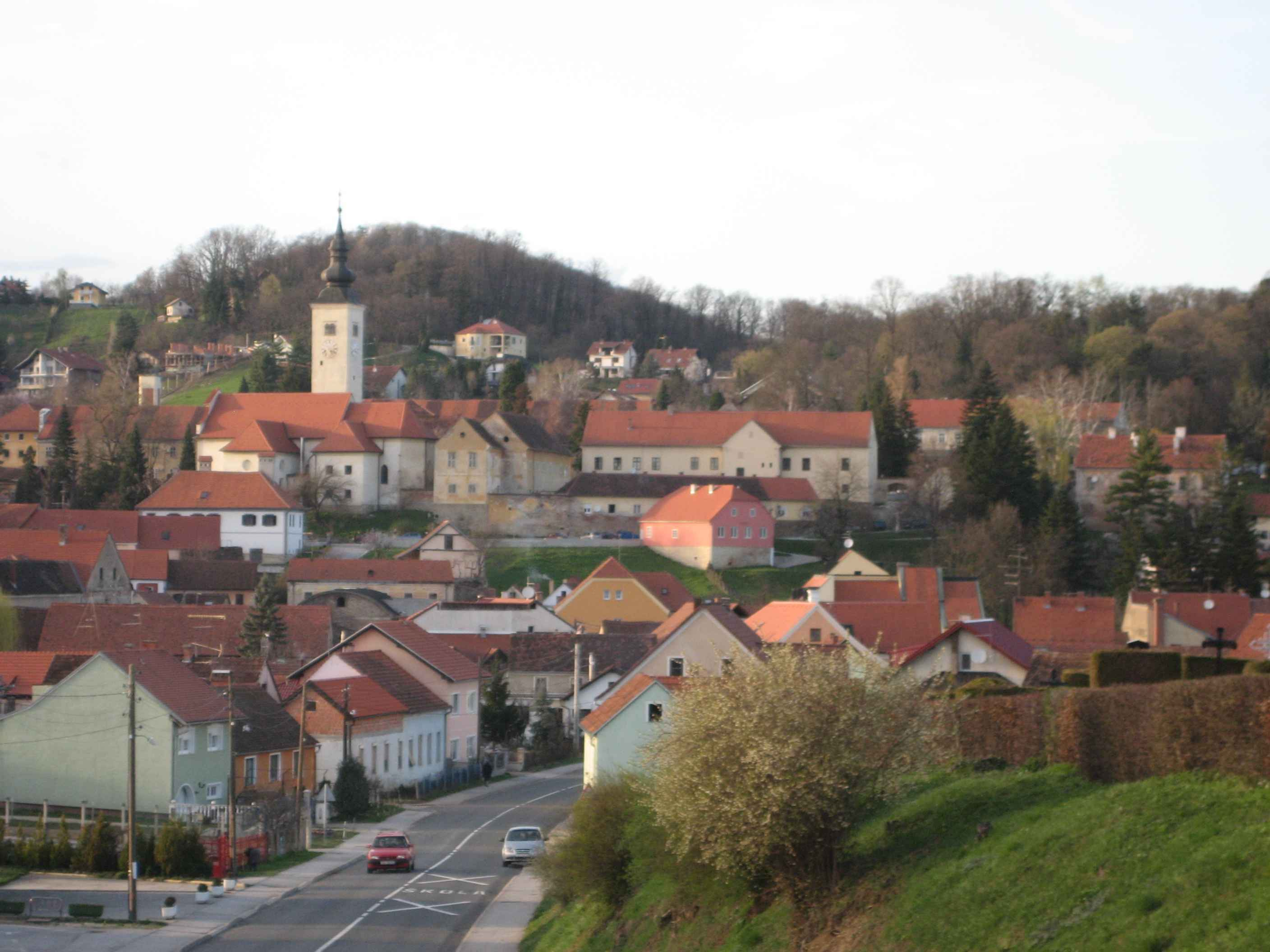
Varaždinske Toplice, at the eastern terminus of the D526 road

D526 connects the A4 motorway Varaždinske Toploce interchange to the D24 state road in Varaždinske Toplice spa town. The road is 1.2 km (0.75 mi) long.

Just like all other state roads in Croatia, the D526 is managed and maintained by Hrvatske ceste, a state-owned company.

== Traffic volume ==
The D526 state road traffic volume is not reported by Hrvatske ceste. However, they regularly count and report traffic volume on the A4 motorway Varaždinske Toplice interchange, which connects to the D526 road only, thus permitting the D526 road traffic volume to be accurately calculated. The report includes no information on ASDT volumes.

D526 traffic volume
Road	Counting site	AADT	ASDT	Notes
A4	Varaždinske Toplice interchange	706	n/a	Southbound A4 traffic leaving the motorway at the interchange.
A4	Varaždinske Toplice interchange	402	n/a	Southbound A4 traffic entering the motorway at the interchange.
A4	Varaždinske Toplice interchange	407	n/a	Northbound A4 traffic leaving the motorway at the interchange.
A4	Varaždinske Toplice interchange	715	n/a	Northbound A4 traffic entering the motorway at the interchange.
D526	Varaždinske Toplice interchange	2,230	n/a	Total traffic entering/leaving the A4 motorway from/to D526.

== Road junctions and populated areas ==
D526 junctions/populated areas
Type	Slip roads/Notes
	Varaždinske Toplice; D24 to Novi Marof (D3) (to the south) and to Ludbreg (D2) (to the north). The eastern terminus of the road.
	A4 in Varaždinske Toplice interchange, to Varaždin and Čakovec (to the north) and to Zagreb (to the south). The western terminus of the road.

== See also ==
- A4 motorway
