= Ljubelj =

Ljubelj may refer to:

- Ljubelj Pass, a mountain pass in the Alps between Austria and Slovenia
- Ljubelj, Croatia, a village near Ljubešćica
- Ljubelj Kalnički, a village near Ljubešćica, Croatia
