= Jalševec Svibovečki =

- Village
- Location within Croatia
- Coordinates: 46.210135°N 16.481638°E
- Country: Croatia
- County: Varaždin County
- Municipality: Varaždinske Toplice

Area
  - Total: 5.3 km^{2} (2.0 sq mi)

Population (2021)
  - Total: 271
  - Density: 51/km^{2} (130/sq mi)
- Time zone: UTC+1 (CET)
  - Summer (DST): UTC+2 (CEST)

Jalševec Svibovečki is a village in Croatia. It is connected by the D24 highway.
