= Topličica, Varaždin County =

Coordinates: 46°09′18″N 16°12′22″E

Topličica
- Village
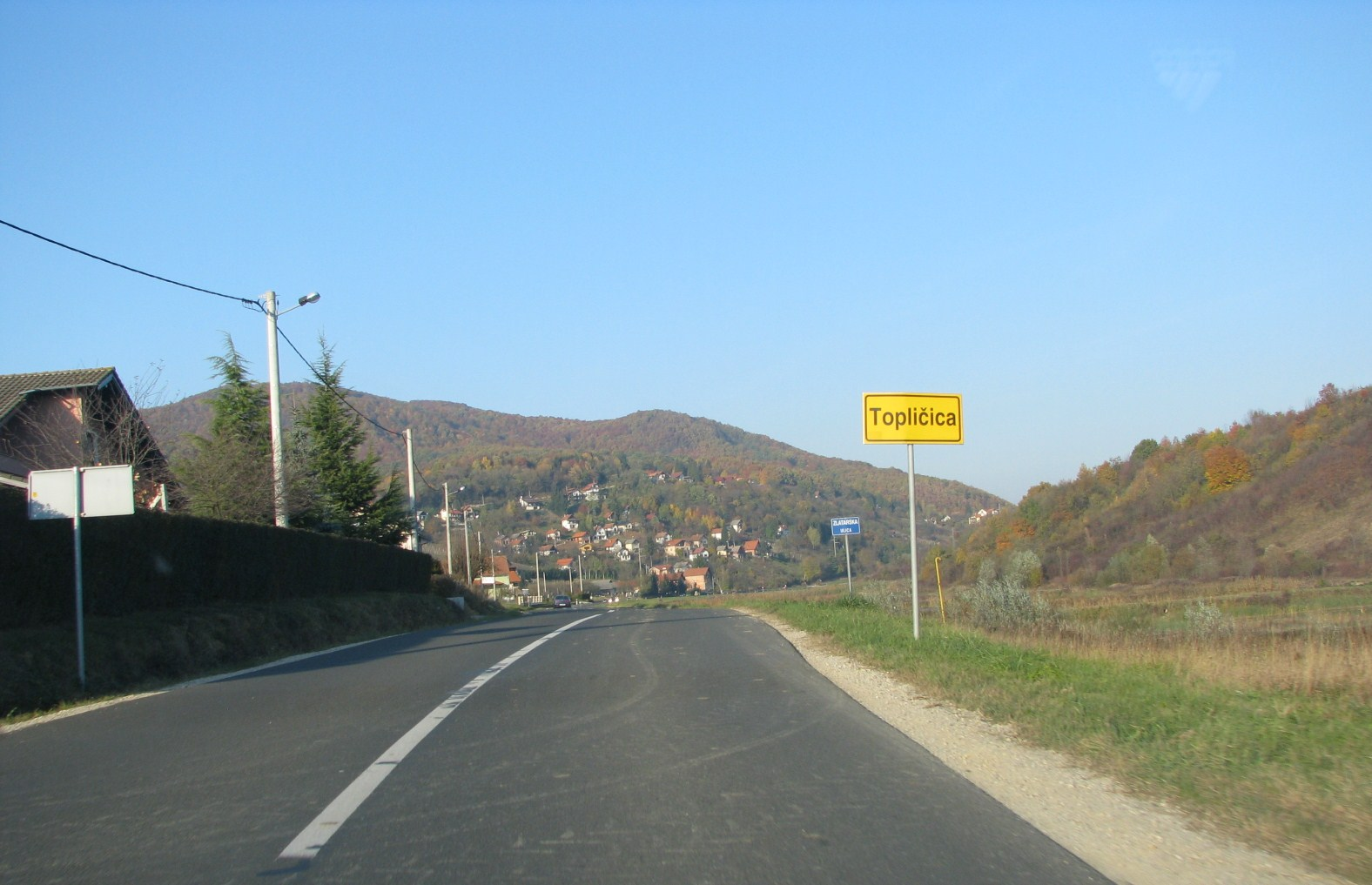
- Entrance to the village Topličica, Varaždin County
- Interactive map of Topličica
- Country: Croatia
- County: Varaždin County
- City: Novi Marof

Area
  - Total: 1.0 km^{2} (0.39 sq mi)

Population (2021)
  - Total: 195
  - Density: 190/km^{2} (510/sq mi)
- Time zone: UTC+1 (CET)
  - Summer (DST): UTC+2 (CEST)

Topličica is a village near Novi Marof in Croatia. It is connected by the D24 highway.

== Bibliography ==
- Vouk, Vale (1916). "Biološka istraživanja termalnih voda Hrvatskoga zagorja" [Biological Explorations of the Hot Springs of Hrvatsko Zagorje]. Prirodoslovna istraživanja Hrvatske i Slavonije (in Serbo-Croatian). 8: 1–17. ISSN 1333-2325.
