= Catiena gens =

Plebeian family of the late Roman Republic and early Empire

The gens Catiena was an obscure plebeian family from the late Roman Republic and early Empire. The only member of this gens mentioned by Roman writers is Titus Catienus, an acquaintance of Cicero. Other Catieni are known from inscriptions, and at least one attained a number of magistracies and other offices in the Roman state during the reign of Tiberius.

== Origin ==
The nomen Catienus belongs to a class of gentilicia formed primarily from other nomina, or occasionally place names, with stems ending in -i, where the common derivative suffix -inus becomes -enus. Nothing definite is known of the geographical origin of the Catieni, but at least two of them bore the cognomen Sabinus, indicating that they might have claimed Sabine ancestry, or were in some manner identified with Sabine customs or habits.

== Praenomina ==
The Catieni used a variety of common praenomina, including Publius, Gaius, Marcus, Titus, Lucius, and Sextus, all of which were abundant at all periods of Roman history. They may also have used Spurius, an older praenomen that had fallen out of fashion by Imperial times, but was still occasionally used. However, by this period it was also used in filiations to indicate children whose fathers' names were unknown.

== Members ==
This list includes abbreviated praenomina. For an explanation of this practice, see filiation.

- Titus Catienus, for unspecified reasons was angry with Cicero's brother, Quintus. According to Cicero, Catienus was an eques of inferior character.
- Publius Catienus P. f. Sabinus, held a number of magistracies and other offices during the reign of Tiberius, including quaestor, tribune of the plebs, praetor, proconsul, prefect of the military treasury, Legatus Augusti, and curator of the banks and channels of the Tiber.
- Lucius Catienus Lucifer, buried at Aquinum in Latium, along with Titus Veturius, and the tomb's builder, whose name has not been preserved, in a sepulchre dating from the time of the Julio-Claudian dynasty.
- Marcus Catienus M. l. Eros, a freedman buried at Camerinum in Umbria, in a first-century tomb built by the freedmen and women Primigenius, Primigenia, Hesper, and Restitutus.
- Catiena Euphrosyne, built a first-century tomb for her daughter, Catiena Tertulla. The original site of the tomb is uncertain.
- Catiena Sp. f. Secunda, the wife of Marcus Pupius, was buried in a first-century family sepulchre at Mutina, built by her son, Marcus Pupius Rufus, for himself, Catiena, his cousin, Catienus Osbsequens, and his concubine, the freedwoman Allena Heuronoma.
- Catiena Tertulla, buried in a first century tomb built by her mother, Catiena Euphrosyne. The original site of the tomb is uncertain.
- Catienus Sp. f. Obsequens, buried in a first-century family sepulchre at Mutina in Cisalpine Gaul, built by his cousin, Marcus Pupius Rufus, for himself, his concubine, Allena Heuronoma, his mother, Catiena Secunda, and her nephew Obsequens.
- Gaius Catienus Abascantus, along with his daughter, Catiena Vitalis, built a family sepulchre at Rome, dating between the late first century and the middle of the second.
- Catiena C. f. Vitalis, along with her father, Gaius Catienus Abascantus, built a family sepulchre at Rome dating between the late first century and the middle of the second.
- Gaius Catienus, a soldier mentioned in an inscription from Rome, dating from AD 137.
- Catienia Fortunata, the wife of Gaius Valerius Priscus, chief magistrate at Poetovium in Pannonia Superior, mentioned in an libationary inscription at Aquae Iasae, dedicated to Isis and Serapis, and dating from the second or third century.

=== Undated Catieni ===
- Catienus, an infant born into slavery in the house of Julius Ceriales, was buried at Rome aged eight months, six days, in a tomb built by his master.
- Publius Catienus T. f. Festus, the son of Titus Vibius Catienus Sabinus and Maria Modia, buried at Rome, aged eleven years, six months, in a tomb built by his mother, apparently after his father's death.
- Catiena Sex. l. Hilara, a freedwoman buried at Aquinum, in a tomb dedicated by one or more of her children.
- Publius Catienus (Rufus?), named in a sepulchral inscription from Abellinum in Campania. Possibly the same person as Publius Catienus Sabinus, one of whose inscriptions is also from Abellinum.
- Titus Vibius Catienus Sabinus, the husband of Maria Modia and father of Publius Catienus Festus, a youth buried at Rome in a tomb built by his mother, evidently after Sabinus' death.

== See also ==
- List of Roman gentes

== Bibliography ==
- Marcus Tullius Cicero, Epistulae ad Quintum Fratrem.
- Dictionary of Greek and Roman Biography and Mythology, William Smith, ed., Little, Brown and Company, Boston (1849).
- Theodor Mommsen et alii, Corpus Inscriptionum Latinarum (The Body of Latin Inscriptions, abbreviated CIL), Berlin-Brandenburgische Akademie der Wissenschaften (1853–present).
- René Cagnat et alii, L'Année épigraphique (The Year in Epigraphy, abbreviated AE), Presses Universitaires de France (1888–present).
- George Davis Chase, "The Origin of Roman Praenomina", in Harvard Studies in Classical Philology, vol. VIII, pp. 103–184 (1897).
