= Jelenščak =

Coordinates: 46°08′54″N 16°16′47″E

- Village
- Interactive map of Jelenščak
- Country: Croatia
- County: Varaždin County
- Municipality: Novi Marof

Area
  - Total: 1.5 km^{2} (0.58 sq mi)

Population (2021)
  - Total: 161
  - Density: 110/km^{2} (280/sq mi)
- Time zone: UTC+1 (CET)
  - Summer (DST): UTC+2 (CEST)

Jelenščak is a village in Croatia's Varaždin County. It is connected by the D24 highway.
