= Madžarevo =

Coordinates: 46°10′05″N 16°18′29″E

- Village
- Interactive map of Madžarevo
- Country: Croatia
- County: Varaždin County
- Municipality: Novi Marof

Area
  - Total: 7.6 km^{2} (2.9 sq mi)

Population (2021)
  - Total: 880
  - Density: 120/km^{2} (300/sq mi)
- Time zone: UTC+1 (CET)
  - Summer (DST): UTC+2 (CEST)

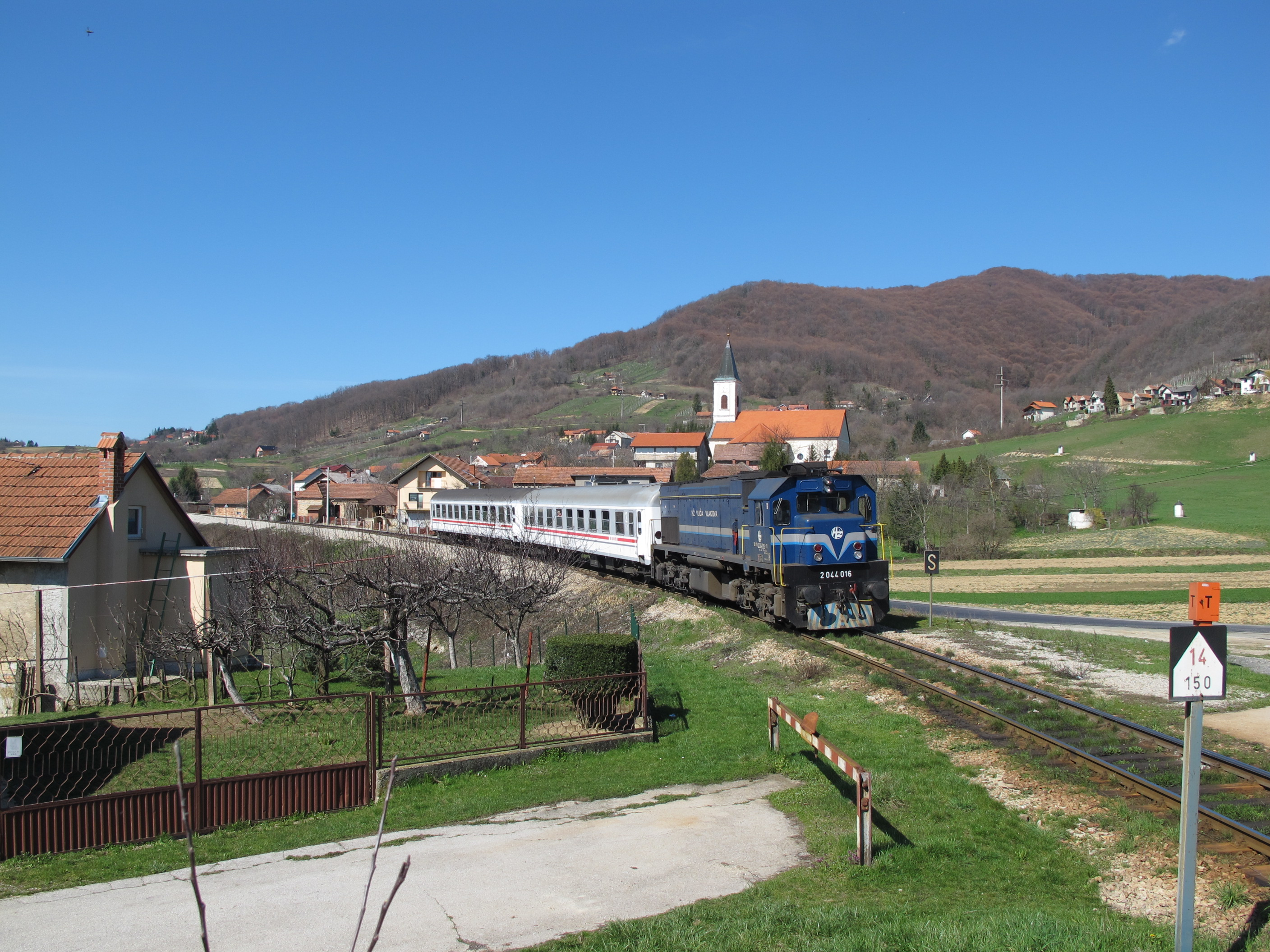

Madžarevo is a village in Varaždin County, northern Croatia. It is connected by the D24 highway and R201 railway.
