= Grešćevina =

Coordinates: 46°13′34″N 16°28′23″E

- Village
- Interactive map of Grešćevina
- Country: Croatia
- County: Varaždin County
- City: Varaždinske Toplice

Area
  - Total: 1.6 km^{2} (0.62 sq mi)

Population (2021)
  - Total: 127
  - Density: 79/km^{2} (210/sq mi)
- Time zone: UTC+1 (CET)
  - Summer (DST): UTC+2 (CEST)

Grešćevina is a village in Croatia. It is connected by the D2 highway.
