= Petkovec Toplički =

Coordinates: 46°11′24″N 16°23′38″E

- Village
- Interactive map of Petkovec Toplički
- Country: Croatia
- County: Varaždin County

Area
  - Total: 3.1 km^{2} (1.2 sq mi)

Population (2021)
  - Total: 248
  - Density: 80/km^{2} (210/sq mi)
- Time zone: UTC+1 (CET)
  - Summer (DST): UTC+2 (CEST)

Petkovec Toplički is a village in Croatia.
