= Kapela Kalnička =

- Village
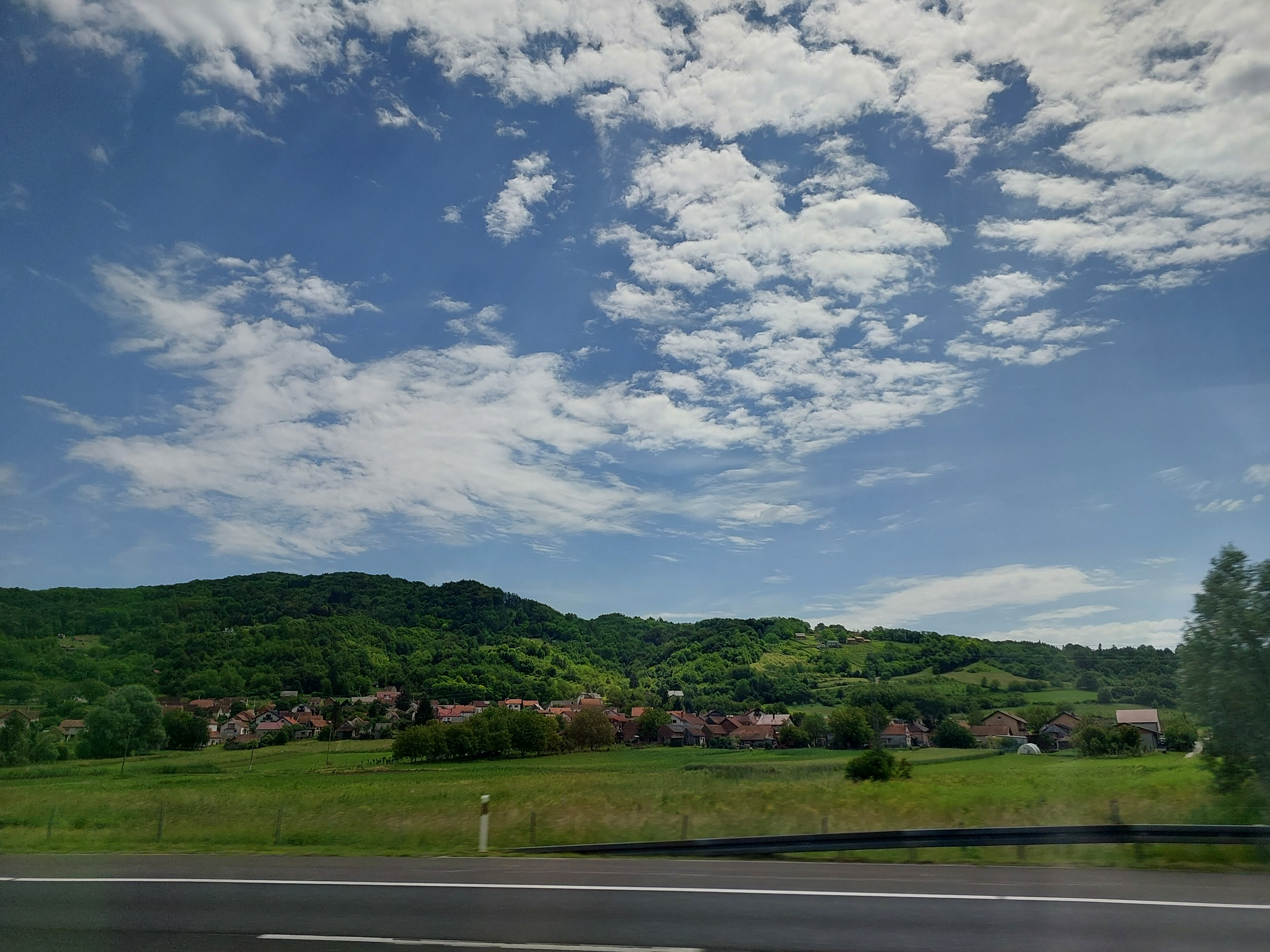
- Interactive map of Kapela Kalnička
- Coordinates: 46°11′N 16°24′E
- Country: Croatia
- County: Varaždin County

Area
  - Total: 1.9 km^{2} (0.73 sq mi)

Population (2021)
  - Total: 217
  - Density: 110/km^{2} (300/sq mi)
- Time zone: UTC+1 (CET)
  - Summer (DST): UTC+2 (CEST)

Kapela Kalnička is a village in Croatia. It is connected by the D24 highway.

== Notable People ==
Famous people Stjepan Krizin Sakač, Jesuit, Croatian historian, originator of the theory of the Iranian origin of Croats; originator of the idea of the Brotherhood of St. Jerome for the assistance of Croatian refugees.
