= Donja Batina =

Donja Batina may refer to:

- Donja Batina, Zlatar, a village near Zlatar, Krapina-Zagorje County, Croatia
- Donja Batina, Konjščina, a village near Konjščina, Krapina-Zagorje County, Croatia
