= Slavko Stolnik =

Croatian naïve painter and sculptor

Slavko Stolnik (11 June 1929 – 17 May 1991) was a Croatian naive painter and sculptor.

== Life ==
Stolnik was born in the village of Donja Voća near Varaždin. Interested in painting since childhood, but born in poor peasant family, he did not have funds for education. Employed, first as a miner, then went to serve in the militia in Zagreb.

== Hegedušić influence ==
In Croatian capital, soon he meets art pedagogue Krsto Hegedušić who noticed his talent for painting, and teaches him painting on glass. After the great success, was considered almost a sensation in the art world, Stolnik went to Paris to conquer the world. Uneducated peasant, unaccustomed to the cruelty of the big city, ended up as a Tramp under the Seine bridges. In 1963 returns to Zagreb and then to his birthplace where he is inspired by the local images of everyday life. In third, and most fruitful phase of his painting, between 1970 and 1976 he created most important works. Apart from painting, he has sculptor and skilful in folk medicine, which is why in late 80's, people throughout Yugoslavia visited him seeking remedy for recovery. His first solo exhibition was in Zagreb in 1955.

== Exhibitions ==
He has exhibited in numerous solo and group exhibitions at: Zagreb, Rijeka, Dubrovnik, Beograd, Lausanne, Paris, Zlatar, Varaždin, Frankfurt, Milano, Duisburg, Torino Asti, Eisenstadt. His works can be found at the Croatian Museum of Naïve Art in Zagreb.

== Death ==
During the night between 16 and 17 May 1991 year, in his home in Stolnik hamlet of Donja Voća, was killed by two robbers. In 1996, 80 paintings were stolen from his estate and were never recovered. His shocking final chapter is featured in Episode 5 on Dosje Jaraktrue crime documentary.
