= Oštrice =

Coordinates: 46°11′N 16°21′E

- Village
- Interactive map of Oštrice
- Country: Croatia
- County: Varaždin County

Area
  - Total: 3.5 km^{2} (1.4 sq mi)

Population (2021)
  - Total: 420
  - Density: 120/km^{2} (310/sq mi)
- Time zone: UTC+1 (CET)
  - Summer (DST): UTC+2 (CEST)

Oštrice is a village in northern Croatia's Varaždin County.
