= Leskovec Toplički =

Coordinates: 46°13′N 16°31′E

- Village
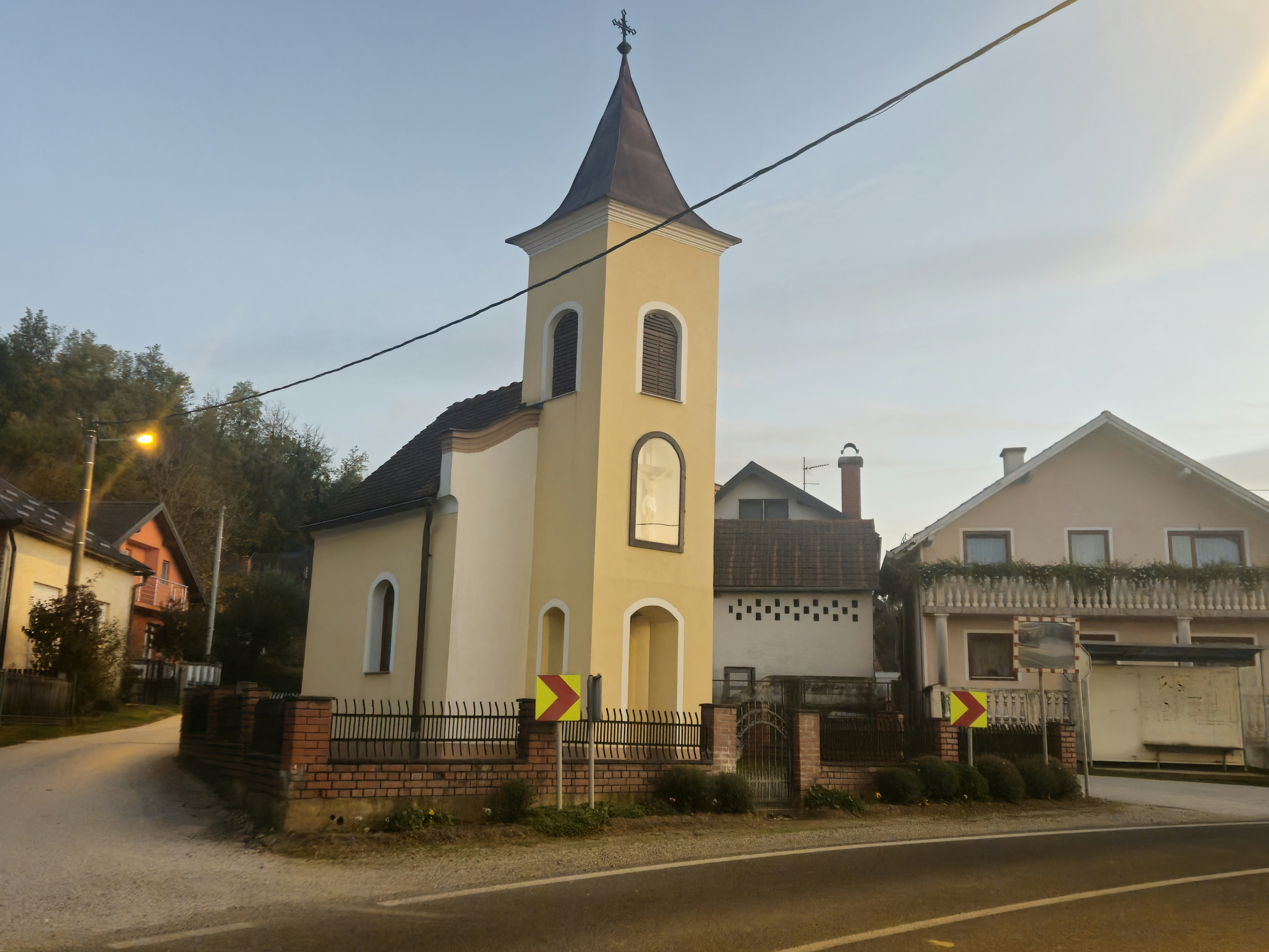
- Interactive map of Leskovec Toplički
- Country: Croatia
- County: Varaždin County

Area
  - Total: 12.8 km^{2} (4.9 sq mi)

Population (2021)
  - Total: 432
  - Density: 33.8/km^{2} (87.4/sq mi)
- Time zone: UTC+1 (CET)
  - Summer (DST): UTC+2 (CEST)

Leskovec Toplički is a village in Croatia. It is connected by the D24 highway.
