= Visoko, Croatia =

Visoko
- Municipality
- Visoko
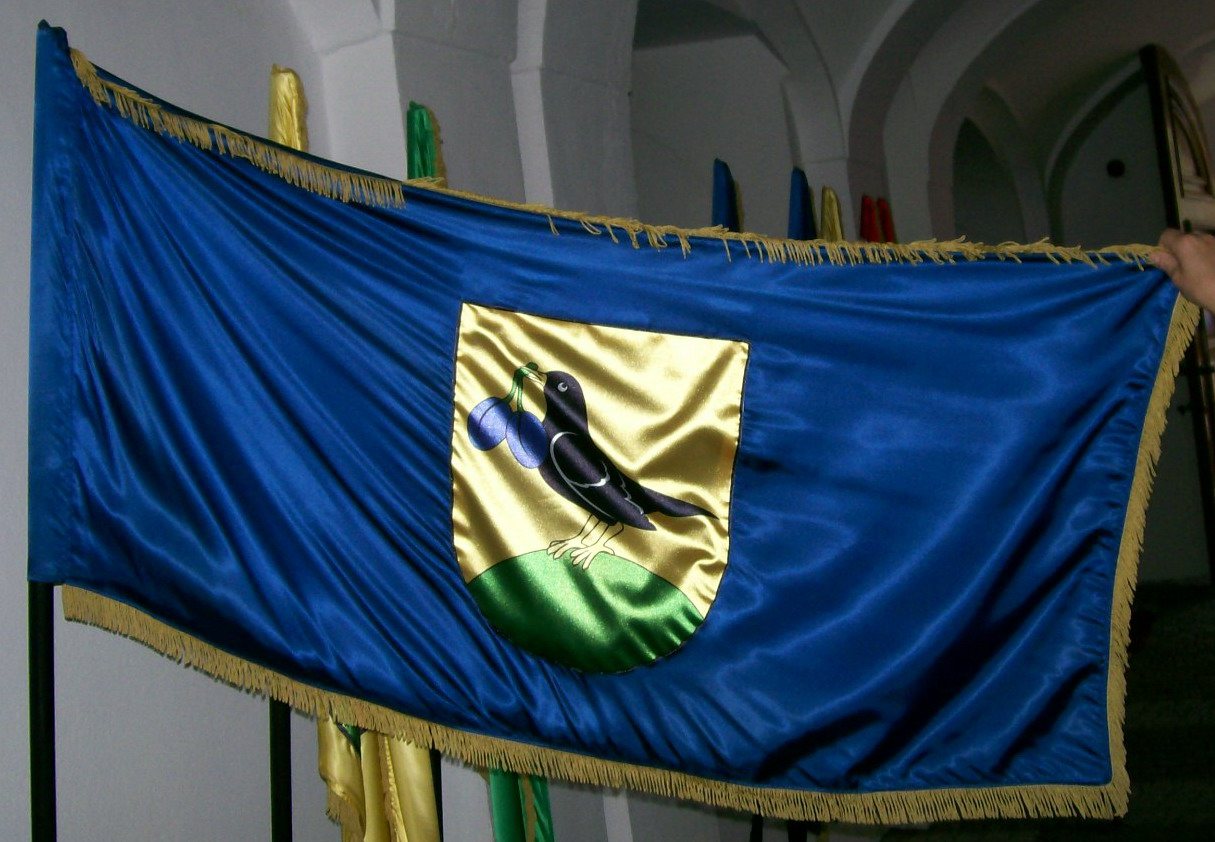
- Flag

- Location within Croatia
- Coordinates: 46°09′N 16°33′E
- Country: Croatia
- County: Varaždin County

Area
  - Municipality: 24.8 km^{2} (9.6 sq mi)
  - Urban: 8.3 km^{2} (3.2 sq mi)

Population (2021)
  - Municipality: 1,335
  - Density: 53.8/km^{2} (139/sq mi)
  - Urban: 454
  - Urban density: 55/km^{2} (140/sq mi)
- Time zone: UTC+1 (CET)
  - Summer (DST): UTC+2 (CEST)
- Website: visoko.hr

Visoko is a village and municipality in Croatia in Varaždin County. In the 2011 census, the total population of the municipality was 1,518, in the following settlements:

- Čanjevo, population 184
- Đurinovec, population 135
- Kračevec, population 135
- Presečno Visočko, population 180
- Vinično, population 277
- Visoko, population 493
- Vrh Visočki, population 114

In the 2011 census, an absolute majority of the population were Croats.
