= Veliki Bukovec, Varaždin County =

Veliki Bukovec
- Municipality
- Interactive map of Veliki Bukovec
- Location of Mali Bukovec in Croatia
- Coordinates: 46°18′N 16°43′E
- Country: Croatia
- County: Varaždin County

Government
  - Municipal mayor: Zvonko Hlebar

Area
  - Municipality: 23.2 km^{2} (9.0 sq mi)
  - Urban: 11.7 km^{2} (4.5 sq mi)

Population (2021)
  - Municipality: 1,325
  - Density: 57.1/km^{2} (148/sq mi)
  - Urban: 660
  - Urban density: 56/km^{2} (150/sq mi)
- Time zone: UTC+1 (CET)
  - Summer (DST): UTC+2 (CEST)
- Postal code: 42231 Mali Bukovec
- Area code: +385 (0)42 840
- Website: velikibukovec.hr

Veliki Bukovec is a village and municipality in Croatia in Varaždin County.

In the 2011 census, there were a total of 1,438 inhabitants, in the following settlements:

- Dubovica, population 312
- Kapela Podravska, population 466
- Veliki Bukovec, population 660

In the same census, an overwhelming majority of the population were Croats.
