= Drenovec =

Coordinates: 46°11′N 16°29′E

- Village
- Interactive map of Drenovec
- Country: Croatia
- County: Varaždin County

Area
  - Total: 12.9 km^{2} (5.0 sq mi)

Population (2021)
  - Total: 299
  - Density: 23.2/km^{2} (60.0/sq mi)
- Time zone: UTC+1 (CET)
  - Summer (DST): UTC+2 (CEST)

Drenovec is a village in Croatia.
