= Tuhovec =

Coordinates: 46°12′N 16°27′E

- Village
- Interactive map of Tuhovec
- Country: Croatia
- County: Varaždin County

Area
  - Total: 2.4 km^{2} (0.93 sq mi)

Population (2021)
  - Total: 577
  - Density: 240/km^{2} (620/sq mi)
- Time zone: UTC+1 (CET)
  - Summer (DST): UTC+2 (CEST)

Tuhovec is located in Varaždin, Croatia. It is connected by the D2 highway. Its main road (simply named, Tuhovec) is approximately 2.39 km (1.8 miles) long
