= Galovec =

Coordinates: 46°04′23″N 16°11′24″E

- Village
- Interactive map of Galovec
- Country: Croatia
- County: Krapina-Zagorje County

Area
  - Total: 1.1 km^{2} (0.42 sq mi)

Population (2021)
  - Total: 117
  - Density: 110/km^{2} (280/sq mi)
- Time zone: UTC+1 (CET)
  - Summer (DST): UTC+2 (CEST)

Galovec is a village in Croatia. It is connected by the D24 highway.
