= Krapina Selo =

Coordinates: 46°04′52″N 16°11′46″E

- Village
- Interactive map of Krapina Selo
- Country: Croatia
- County: Krapina-Zagorje County

Area
  - Total: 2.1 km^{2} (0.81 sq mi)

Population (2021)
  - Total: 118
  - Density: 56/km^{2} (150/sq mi)
- Time zone: UTC+1 (CET)
  - Summer (DST): UTC+2 (CEST)

Krapina Selo is a village in Croatia. It is connected by the D24 highway. The name means "Village of Krapina".
