= Gornja Batina =

- Village
- Location within Croatia
- Coordinates: 46°7′12″N 16°6′47″E
- Country: Croatia
- County: Krapina-Zagorje County
- Municipality: Zlatar

Area
  - Total: 2.2 km^{2} (0.85 sq mi)

Population (2021)
  - Total: 207
  - Density: 94/km^{2} (240/sq mi)
- Time zone: UTC+1 (CET)
  - Summer (DST): UTC+2 (CEST)

Gornja Batina is a village in Croatia.
