= Aquae Iasae =

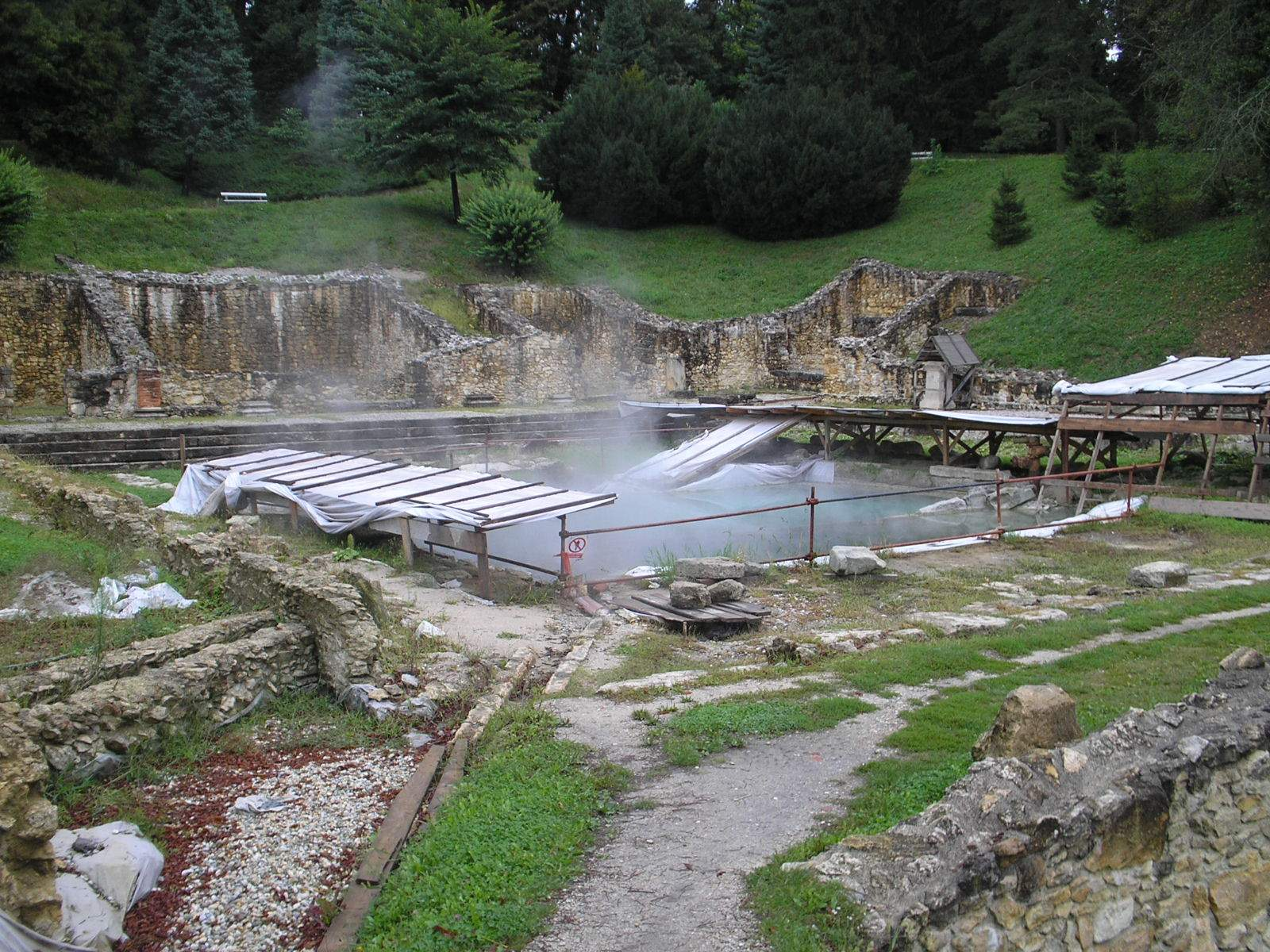
- Interactive map of Aquae Iasae
- Location: Varaždinske Toplice, Croatia
- Coordinates: 46.2080°N 16.4213°E
- Type: Thermae
- Beginning date: 1st century
- Completion date: 4th century

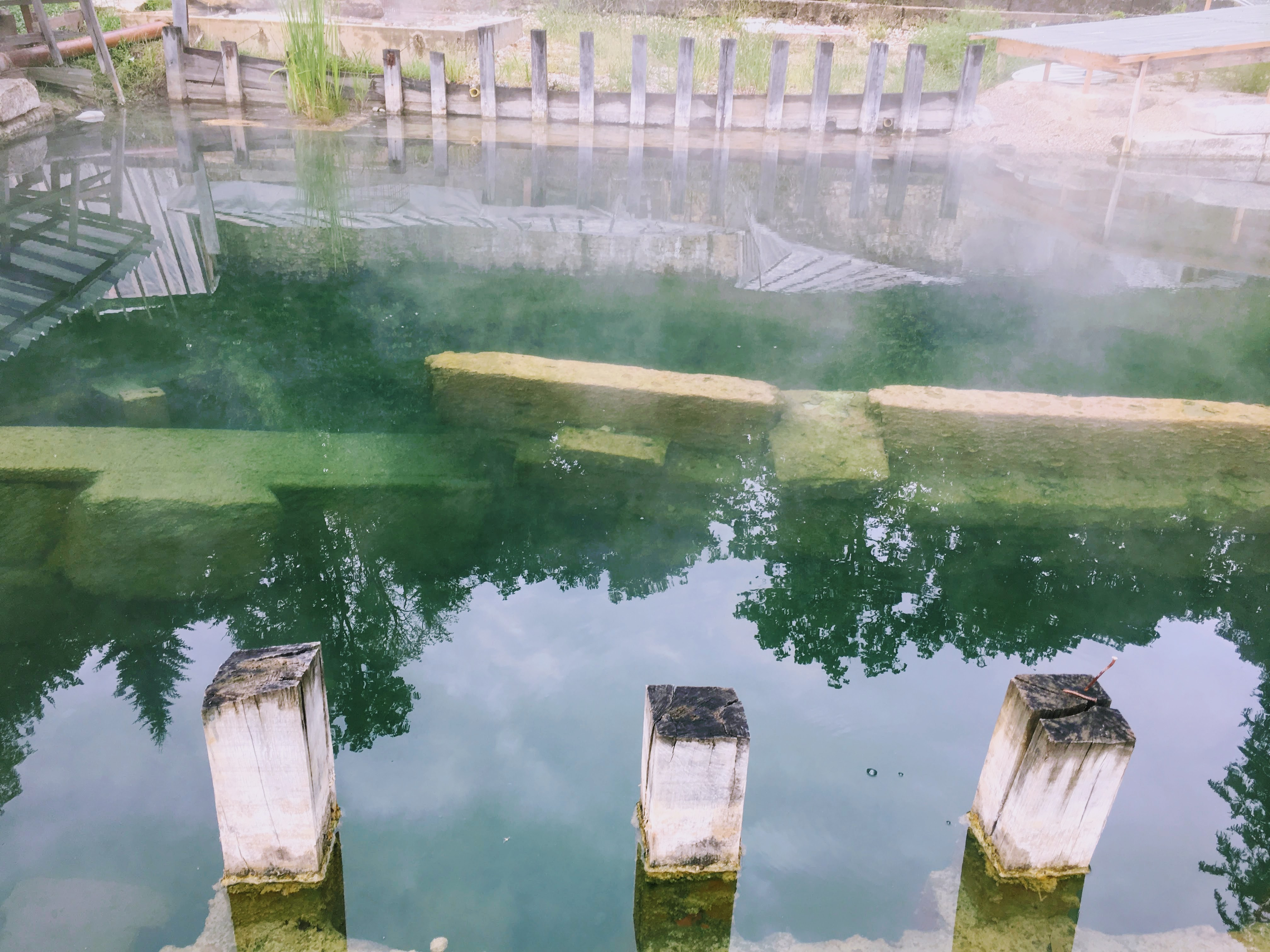
Warm water in the pool

Aquae Iasae was the Roman settlement and Roman bath in the area of present city Varaždinske Toplice, Croatia. Today it is the name of the archaeological site.

== History ==
In the 3rd century BC, in this area lived the Illyrian tribe Jasi, whose name the Romans referred to later in calling this place Aquae Iasae, "Waters of the Jasi". The village Jasa, thanks to its springs of water, grew into a significant medical, ceremonial, cultural and economic center of Pannonia Superior.

The biggest boom was seen under the Roman Empire from the 1st to the 4th centuries. The public part of the Roman settlement was located on the highest terrace of the hill Varaždin spa, today the park and archaeological site. The residential part of Aquae Iasae was on the terraces that descend to the foot of the hill in the foothills of the craft-established commercial and trade show facilities.

At the end of 3rd century AD Aquae Iasae were ravaged during the incursion of the Goths, then, in the beginning of the 4th century, the thermae were restored by Emperor Constantine. The resort was completely ruined and deserted in the 4th century during the invasions of the Migration period.

== Archaeological excavation ==
Intensive archaeological excavation and research have continued since 1953, under the Department of Ancient Archaeological Museum in Zagreb, led by professor Marcel Gorenc. Then in the spa park, discovered complex of Roman architecture from the 1st - 4th century CE, in area of 6000 m^{2}.

This circuit consisted of spa parts, which make up the building with swimming pools and the basilica, the Forum with porches located around the main thermal sources, and Capitol with the temples of Jupiter, Juno and Minerva. The excavations at the site uncovered numerous remains: parts of swords, shields, knives, razors, imperial coins (which were thrown into the pool for good luck), many statues of nymphs (nymfus salutaris, the goddess of healing) and the well preserved marble pavement of the 2nd century.

The most valuable finding is the statue of the goddess Minerva with a pedestal, was found in 1967 at the entrance to the temple. Minerva wears a legionary helmet, wields a copper spear and shield, and instead of hair has snakes (the pharmacy). This statue was built in the 2nd century in Poetovio, and had him make a councilor as a votive gift of healing.

More recent research in the Forum has discovered the ancient spring-fed Roman pool. This pool has the dimensions of 8x13.5 meters and the depth is 2.6 meters. The natural source of the baths' thermal water, was fenced in by large stone blocks. So far, the only similar example of such a pool is known in the Roman settlement of Aquae Sulis in England.

Specific conditions of soil around the springs of water, and travertine deposits, have given rise to good preservation of Roman architecture, so that this complex is one of the best preserved Roman sites in Croatia.

== See also ==
- List of Roman public baths
