= Gornja Poljana =

Coordinates: 46°13′N 16°29′E

- Village
- Interactive map of Gornja Poljana
- Country: Croatia
- County: Varaždin County

Area
  - Total: 2.4 km^{2} (0.93 sq mi)

Population (2021)
  - Total: 218
  - Density: 91/km^{2} (240/sq mi)
- Time zone: UTC+1 (CET)
  - Summer (DST): UTC+2 (CEST)

Gornja Poljana is a village in Croatia.
