= Ljubešćica =

- Location within Croatia
- Coordinates: 46°10′N 16°23′E
- Country: Croatia
- County: Varaždin County

Area
  - Total: 35.3 km^{2} (13.6 sq mi)

Population (2021)
  - Total: 1,689
  - Density: 47.8/km^{2} (124/sq mi)
- Time zone: UTC+1 (CET)
  - Summer (DST): UTC+2 (CEST)
- Website: ljubescica.hr

Ljubeščica is a village and municipality in Croatia in Varaždin County.

== Population ==
In the 2011 census, there were a total of 1,858 inhabitants, in the following settlements:

- Kapela Kalnička, population 268
- Ljubelj, population 63
- Ljubelj Kalnički, population 144
- Ljubešćica, population 1,261
- Rakovec, population 122

In the same census, 99% of the people were Croats.

== Notable person ==
- Luka Ivanušec – footballer
