= Jelovec, Krapina-Zagorje County =

Coordinates: 46°03′N 16°11′E

Jelovec
- Village
- Interactive map of Jelovec
- Country: Croatia

Area
  - Total: 0.39 sq mi (1.0 km^{2})

Population (2021)
  - Total: 135
  - Density: 350/sq mi (140/km^{2})
- Time zone: UTC+1 (CET)
  - Summer (DST): UTC+2 (CEST)

Jelovec is a village in Croatia. It is connected by the D24 highway.
