= Donja Voća =

- Municipality
- Interactive map of Donja Voća
- Location within Croatia
- Coordinates: 46.30°N 16.11°E
- Country: Croatia
- County: Varaždin County

Government
  - Municipal mayor: Sanja Kočet (Independent)

Area
  - Municipality: 36.0 km^{2} (13.9 sq mi)
  - Urban: 9.7 km^{2} (3.7 sq mi)

Population (2021)
  - Municipality: 2,030
  - Density: 56.4/km^{2} (146/sq mi)
  - Urban: 958
  - Urban density: 99/km^{2} (260/sq mi)
- Time zone: UTC+1 (CET)
  - Summer (DST): UTC+2 (CEST)
- Website: voca.hr

Donja Voća is a municipality in Croatia in Varaždin County. According to the 2021 census, the municipality has 2,030 inhabitants.

== Demographics ==
In the 2021 census, the municipality had a population of 2,030 in the following settlements:

- Budinščak, population 97
- Donja Voća, population 958
- Fotez Breg, population 60
- Gornja Voća, population 421
- Jelovec Voćanski, population 59
- Plitvica Voćanska, population 61
- Rijeka Voćanska, population 189
- Slivarsko, population 185
Donja Voća: Population trends 1857–2021
v

population	2951	2989	3246	3794	4065	4630	5057	5183	5746	5686	5132	4475	3734	3091	2844	2443	2030
	1857	1869	1880	1890	1900	1910	1921	1931	1948	1953	1961	1971	1981	1991	2001	2011	2021

Sources: Croatian Bureau of Statistics publications

== Administration ==
The current municipal mayor of Donja Voća is Sanja Kočet and the Donja Voća Municipal Council consists of 9 seats.

Groups	Councilors per group
Grouping of electors	7 / 9
HDZ	2 / 9

== Culture ==
There are currently 11 associations operating in the Municipality of Donja Voća:

- Mentor Association
- VFD Donja Voća
- FC “Vindija“ Donja Voća
- Association for the preservation of old customs of the Voća region "Stara brv" Gornja Voća
- Sunbeam Association
- Association of Pensioners and Elderly People Voća
- Cultural and artistic society Voća
- "Voćanski pinklec" Association Donja Voća
- Hunting club "Trčka" Donja Voća
- Hunting Association "Srnjak" Gornja Voća
- Association of winegrowers and fruit growers "Barilček" Donja Voća

== Education ==
There are three educational institutions in the municipality:

- A. K. Miošić Elementary School
- Antun Gustav Matoš Regional School
- Student Cooperative "Hižica"

== Notable people ==
- Slavko Stolnik, Croatian painter and sculptor
