= Varaždin County =

County in northern Croatia

Coordinates: 46.321°N 16.231°E

Varaždin County Varaždinska županija (Croatian)
- County
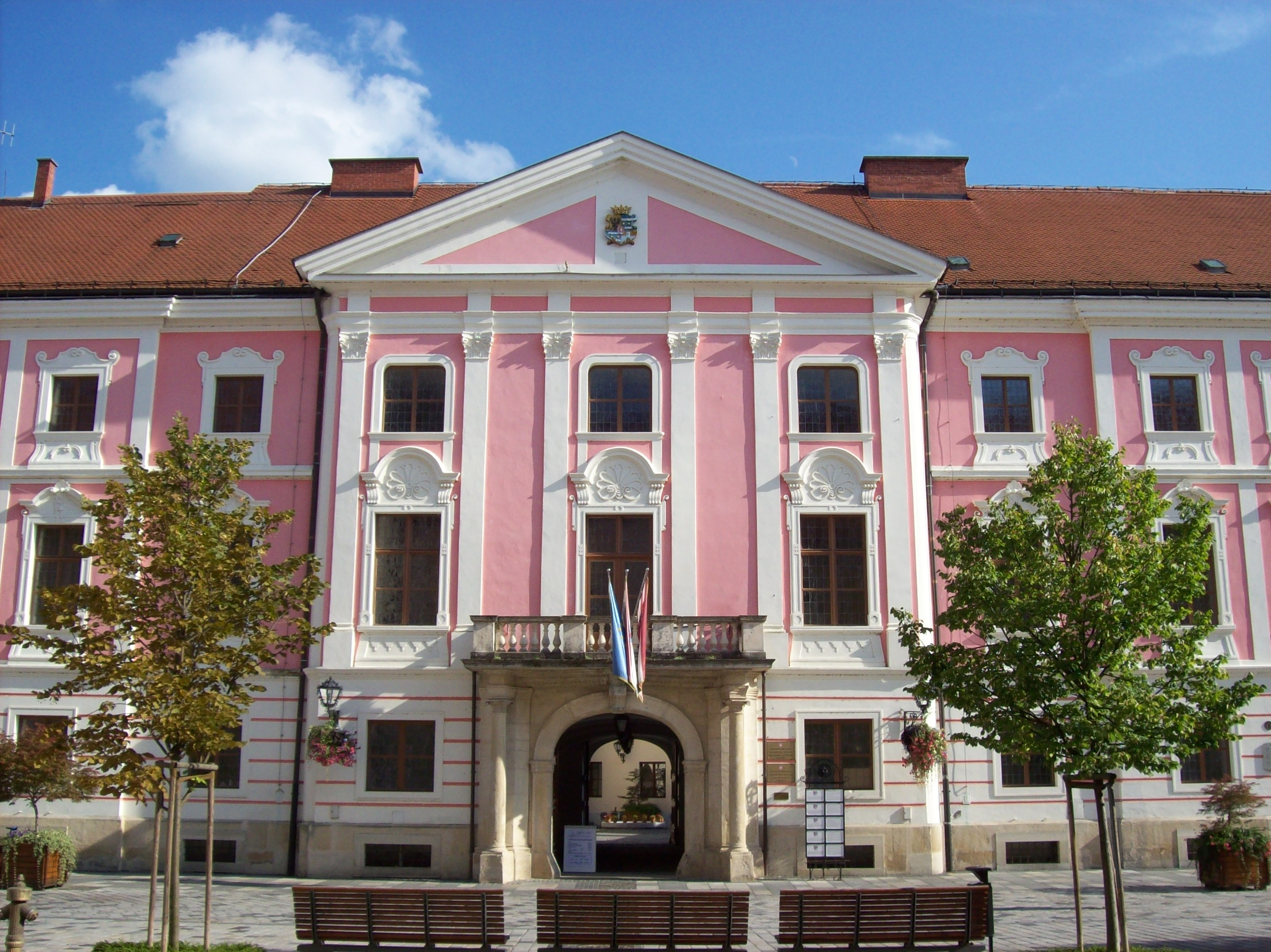
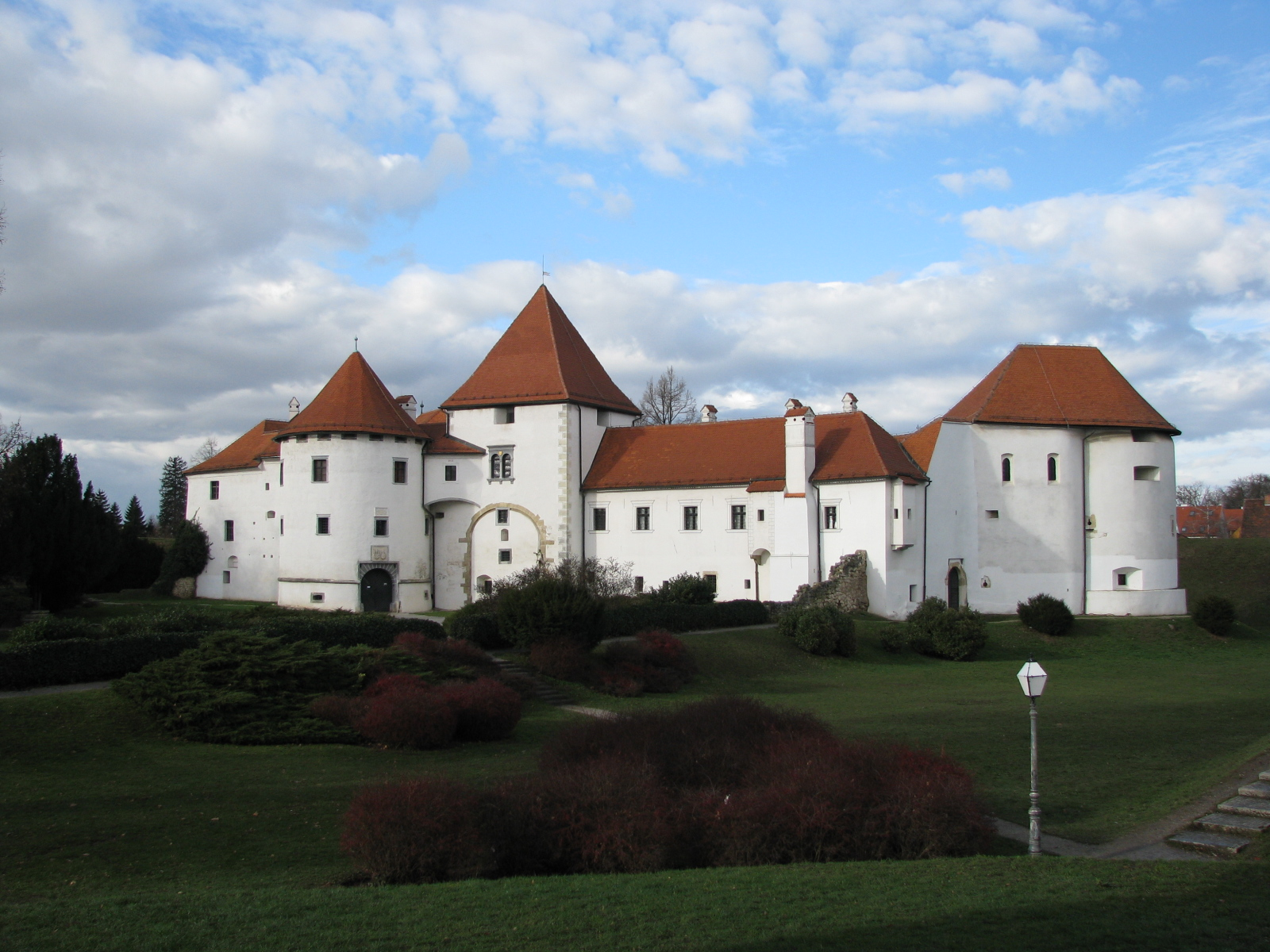
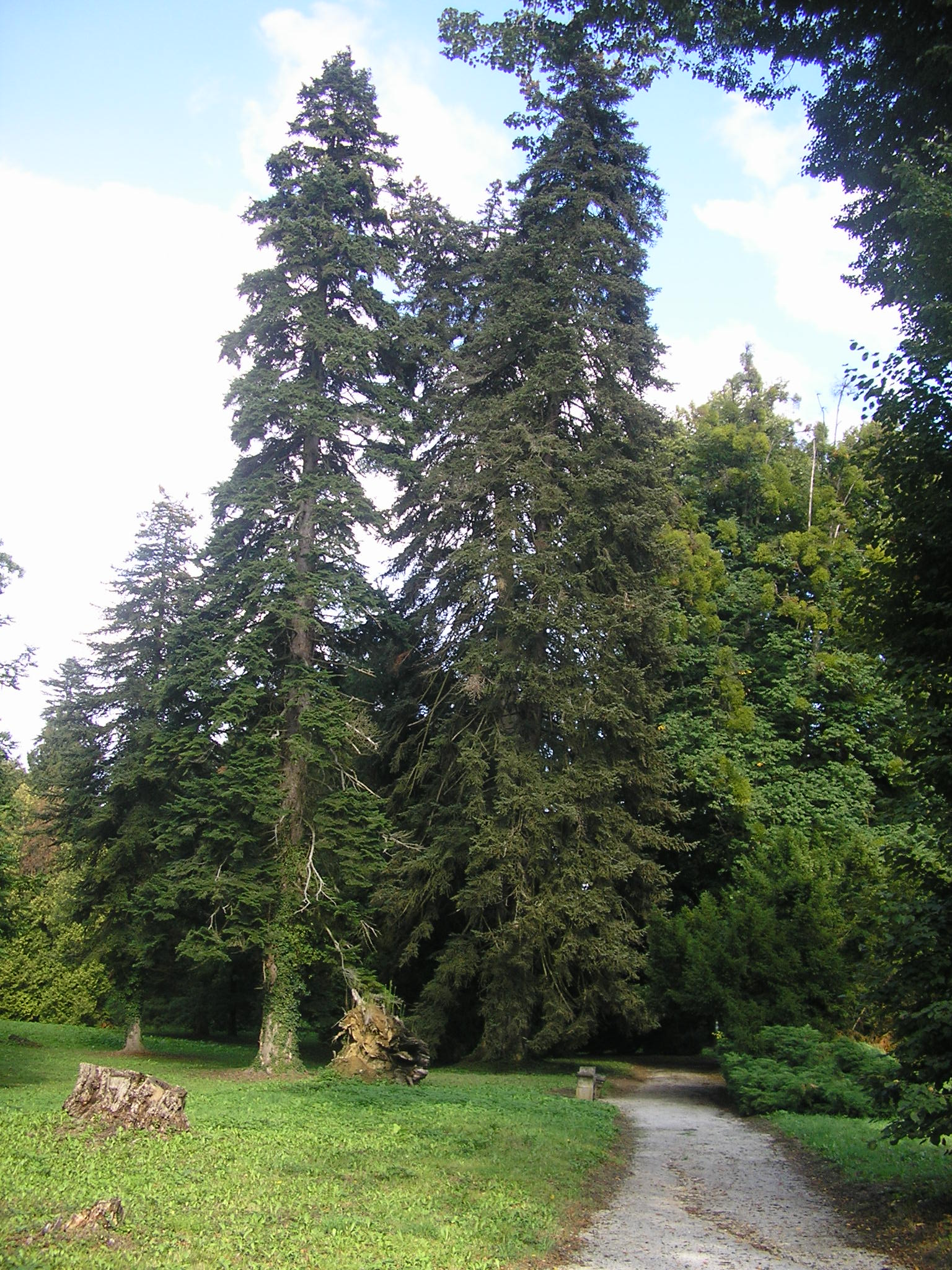
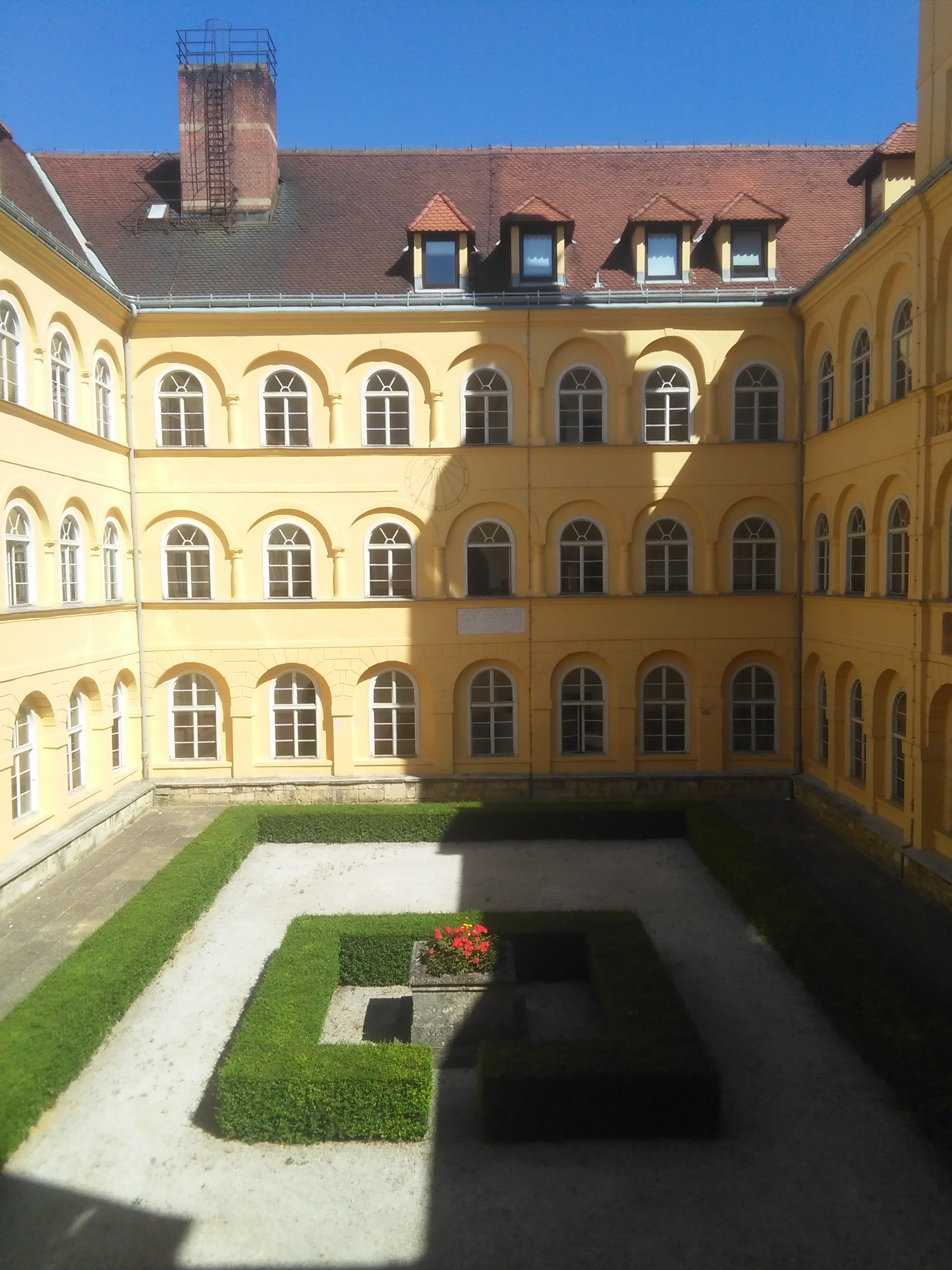
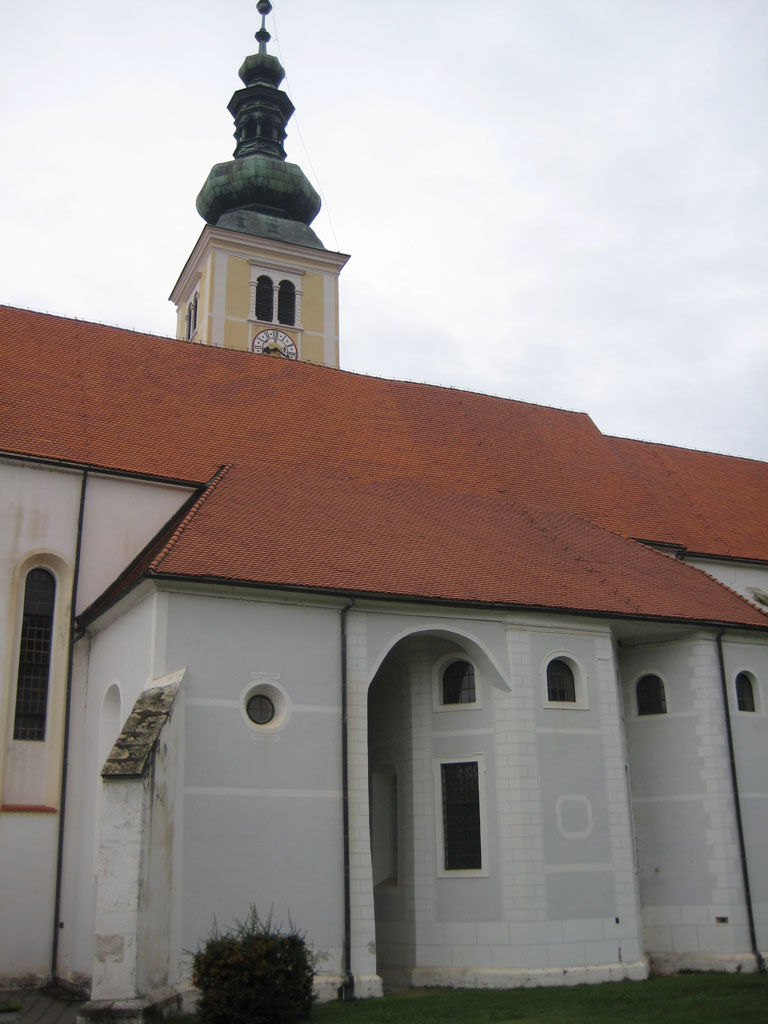
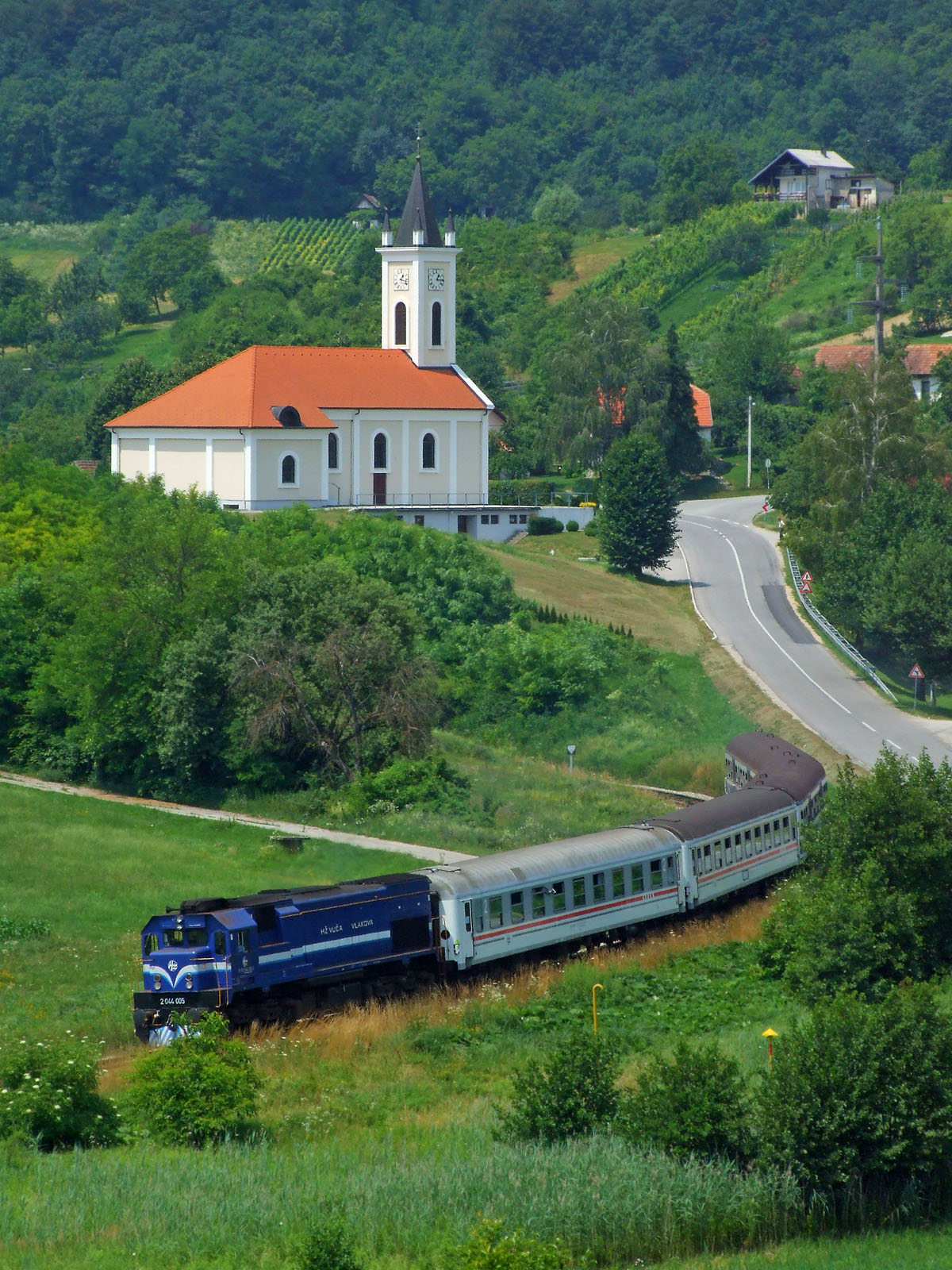
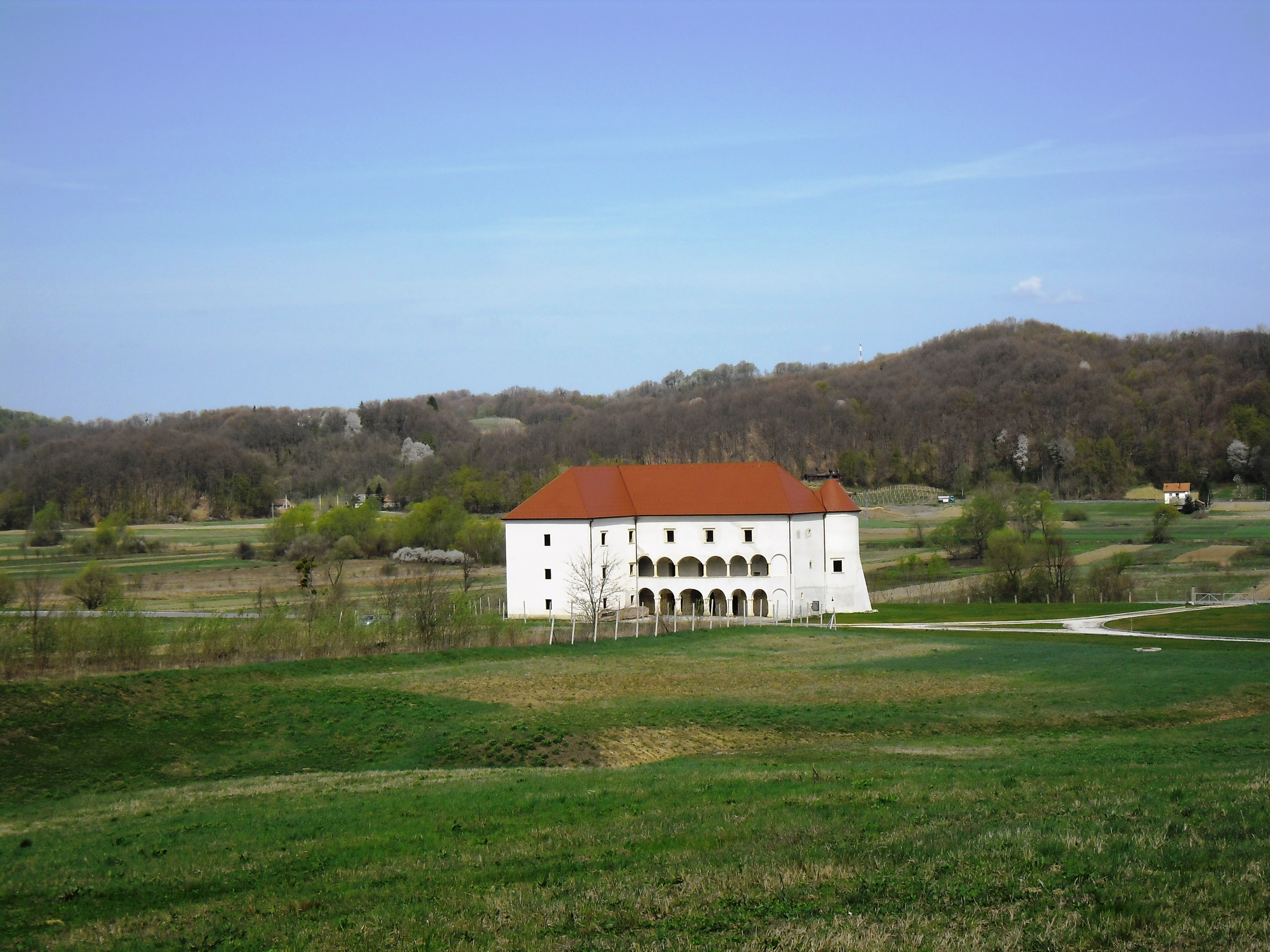
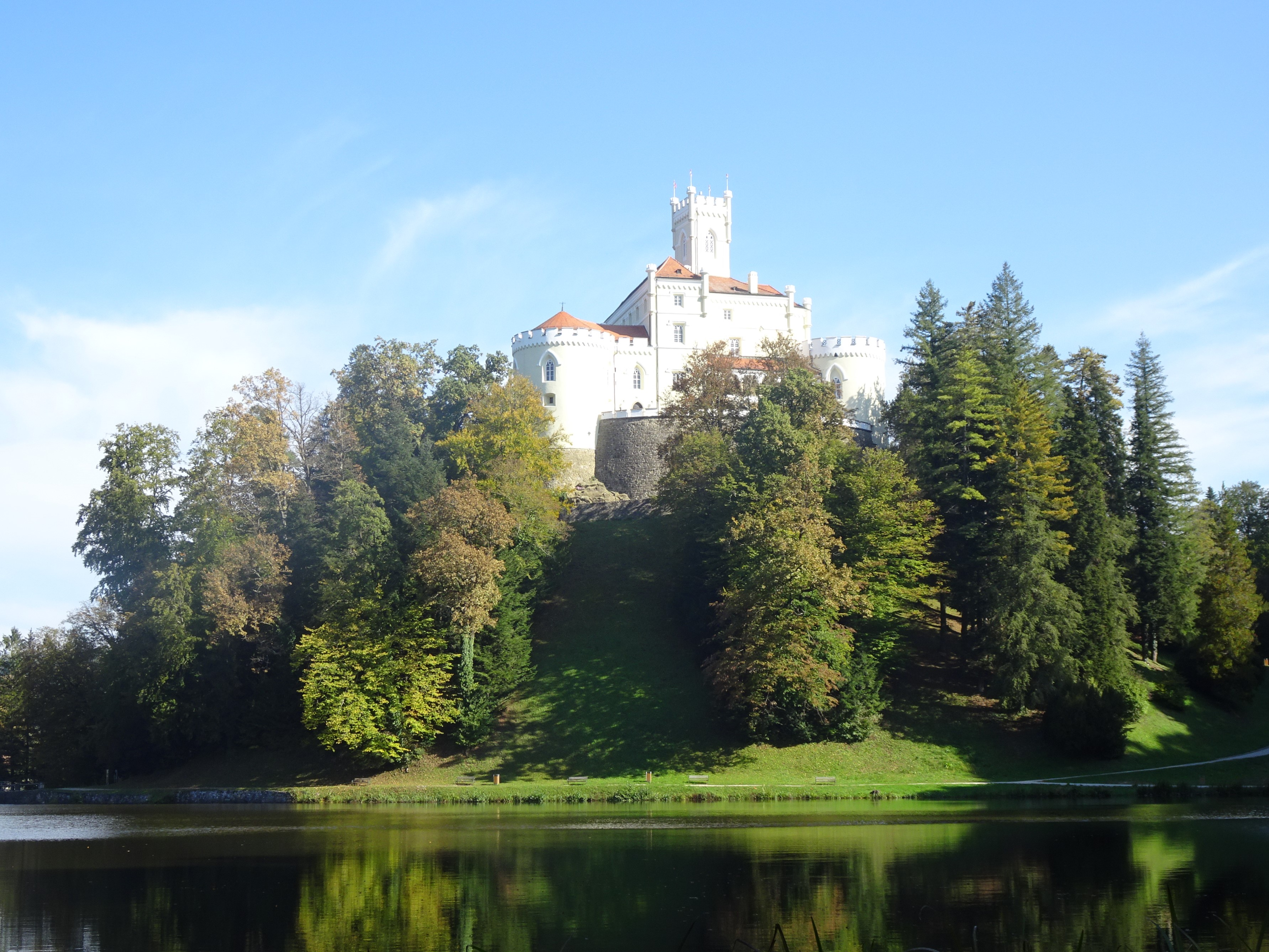
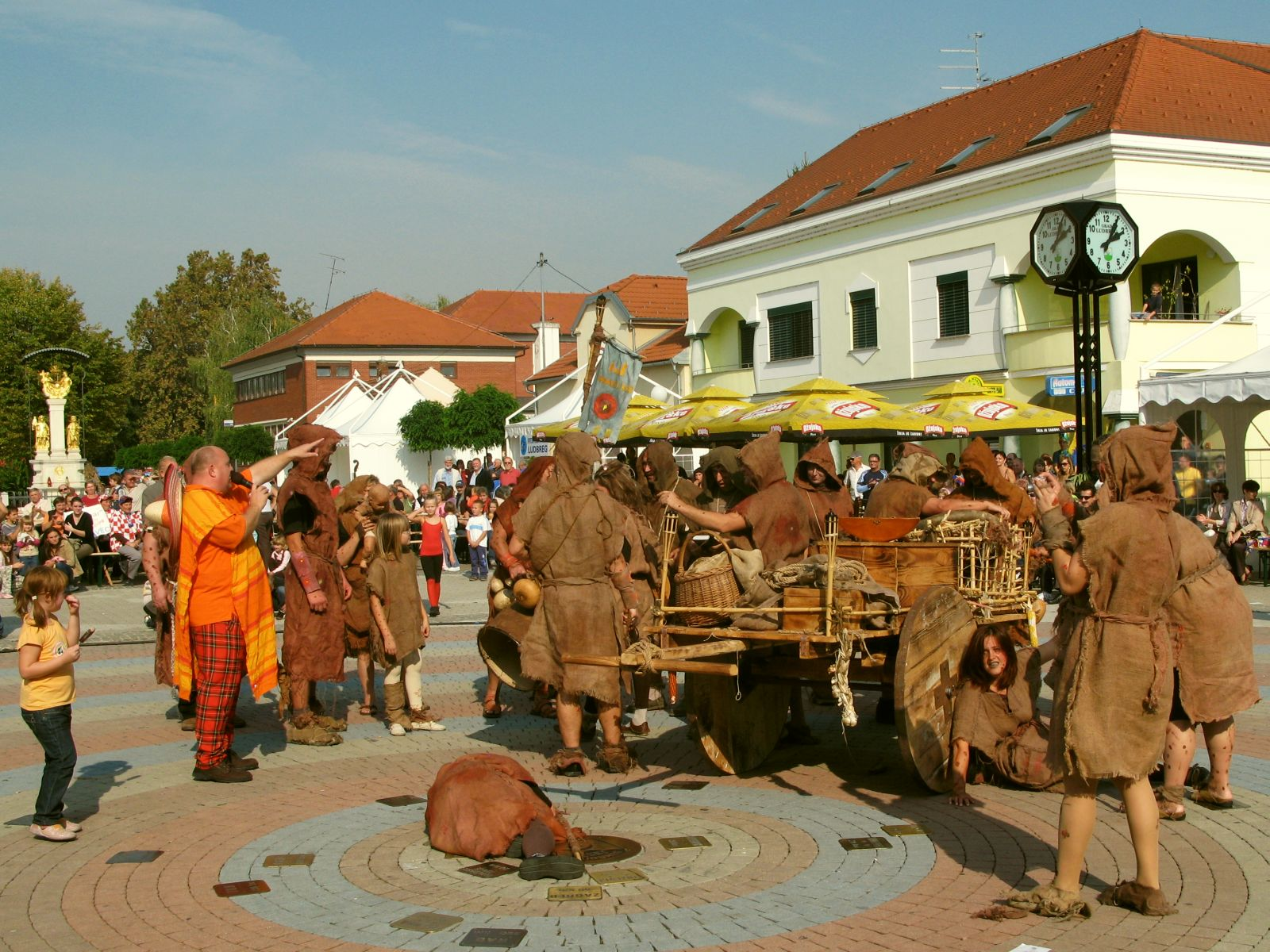
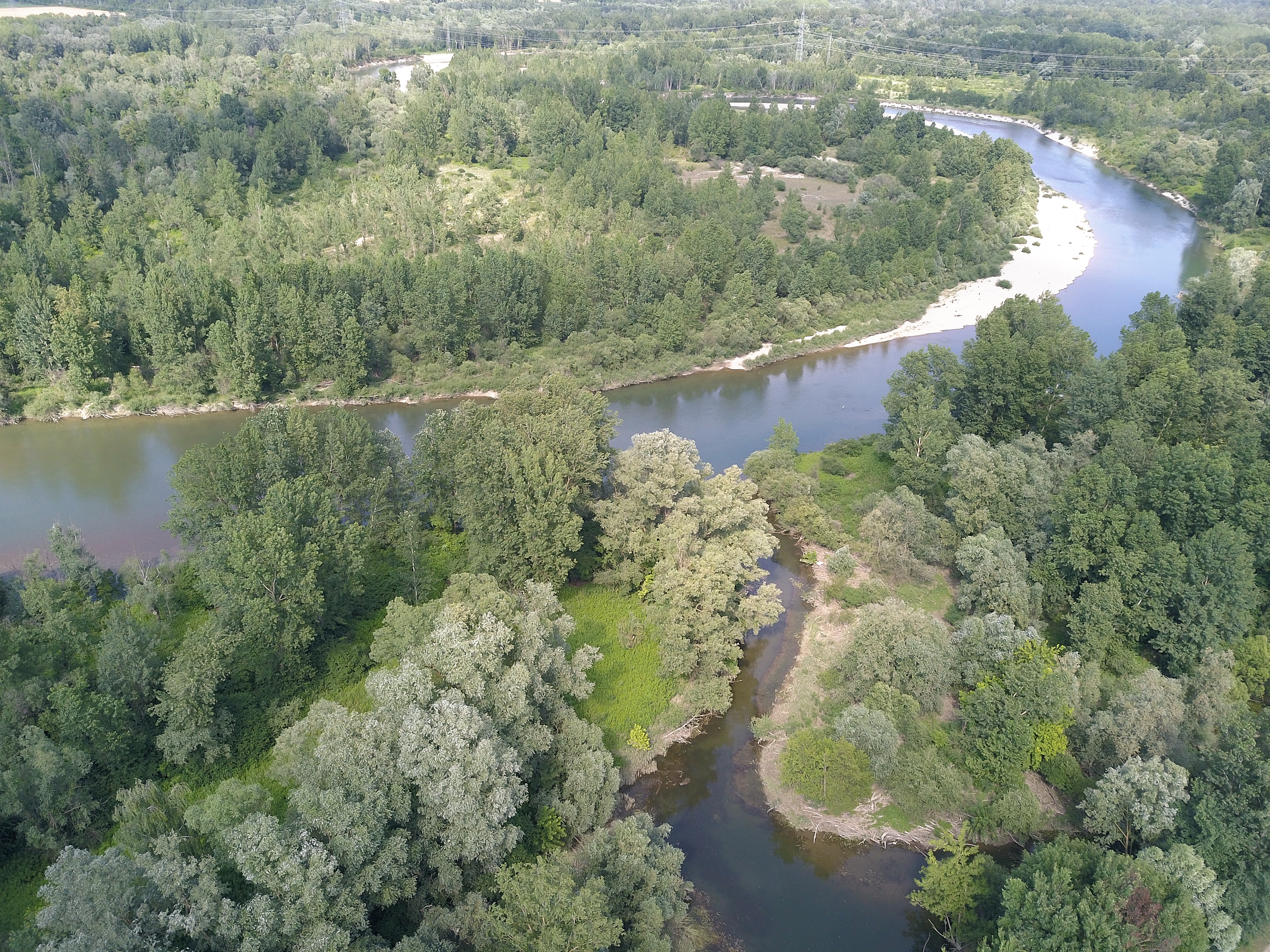
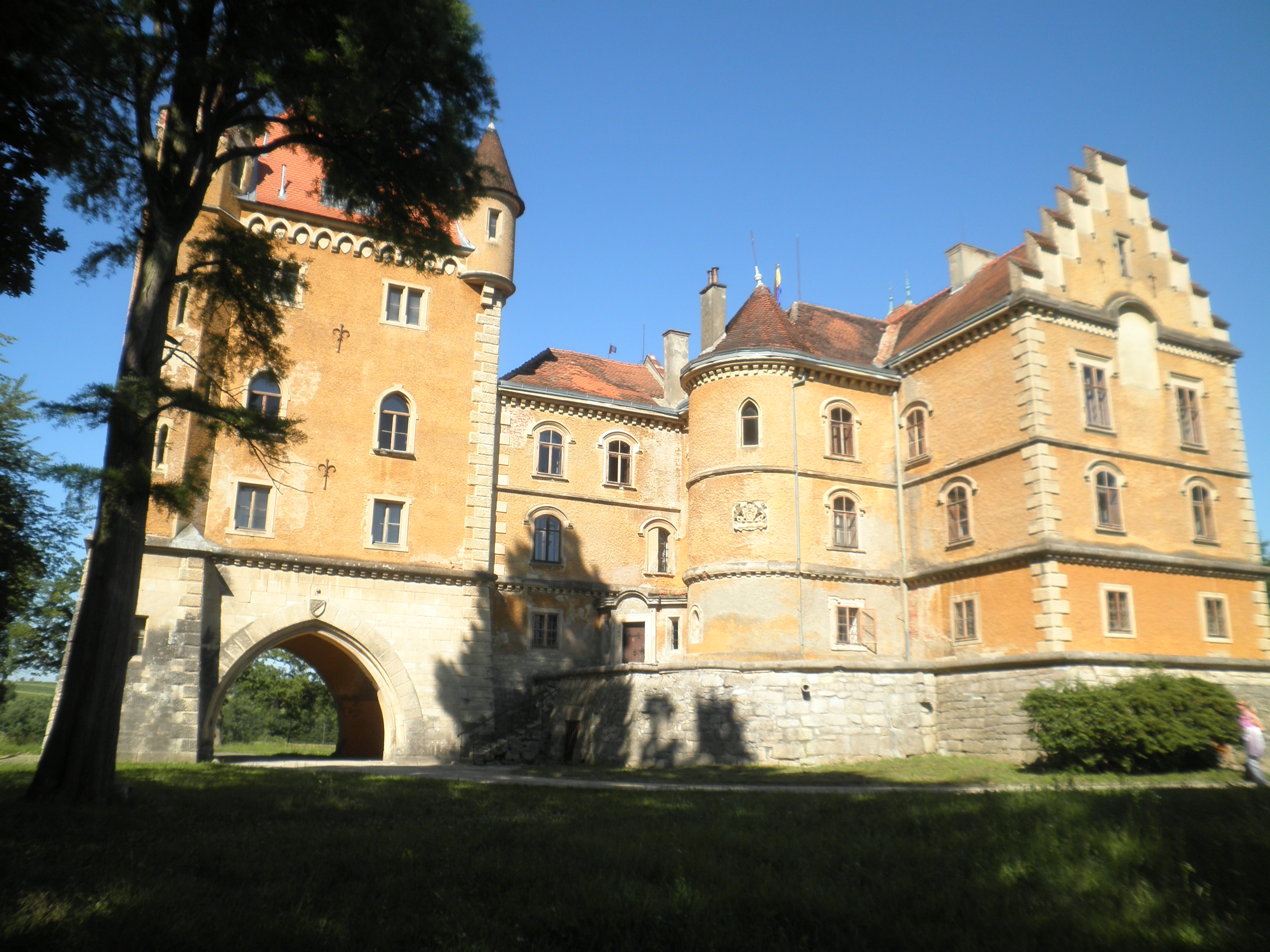
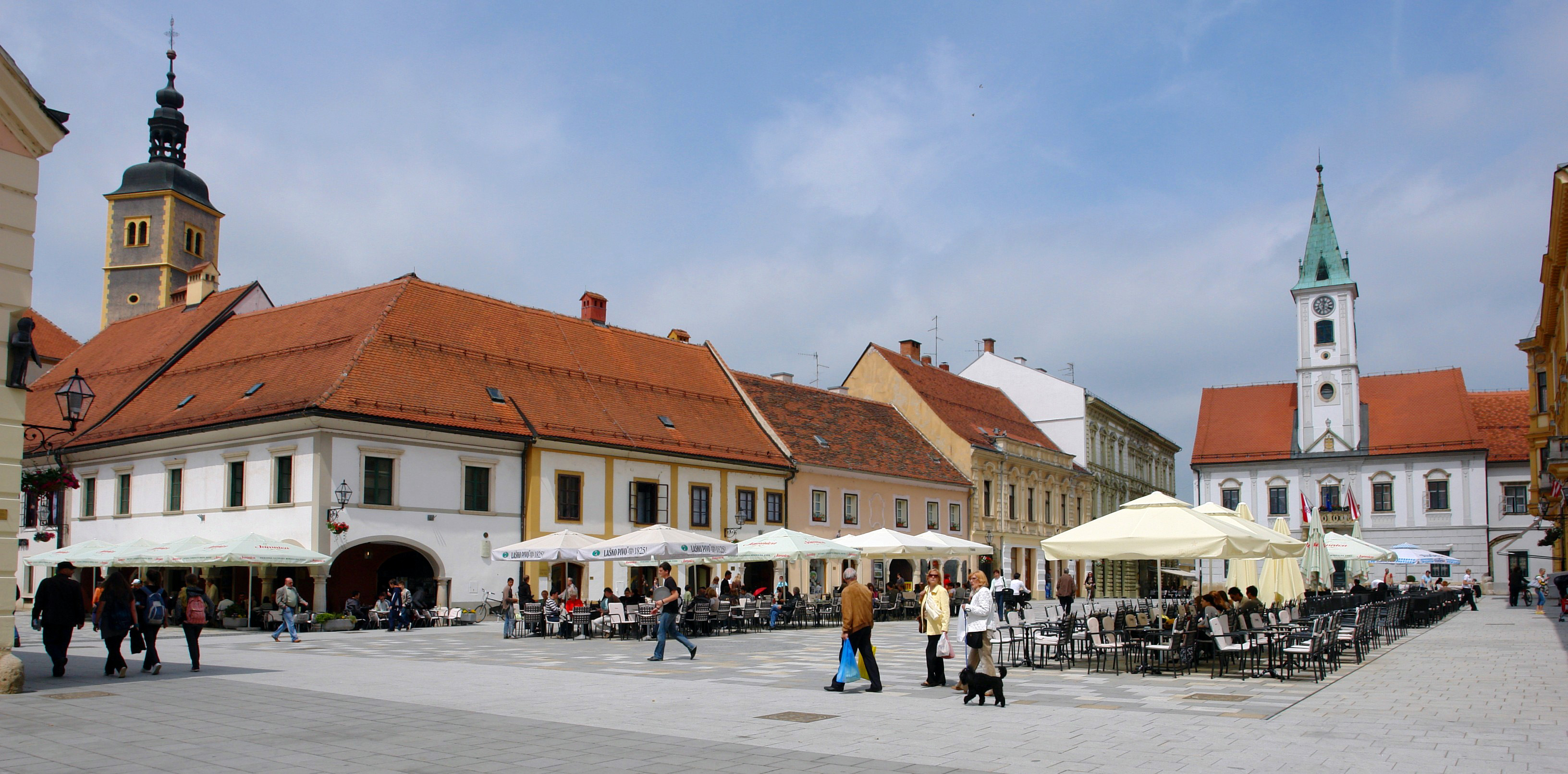

- Flag Coat of arms

- Varaždin County within Croatia
- Country: Croatia
- County seat: Varaždin

Government
  - Župan (Prefect): Anđelko Stričak (HDZ)
  - Assembly: 41 members: • SDP, HNS, HSS, HSU, HL (19); • HDZ, HSLS (13); • NS-R (7); • PiP (2)

Area
  - Total: 1,262 km^{2} (487 sq mi)

Population (2021)
  - Total: 159,747
  - Density: 126.6/km^{2} (327.8/sq mi)
- Area code: 042
- ISO 3166 code: HR-05
- HDI (2022): 0.862 very high · 6th
- Website: varazdinska-zupanija.hr

Varaždin County (Croatian: Varaždinska županija) is a county in Hrvatsko zagorje, in northern Croatia. It is named after its county seat, the city of Varaždin.

County day (Dan županije) is celebrated on 5 September.

== Geography ==
The county contains the city of Varaždin, the towns of: Ivanec, Ludbreg, Lepoglava, Novi Marof and Varaždinske Toplice, as well as 22 municipalities. It covers an area of 1,262 square kilometres (487 sq mi) and had a population of 175,951 in the 2011 census.

Varaždin County borders Slovenia to the northwest, Međimurje County to the north, Krapina-Zagorje County to the southwest, Zagreb County to the south, and Koprivnica-Križevci County to the southeast, with a small portion of the latter separating it from Hungary.

The Drava flows along the northern border of the county. There are three reservoirs on the river – Lake Ormož, Lake Varaždin and Lake Dubrava. All of them are partially located within the county. Another river flowing through the county is the Bednja, which also confluences with the Drava within the county. There are also the mountains of Ivanščica (also known as Ivančica) and Kalnik.

== Transport ==
The highway A4 (part of Pan-European Corridor Vb and European route E65) passes through the county, connecting the Hungarian border (in the north) with Zagreb (in the south), and which has exits in Varaždin, Varaždinske Toplice and Novi Marof. In the longitudinal (east-west) direction, a magistral road passes along the Drava river, spanning from Maribor (Slovenia) to Osijek. Railways (not yet modernised) passing through the county lead to Zagreb in the south, Čakovec and Budapest (Hungary) in the north and Koprivnica in the east.

== Economy ==
The economy of Varaždin County is focused on the manufacturing industry, particularly on the milk products processing, beverage production, meat-packing industry, clothing and textiles industry, metal manufacturing industry, leather footwear industry, manufacturing of high-quality wood furniture and other lumber products.

== Administrative division ==
Varaždin county is divided into:

- City of Varaždin (county seat)
- Town of Ludbreg
- Town of Lepoglava
- Town of Ivanec
- Town of Novi Marof
- Town of Varaždinske Toplice
- Municipality of Bednja
- Municipality of Beretinec
- Municipality of Breznica
- Municipality of Breznički Hum
- Municipality of Cestica
- Municipality of Donja Voća
- Municipality of Gornji Kneginec
- Municipality of Jalžabet
- Municipality of Klenovnik
- Municipality of Ljubešćica
- Municipality of Mali Bukovec
- Municipality of Martijanec
- Municipality of Maruševec
- Municipality of Petrijanec
- Municipality of Sračinec
- Municipality of Sveti Đurđ
- Municipality of Sveti Ilija
- Municipality of Trnovec Bartolovečki
- Municipality of Veliki Bukovec
- Municipality of Vidovec
- Municipality of Vinica
- Municipality of Visoko

== Demographics ==
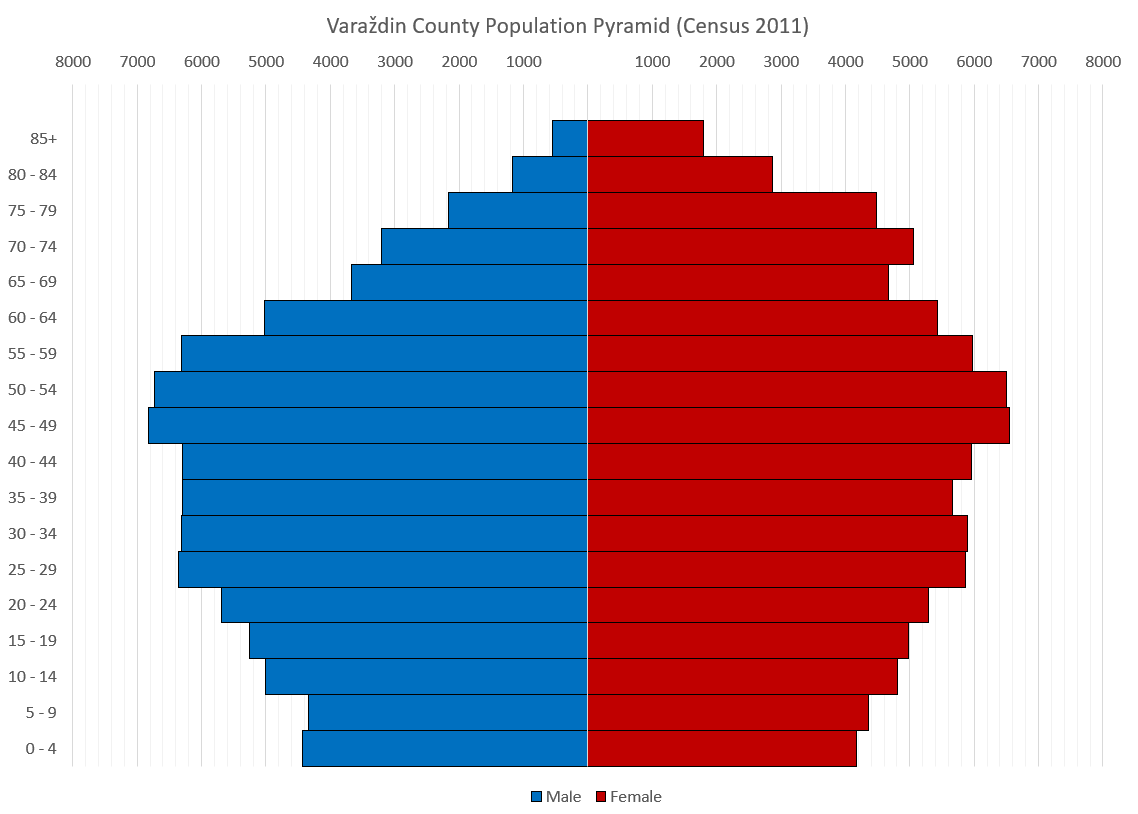
Population pyramid of Varaždin County per 2011 Census.

Historical populations of Varaždin County

Year	Pop.	±%
1857	87,960	—
1869	99,194	+12.8%
1880	105,612	+6.5%
1890	120,397	+14.0%
1900	131,849	+9.5%
1910	144,720	+9.8%
1921	147,524	+1.9%
1931	159,767	+8.3%
1948	174,682	+9.3%

Year	Pop.	±%
1953	177,352	+1.5%
1961	179,905	+1.4%
1971	184,380	+2.5%
1981	187,495	+1.7%
1991	187,853	+0.2%
2001	184,769	−1.6%
2011	175,951	−4.8%
2021	159,747	−9.2%

Source: Naselja i stanovništvo Republike Hrvatske 1857–2001, Croatian Bureau of Statistics, Zagreb, 2005

According to the 2011 census, Varaždin County has a population of 175,951. Ethnic Croats make up a majority with 97.9% of the population.

Varaždin County: Population trends 1857–2021
v

population	87960	99194	105612	120397	131849	144720	147524	159767	174682	177352	179905	184380	187495	187853	184769	175951	159747
	1857	1869	1880	1890	1900	1910	1921	1931	1948	1953	1961	1971	1981	1991	2001	2011	2021

Sources: Croatian Bureau of Statistics publications

== Acknowledgements ==
On September 5, 2025, the President of the Government of the Herzegovina-Neretva County, Marija Buhač, and the County Prefect, Anđelko Stričak, signed an agreement on cooperation between the two counties in the areas of economy, education, agriculture, tourism, culture, sports and youth.

Honorary citizens

- Zlatko Dalić (2018)

== See also ==
- Roman Catholic Diocese of Varaždin
