= Bělá =

Bělá may refer to:

== Places in the Czech Republic ==
- Bělá (Havlíčkův Brod District), a municipality and village in the Vysočina Region
- Bělá (Opava District), a municipality and village in the Moravian-Silesian Region
- Bělá (Pelhřimov District), a municipality and village in the Vysočina Region
- Bělá (Semily District), a municipality and village in the Liberec Region
- Bělá, a village and part of Bělá pod Pradědem in the Olomouc Region
- Bělá, a village and part of Liberk in the Hradec Králové Region
- Bělá, a village and part of Luže (Chrudim District) in the Pardubice Region
- Bělá, a village and part of Malonty in the South Bohemian Region
- Bělá (Mírová pod Kozákovem), a village and part of Mírová pod Kozákovem in the Liberec Region
- Bělá, a village and part of Nová Pec in the South Bohemian Region
- Bělá nad Radbuzou, a town in the Plzeň Region
- Bělá nad Svitavou, a municipality and village in the Pardubice Region
- Bělá pod Bezdězem, a town in the Central Bohemian Region
- Bělá pod Pradědem, a municipality and village in the Olomouc Region
- Bělá u Jevíčka, a municipality and village in the Pardubice Region
- Česká Bělá, a market town in the Vysočina Region
- Děčín X-Bělá, a part of Děčín in the Ústí nad Labem Region
- Dolní Bělá, a municipality and village in the Plzeň Region
- Horní Bělá, a municipality and village in the Plzeň Region
- Rohovládova Bělá, a municipality and village in the Pardubice Region

== Rivers ==
- Bělá (Divoká Orlice), a river in the Czech Republic
- Bělá (Eastern Neisse), a river in the Czech Republic and Poland
- Biela (river), Czech name Bělá, a river in Germany and the Czech Republic

== Castles ==
- Bělá Castle, a castle in Dolní Bělá, Czech Republic

== See also ==
- Belá (disambiguation), the Slovak form of Bělá
- Biała (disambiguation), the Polish form of Bělá
