= Bela =

Bela may refer to:

== Places ==
=== Asia ===
- Bela Pratapgarh, a town in Pratapgarh District, Uttar Pradesh, India
- Bela, Adilabad district, a village in Adilabad District, Telangana, India
- Bela, a small village near Bhandara, Maharashtra, India
- Bela, another name for the biblical city Zoara
- Bela, Dang, in Nepal
- Bela, Janakpur, in Nepal
- Bela, Pakistan, a town in Balochistan, Pakistan

=== Europe ===
- Bela, Vidin Province, a village in Bulgaria
- Bela, Varaždin County, a village in Croatia
- Bělá (disambiguation), places in the Czech Republic
- River Bela, in Cumbria, England
- Bela (Epirus), a medieval fortress and bishopric in Epirus, Greece
- Bela, a village administered by Pucioasa town, Dâmboviţa County, Romania
- Belá (disambiguation), places in Slovakia
- Bela, Ajdovščina, Slovenia
- Bela, Kamnik, Slovenia

== People ==
- Běla, female given name of Czech origin
- Béla (given name), Hungarian male name
- Béla of Hungary (disambiguation), any of five kings of Hungary to bear that name
- Bela (or Belah), the name of three Biblical figures, including
  - Bela ben Beor, king of Edom
- Bela of Saint Omer (died 1258), Crusader lord of one half of Thebes
- Bela B (born 1962), German musician
- Bela Padilla (Krista Elyse Hidalgo Sullivan; born 1991), Filipino actress
- Bela of Britonia, clergyman and bishop
- Béla Tarr (1955–2026), Hungarian director, screenwriter, and producer
- Jacques de Bela (1586–1667), French-Basque lawyer and writer
- Jean Philippe de Bela (1703–1796), French-Basque military figure and writer
- Jérémie Bela (born 1993), French footballer
- Leila Bela (born 1970), Iranian-American avant-garde musician

== Arts, entertainment, and media ==
=== Fictional entities ===
- Bela (comics), a Marvel Comics character
- Bela, a female character in Lermontov's novel A Hero of Our Time
- Bela Talbot, a character in the third season of the television series Supernatural

=== Games ===
- Bela (card game), a trick-taking card game, also called Belot
  - Bela, a declaration in the card game of the same name

== Biology ==
- Bela (gastropod), a genus of sea snails
- Bela, the fruit of the tree Aegle marmelos

== Organizations ==
- Bangladesh Environmental Lawyers Association (BELA)
- Black Entertainment and Sports Lawyers Association (BESLA), formerly known as the Black Entertainment Lawyers Association (BELA)

== Other uses ==
- Basic Education Laws Amendment Act, 2024 South African legislation
- Bela biscuit, a tea biscuit from Chittagong, Bangladesh
- BELA, the stock symbol for the Greek company Jumbo S.A.

== See also ==
- Belah
- Bijela (disambiguation)
- Bella (disambiguation)
