= Bellas =

Bellas may refer to:

- Bellas, Aïn Defla, a town in northern Algeria
- Bellas Brook, a stream in Wyoming County, Pennsylvania
- Benjamin Bellas (born 1976), American artist
- Bill Bellas (1925–1994), English footballer
- Bruce Bellas (1909–1974), American photographer of the physique of nude males
- Giselle Bellas (active from 2015), Cuban-American singer-songwriter
- Jack Bellas (1895–1977), English footballer
- Tomás Bellas (born 1987), Spanish basketball player
- "Bellas" (song), a single by Anthony Santos featuring Romeo Santos

== See also ==
- Bella (disambiguation)
- Bellas Artes (disambiguation)
- Bellas Vistas, an administrative neighborhood (barrio) of Madrid
- Palmas Bellas, a corregimiento in Chagres District, Colón Province, Panama
- The Bella Twins, an American professional wrestling tag team
