= Béla =

Béla may refer to:

- Béla (crater), an elongated lunar crater
- Béla (given name), a common Hungarian male given name

== See also ==
- Bela (disambiguation)
- Belá (disambiguation)
- Bělá (disambiguation)
