= Bella (disambiguation) =

Bella is a feminine given name.

Bella may also refer to:

== Magazines ==
- BELLA (American magazine), a lifestyle magazine
- Bella (British magazine), a weekly women's magazine
- Bella (German magazine), a weekly women's magazine

== Music ==
=== Bands ===
- Bella (Australian band), a country music trio
- Bella (Canadian band), a Canadian indie pop band

=== Albums ===
- Bella (album), released in 2011 by Teddy Thompson
- Bella (EP), a 2005 EP by Fivespeed
- Bella EP, a 2013 EP by Maître Gims

=== Songs ===
- "Bella" (Maître Gims song), from the 2013 album Subliminal
- "Bella", Spanish version of the Ricky Martin 1999 song "She's All I Ever Had"
- "Bella", a 2017 single from Bryce Vine
- "Bella", a 2021 song by Static & Ben-El Tavori featuring 24KGoldn
- "Bella" (Aidan song), a 2026 single from Aidan

== Places ==
- Bella, Basilicata, a city and commune in Italy
- Bella River, Romania
- 695 Bella, an asteroid

== Other uses ==
- Bella (surname)
- Bella (2006 film), an American drama film
- Bella (2017 film), a Ugandan drama film
- BELLA (laser), the Berkeley Lab Laser Accelerator
- Bella Books, a publisher of lesbian literature
- Bella (brand), a brand of feminine hygiene products
- Bella Center, a congress and exhibition center in Copenhagen, Denmark
- Bella the Alamo cat, a cat residing on the property of the Alamo Mission
- Zündapp Bella, a motor scooter manufactured by Zündapp from 1953 to 1964
- Bella 1, an oil tanker seized by the United States

== See also ==
- Bela (disambiguation)
- Bellas (disambiguation)
- Belle (disambiguation)
- Bel (disambiguation)
