= Remetinec =

Remetinec may refer to:

- Remetinec, Zagreb, a suburb of Zagreb
- Remetinec prison, located in Remetinec, Zagreb
- Remetinec, Varaždin County, a village near Novi Marof
- Remetinec, Zagreb County, a village near Gradec
