= Angelia Bibbs-Sanders =

American businesswoman

- Born: Winona, Mississippi, United States
- Education: California State University, Long Beach
- Occupation: Businesswoman
- Known for: President and CEO of The Debut Group; former Vice President of Member Services at National Academy of Recording Arts and Sciences
- Children: 2

Angelia Bibbs-Sanders is the President/CEO of the Debut Group and formerly the Vice President of Member Services at the National Academy of Recording Arts and Sciences (NARAS).

== Early life and career ==
Bibbs-Sanders was born in Winona, Mississippi but grew up in Fresno, California. She majored in Business Administration at California State University, Long Beach with a minor in Marketing. Bibbs-Sanders’ career in the entertainment industry began at Motown Records where she helped plan marketing strategies for Stevie Wonder, Lionel Richie, Rick James, and Smokey Robinson. She rose to Director of Artist Relations for the label.

After Motown, Bibbs-Sanders joined RCA Records as Director of Marketing Operations. She also worked with Jive Records. She was involved with a roster that included DJ Jazzy Jeff & The Fresh Prince, Kool Moe Dee, KRS-One, Too Short, and Jonathan Butler.

Bibbs-Sanders was appointed to Vice President of Member Services at National Academy of Recording Arts and Sciences.

== Current projects ==
In 2010, Bibbs-Sanders founded ABS Collective, an entertainment consulting company engaged in the following projects:

- Goapele - A singer/songwriter.
- BHCP Live! - A series of free soul, R&B, jazz, and Latin concerts with up to 3,000 attendees per show. Previous performers include Drake, Sheila E, Keb Mo, Ledisi, El Debarge and Rachelle Ferrell.
- Rowdy/BKE (“Beat Thang”) - a portable music-production unit co-developed by Grammy winning producer and songwriter Dallas Austin (Rowdy Electronics) and BKE (Beat Kangz Electronics).
- The Guild Of Music Supervisors (GMS) – A resource for the film, television and game industries, GMS strives to preserve and promote the craft of music supervision.
- Black Entertainment and Sports Lawyers Association (BESLA) - A professional organization of entertainment attorneys and sports agents that provide continuing education and other support services to its members.

Bibbs-Sanders is also a member of the Brain Trust, a group of women who volunteer their time and efforts to raise funds and awareness for the work of Keith Black, MD. She has also worked with Rickey Minor Productions, Stand Up to Cancer, Entertainment Industry Foundation, UNICEF Playlist with the A-List, and Stevie Wonder's House Full of Toys.

== Awards ==
- 2005 Top 20 Women in Music Billboard Magazine #18
- 2006 Top 20 Women in Music Billboard Magazine #17
- 2007 Top 20 Women in Music Billboard Magazine #18
