= Ivan Rabuzin =

Croatian naive painter (1921–2008)

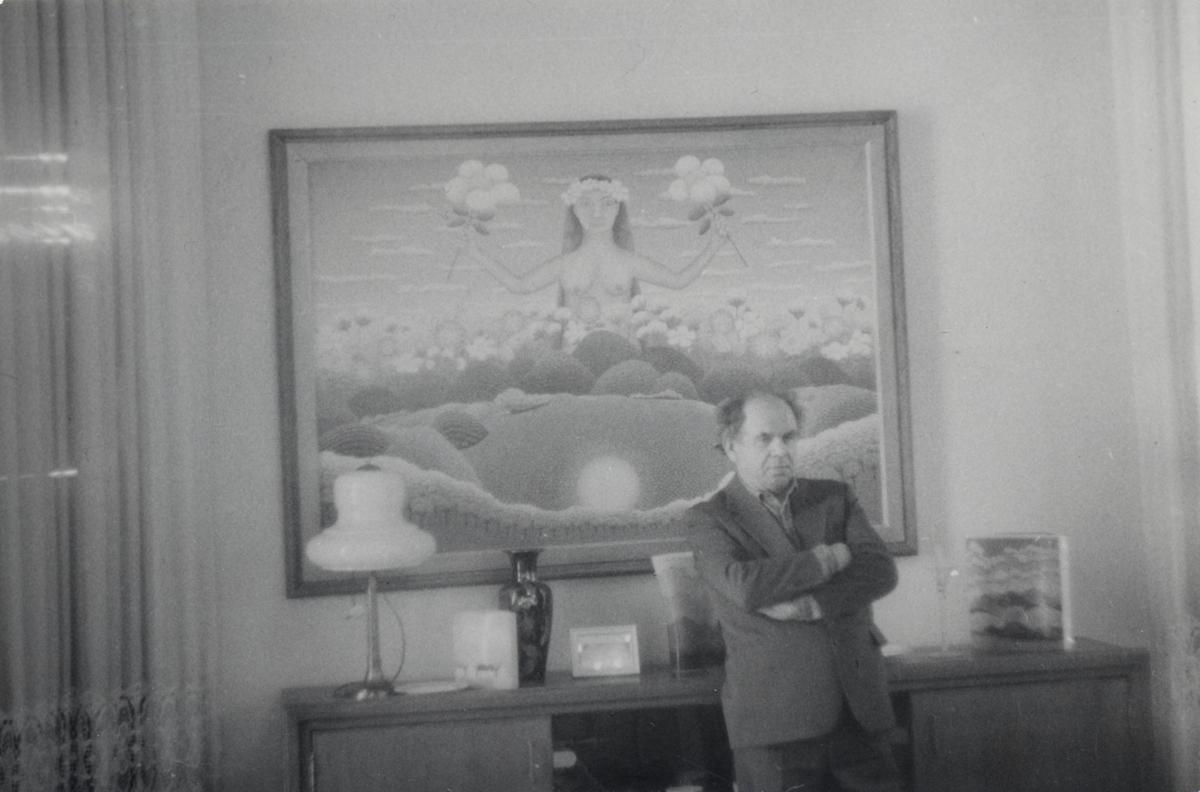
- Born: 27 March 1921; Ključ, Kingdom of Serbs, Croats and Slovenes
- Died: 18 December 2008 (aged 87); Varaždin, Croatia
- Known for: Painting
- Movement: Naïve art

Ivan Rabuzin (27 March 1921 – 18 December 2008) was a Croatian naïve artist. French art critic Anatole Jakovsky described him in 1972 as "one of the greatest naïve painters of all times and countries".

Rabuzin's father was a miner, and Ivan was the sixth of his eleven children. Ivan worked as a carpenter for many years, and did not begin painting until 1956, when he was thirty-five years old. He had little formal training as an artist, but his first solo exhibition in 1960 proved successful and he changed careers, becoming a professional painter in 1962. His 1963 exhibition in Galerie Mona Lisa in Paris marked the beginning of the rise of his international reputation.

Rabuzin's art is characterized by dense geometric patterns of vegetation and clouds that form rich, arabesque-like structures painted in gentle pastel colors. His motifs were described as an "idealistic reconstruction of the world". He took a stab at industrial design in the 1970s with a 500-piece run of the upscale Suomi tableware by Timo Sarpaneva that Rabuzin decorated for the German Rosenthal porcelain maker's Studio Linie. In 1989, at the time of the 9th Summit of the Non-Aligned Movement in Belgrade, municipalities from Zagorje, Gospić, Karlovac and Sisak region provided a mural by Ivan Rabuzin as a commemorative gift for a building in Knez Mihailova Street.

Rabuzin was active in politics as a member of Croatian Democratic Union, and from 1993 to 1999 he was also a member of the Croatian Parliament (in the second and third assemblies).

Rabuzin stopped painting in 2002 due to an illness. He died on 18 December 2008 in a hospital in Varaždin, Croatia.

== See also ==
- On the hills - virgin forest
