= Novi Marof =

- Town
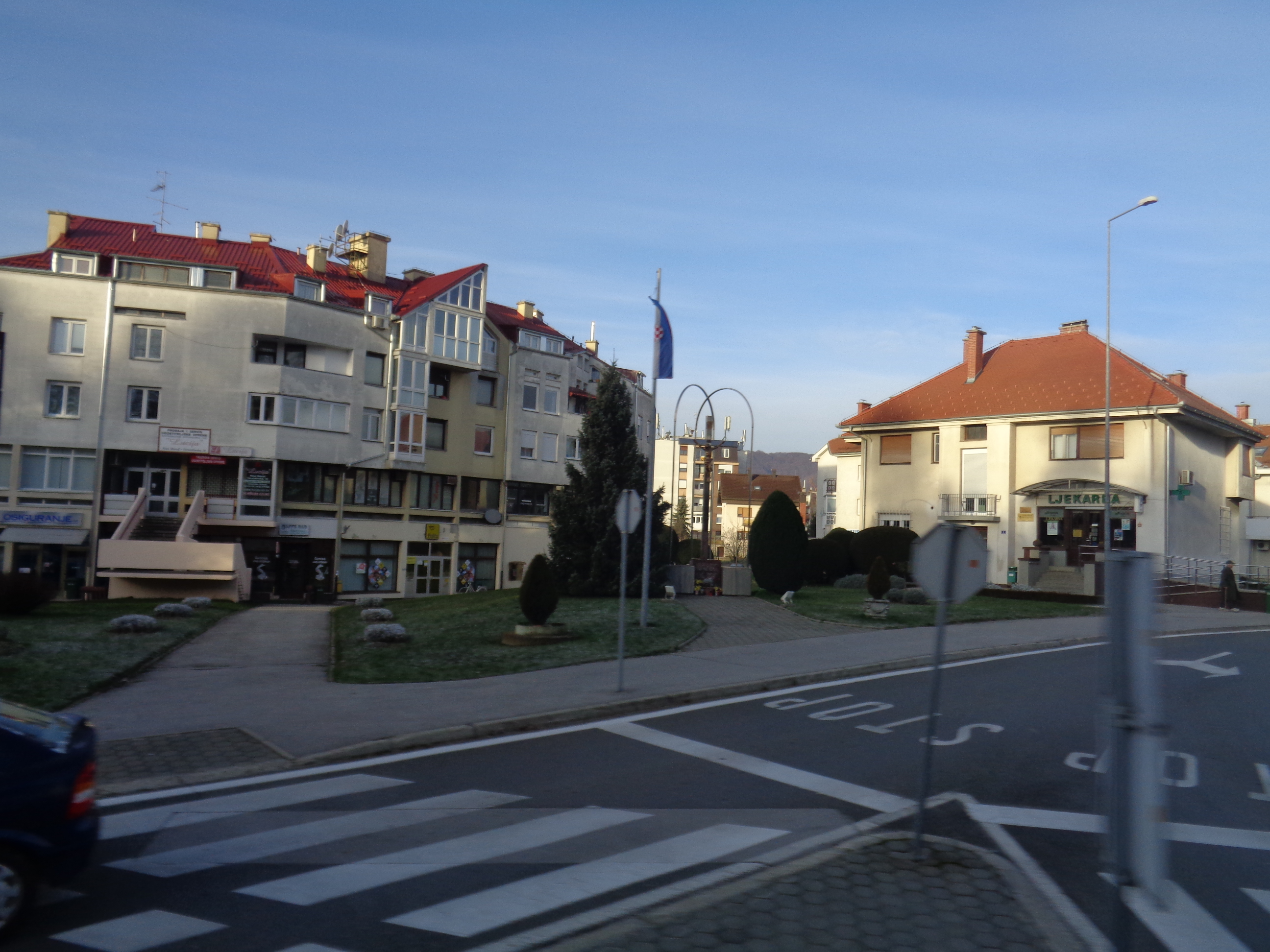
- Town centre
- Interactive map of Novi Marof
- Location of Novi Marof in Croatia
- Coordinates: 46.164401°N 16.334642°E
- Country: Croatia
- Region: Central Croatia (Hrvatsko Zagorje)
- County: Varaždin County

Government
  - Mayor: Siniša Jenkač (HDZ)

Area
  - Town: 111.9 km^{2} (43.2 sq mi)
  - Urban: 3.7 km^{2} (1.4 sq mi)

Population (2021)
  - Town: 11,795
  - Density: 105.4/km^{2} (273.0/sq mi)
  - Urban: 1,810
  - Urban density: 490/km^{2} (1,300/sq mi)
- Time zone: UTC+1 (CET)
  - Summer (DST): UTC+2 (CEST)
- Website: novi-marof.hr

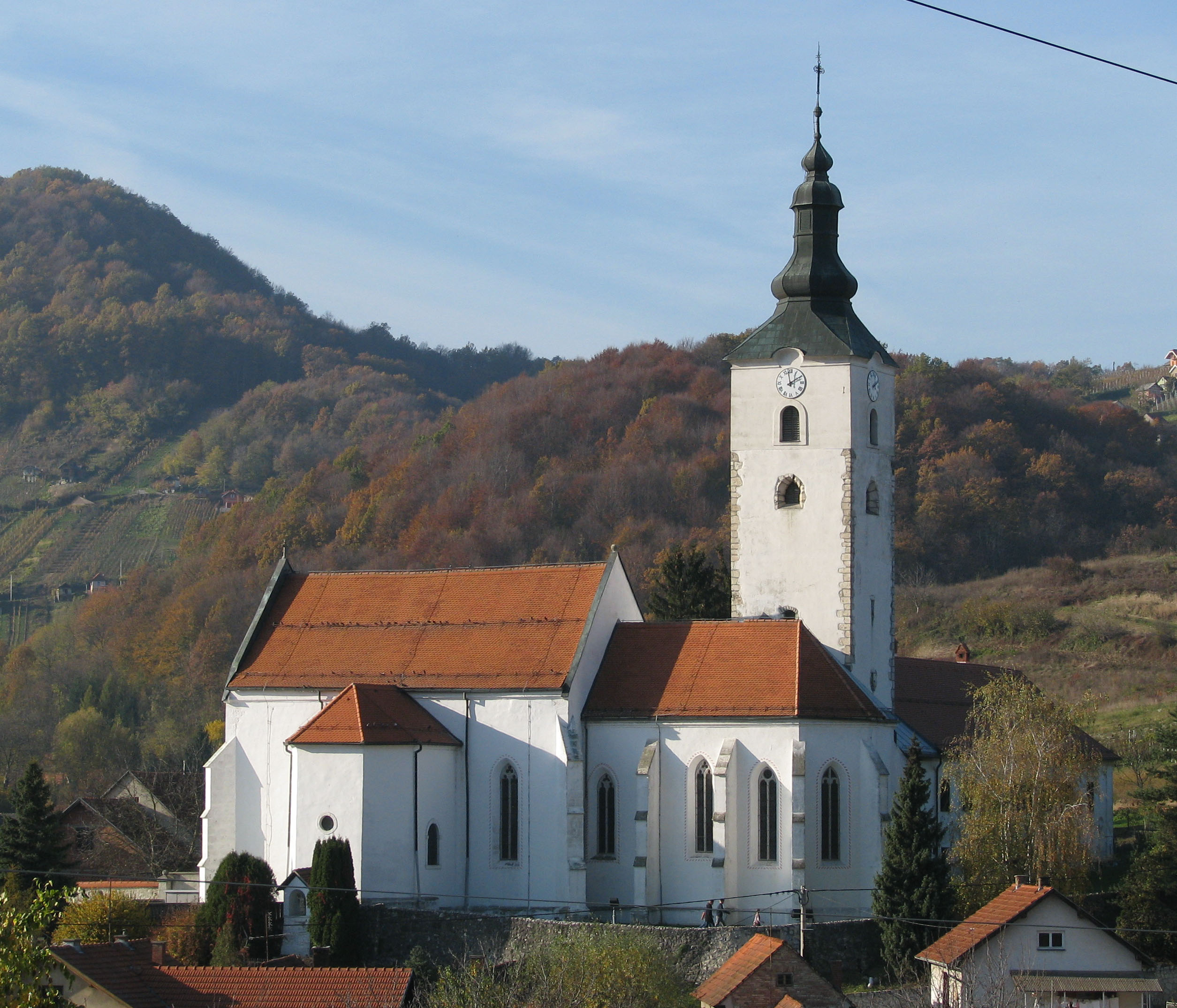
Church in Remetinec near Novi Marof

Novi Marof (Kajkavian: Nuovi Narof) is a town in north-western Croatia, located south of Varaždin and east of Ivanec, in Varaždin County. It lies on the intersection of state roads D3 (from south to north) and D24 (from the west) and is also connected with highway A4, state road D22 (from the east) and R201 railway.

== History ==
In the late 19th and early 20th century, Novi Marof was a district capital in Varaždin County of the Kingdom of Croatia-Slavonia.

== Climate ==
Since records began in 1981, the highest temperature recorded at the local weather station was 38.0 °C (100.4 °F), on 5 August 2012. The coldest temperature was −25.0 °C (−13.0 °F), on 8 January 1985.

== Population ==
The population of the municipality is 13,246 (census 2011), distributed in the following settlements:

- Bela, population 62
- Donje Makojišće, population 526
- Filipići, population 122
- Gornje Makojišće, population 400
- Grana, population 526
- Jelenščak, population 213
- Kamena Gorica, population 232
- Ključ, population 928
- Krč, population 418
- Madžarevo, population 910
- Možđenec, population 677
- Novi Marof, population 1,956
- Orehovec, population 297
- Oštrice, population 452
- Paka, population 81
- Podevčevo, population 737
- Podrute, population 421
- Presečno, population 893
- Remetinec, population 1,477
- Strmec Remetinečki, population 511
- Sudovec, population 350
- Topličica, population 207
- Završje Podbelsko, population 850
Town of Novi Marof: Population trends 1857–2021
v

population	7016	7973	8406	9688	11171	12222	12497	14028	14897	14768	14270	14364	14180	14350	13857	13246	11795
	1857	1869	1880	1890	1900	1910	1921	1931	1948	1953	1961	1971	1981	1991	2001	2011	2021

Sources: Croatian Bureau of Statistics publications

== Notable residents ==
- Blaženko Lacković, Croatian handball player

== Culture ==
The town was the home of the Croatian independent record label Ill In The Head until it relocated to Canada. The town has memorial markers to:

- Croatian soldiers and civilians who died or went missing during and after World War II
- 1992 European Community Monitor Mission helicopter downing during the Croatian War of Independence
