= On the Hills - Virgin Forest =

Painting by Ivan Rabuzin

- Na bregovima - prašuma (Croatian)
- Artist: Ivan Rabuzin
- Year: 1960
- Medium: oil on canvas
- Dimensions: 69.2 cm × 116.7 cm (27.2 in × 45.9 in)
- Location: Croatian Museum of Naive Art; Zagreb

On the Hills - Virgin Forest (Croatian: Na bregovima - prašuma) is a 1960 painting by Croatian artist Ivan Rabuzin from 1960.

== Description ==
The 69.2 x 116.7 cm. oil painting is held by the Croatian Museum of Naive Art in Zagreb.

== Analysis ==
The naive style is typical of Ivan Rabuzin; lyrical and idealized landscapes based on a sequence of circles or round shapes, filled with optimism and spirituality. His style is recognized worldwide as unique and great contribution to the development of naïve art. It is characterized by modernism of visual expression, as it reduces the use of geometric shapes, causing his art to be among the legacy of contemporary art. His works are easily recognizable thanks to the combination of stylization and geometric abstraction. The colors in his paintings highlight the location and size of the images, highlighting their symbolic significance and importance.
