= Presečno, Croatia =

Coordinates: 46°12′04″N 16°20′53″E

Presečno
- Village
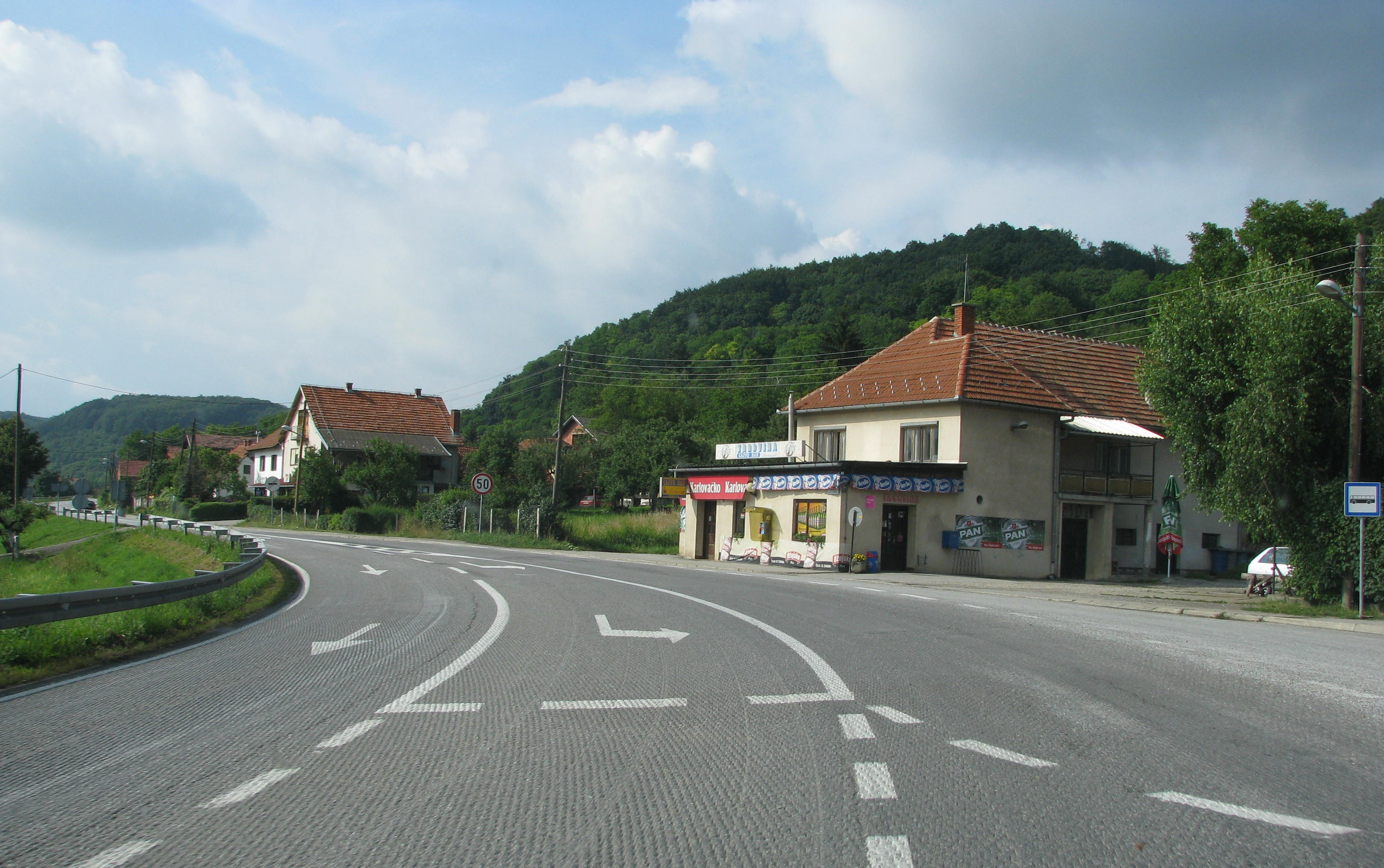
- Main road through Presečno, Croatia
- Interactive map of Presečno
- Country: Croatia

Area
  - Total: 2.0 sq mi (5.1 km^{2})

Population (2021)
  - Total: 793
  - Density: 400/sq mi (160/km^{2})
- Time zone: UTC+1 (CET)
  - Summer (DST): UTC+2 (CEST)

Presečno is a village near Novi Marof in northern Croatia. It is connected by the D3 highway.
