= Mírová pod Kozákovem =

Municipality in the Liberec Region, Czech Republic

- Municipality
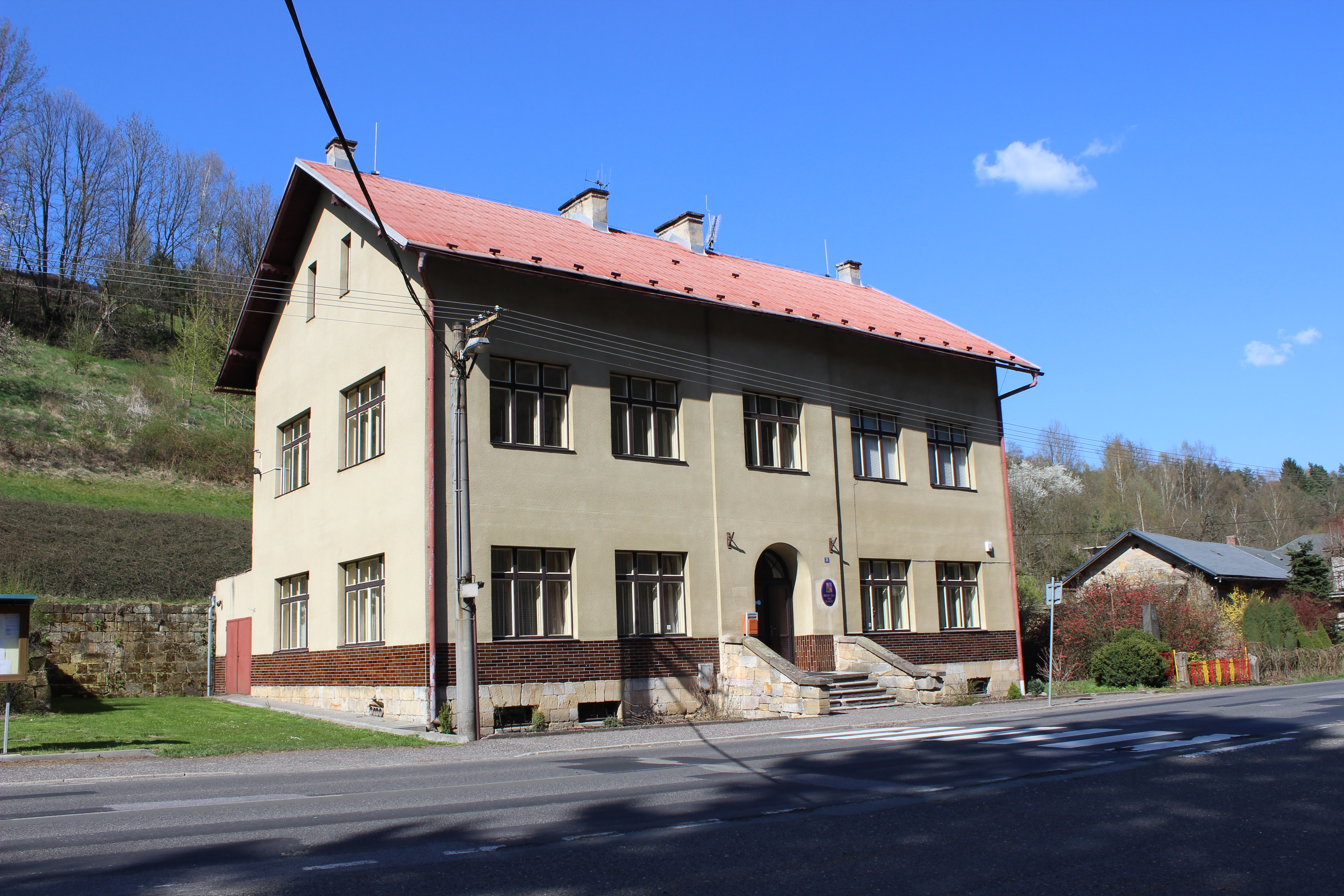
- Municipal office

- Location in the Czech Republic
- Coordinates: 50°35′30″N 15°11′40″E
- Country: Czech Republic
- Region: Liberec
- District: Semily
- Established: 1960

Area
  - Total: 19.24 km^{2} (7.43 sq mi)
- Elevation: 361 m (1,184 ft)

Population (2026-01-01)
  - Total: 1,730
  - Density: 89.9/km^{2} (233/sq mi)
- Time zone: UTC+1 (CET)
  - Summer (DST): UTC+2 (CEST)
- Postal code: 511 01
- Website: www.mirova.cz

Mírová pod Kozákovem is a municipality in Semily District in the Liberec Region of the Czech Republic. It has about 1,700 inhabitants.

== Administrative division ==
Mírová pod Kozákovem consists of 14 municipal parts (in brackets population according to the 2021 census):

- Bělá (308)
- Bukovina (207)
- Chloumek (84)
- Chutnovka (232)
- Dubecko (32)
- Hrachovice (88)
- Kvítkovice (15)
- Loktuše (112)
- Prackov (49)
- Rohliny (81)
- Sekerkovy Loučky (176)
- Smrčí (131)
- Stebno (18)
- Vesec (216)

The municipal office is located in Chutnovka.

== Etymology ==
The Czech word mírová is an adjective meaning 'peace'. The suffix pod Kozákovem means 'below Kozákov'.

== Geography ==
Mírová pod Kozákovem is located about 3 kilometres (2 mi) east of Turnov and 20 km (12 mi) southeast of Liberec. The Stebenka Stream flows across the municipality. It lies mostly in a hilly landscape in the Jičín Uplands, only the eastern part of the municipality is crossed by the Ještěd–Kozákov Ridge. The highest point is on the slopes of the mountain Kozákov at 736 m (2,415 ft) above sea level.

== History ==
The first written mention of settlements in the area of Mírová pod Kozákovem is from 1230. Mírová pod Kozákovem was established in 1960 by the merger of the municipalities of Vesec (including Smrčí and Prackov), Loktuše, Sekerkovy Loučky (including Chutnovka, Dubecko, Hrachovice, Kvítkovice and Stebno) and Bělá (including Bukovina, Chloumek and Rohliny).

== Demographics ==
Historical population

Year	Pop.	±%
1869	1,875	—
1880	2,112	+12.6%
1890	2,327	+10.2%
1900	2,291	−1.5%
1910	2,275	−0.7%

Year	Pop.	±%
1921	2,209	−2.9%
1930	2,142	−3.0%
1950	1,583	−26.1%
1961	1,686	+6.5%
1970	1,506	−10.7%

Year	Pop.	±%
1980	1,357	−9.9%
1991	1,360	+0.2%
2001	1,370	+0.7%
2011	1,586	+15.8%
2021	1,749	+10.3%

Source: Censuses

== Transport ==
There are no railways or major roads passing through the municipality.

== Education ==
There are two schools in Mírová pod Kozákovem, a kindergarten in Chutnovka and a primary school (1st–5th grade) in Bělá. The municipality founds both schools.

== Sights ==
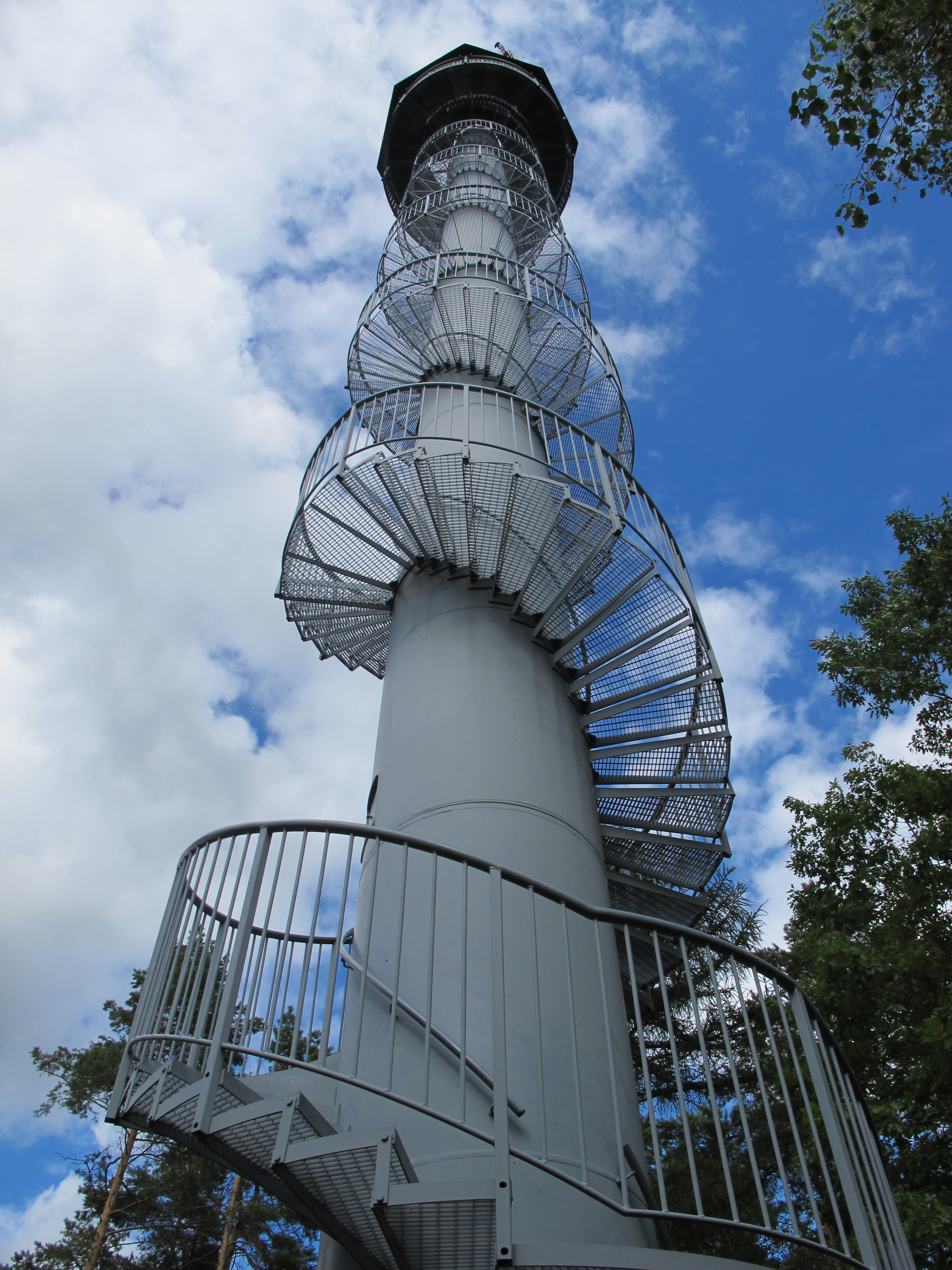
Dubecko observation tower

There are two notable sights in the municipality. In Dubecko on the hill Dubecko with an altitude of 399 m (1,309 ft) is an eponymous telecommunication tower with an observation tower. The viewing platform is located at a height 33 m (108 ft).

In Bukovina are the ruins of Rotštejn Castle. This Gothic castle was founded around 1250. It was a building partly brick and partly carved into a block of four sandstone rocks. In 1514, it was listed as desolate. The destruction of the castle was probably caused by the natural weathering of sandstone rocks and the subsequent decline of the terrain.
