= Donje Makojišće =

Coordinates: 46°09′N 16°17′E

- Village
- Interactive map of Donje Makojišće
- Country: Croatia
- County: Varaždin County
- Town: Novi Marof

Area
  - Total: 8.3 km^{2} (3.2 sq mi)

Population (2021)
  - Total: 408
  - Density: 49/km^{2} (130/sq mi)
- Time zone: UTC+1 (CET)
  - Summer (DST): UTC+2 (CEST)

Donje Makojišće is a village in northern Croatia's Varaždin County.
