= Podrute =

- Village
- Interactive map of Podrute
- Location within Croatia
- Coordinates: 46.165793°N 16.245536°E
- Country: Croatia
- County: Varaždin County
- Municipality: Novi Marof

Area
  - Total: 7.7 km^{2} (3.0 sq mi)

Population (2021)
  - Total: 281
  - Density: 36/km^{2} (95/sq mi)
- Time zone: UTC+1 (CET)
  - Summer (DST): UTC+2 (CEST)

Podrute is a village near Novi Marof in northern Croatia. It is connected by the D24 highway and R201 railway.

The 1992 European Community Monitor Mission helicopter downing occurred in the airspace above Podrute.
