= Belá =

Belá may refer to:

== Places in Slovakia ==
- Belá, Nové Zámky District, a municipality and village
- Belá, Žilina District, a village and municipality
- Belá (river)

== Other uses ==
- Belá (ballet), choreographed by Tim Rushton

== See also ==
- Bela (disambiguation)
- Béla (disambiguation)
- Bělá (disambiguation)
- Banská Belá, a village and municipality in Banská Štiavnica District, Banská Bystrica Region, Slovakia
- Spišská Belá, a town in Kežmarok District, Prešov Region, Slovakia
