= Završje Podbelsko =

Coordinates: 46°12′58″N 16°16′16″E

- Village
- Interactive map of Završje Podbelsko
- Country: Croatia

Area
  - Total: 2.7 sq mi (7.0 km^{2})

Population (2021)
  - Total: 779
  - Density: 290/sq mi (110/km^{2})
- Time zone: UTC+1 (CET)
  - Summer (DST): UTC+2 (CEST)
- Website: http://www.zavrsje-podbelsko.com.hr/

Završje Podbelsko is a village in northern Croatia. It is near Novi Marof in Varaždin County.
