= Dolní Bělá =

Municipality in the Plzeň Region, Czech Republic

- Municipality
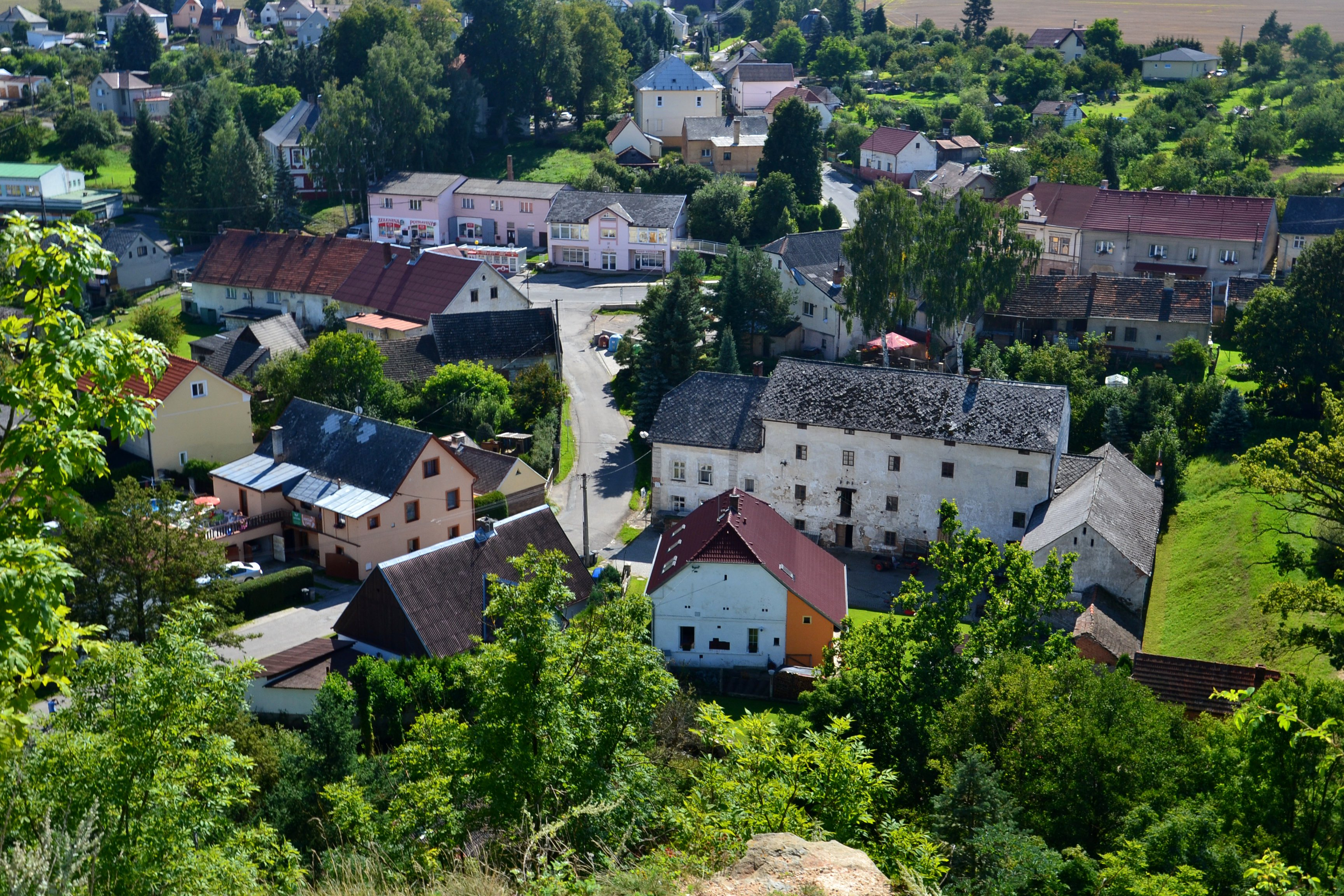
- Centre of Dolní Bělá

- Flag Coat of arms

- Location in the Czech Republic
- Coordinates: 49°53′47″N 13°16′24″E
- Country: Czech Republic
- Region: Plzeň
- District: Plzeň-North
- First mentioned: 1318

Area
  - Total: 2.15 km^{2} (0.83 sq mi)
- Elevation: 460 m (1,510 ft)

Population (2026-01-01)
  - Total: 461
  - Density: 214/km^{2} (555/sq mi)
- Time zone: UTC+1 (CET)
  - Summer (DST): UTC+2 (CEST)
- Postal code: 331 52
- Website: www.dolnibela.cz

Dolní Bělá (Czech pronunciation: [ˈdolɲiː ˈbjɛlaː]) is a municipality and village in Plzeň-North District in the Plzeň Region of the Czech Republic. It has about 500 inhabitants.

== Etymology ==
The name was transferred to the village from the Bělá Stream. Bělá (from bílá, i.e. 'white') is a common Czech name of watercourses, referring to the colour of the water or their location in a treeless landscape and the reflection of the sun in them. In the 17th century, the upper part of the settlement began to be called Horní Bělá ('upper Bělá') and the lower part was called Neustadtel ('new little town' in German). In the 19th century, it was called Český Neustadtl ('Czech/Bohemian Neustadtl') and since 1916, it has been known as Dolní Bělá ('lower Bělá').

== Geography ==
Dolní Bělá is located about 18 kilometres (11 mi) north of Plzeň. It lies mostly in the Plasy Uplands, only the northern part of the municipality extends into the Rakovník Uplands. The highest point is the hill Na Velkém vrchu at 514 m (1,686 ft) above sea level. The Bělá Stream flows through the municipality.

== History ==
The first written mention of Dolní Bělá is from 1318.

== Demographics ==
Historical population

Year	Pop.	±%
1869	675	—
1880	705	+4.4%
1890	659	−6.5%
1900	622	−5.6%
1910	700	+12.5%

Year	Pop.	±%
1921	645	−7.9%
1930	671	+4.0%
1950	495	−26.2%
1961	544	+9.9%
1970	490	−9.9%

Year	Pop.	±%
1980	446	−9.0%
1991	434	−2.7%
2001	451	+3.9%
2011	415	−8.0%
2021	457	+10.1%

Source: Censuses

== Transport ==
There are no railways or major roads passing through the municipality.

== Sights ==
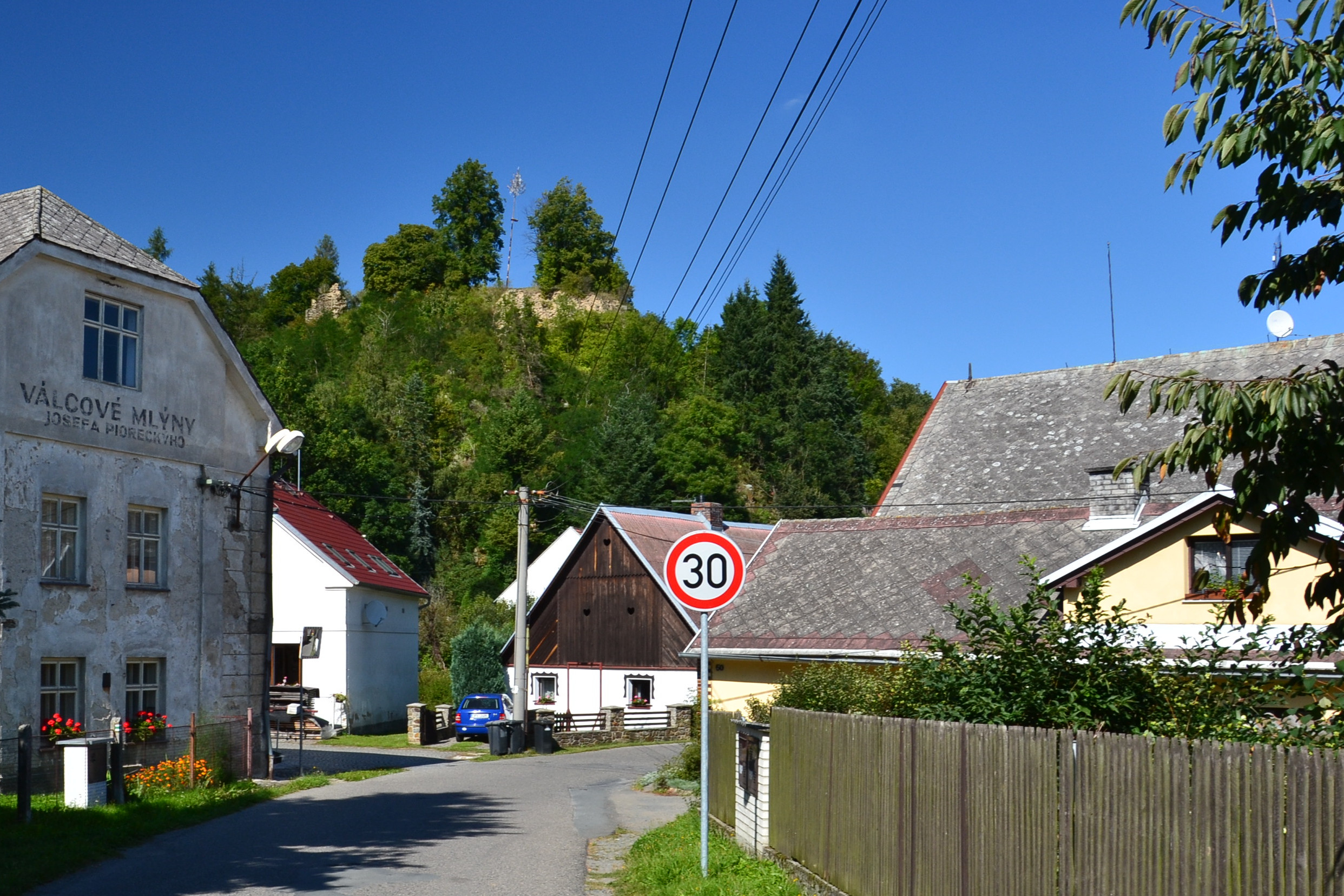
View towards the castle ruin

The main landmark of Dolní Bělá is the Church of Exaltation of the Holy Cross. It was built in the Empire style in 1822.

The ruins of Bělá Castle are located on a hill above the village. The castle was built before 1315. Parts of the castle walls are all that has survived to the present day, and the dry moats and ramparts are still visible in some places.
