= Kamena Gorica =

Coordinates: 46°09′38″N 16°16′05″E

- Village
- Interactive map of Kamena Gorica
- Country: Croatia
- County: Varaždin County
- Town: Novi Marof

Area
  - Total: 5.4 km^{2} (2.1 sq mi)

Population (2021)
  - Total: 186
  - Density: 34/km^{2} (89/sq mi)
- Time zone: UTC+1 (CET)
  - Summer (DST): UTC+2 (CEST)

Kamena Gorica is a village in Varaždin County in Croatia.
