= Grana, Croatia =

Grana
- Village
- Interactive map of Grana
- Location within Croatia
- Coordinates: 46.157488°N 16.327716°E
- Country: Croatia
- County: Varaždin County
- Municipality: Novi Marof

Area
  - Total: 1.4 km^{2} (0.54 sq mi)

Population (2021)
  - Total: 492
  - Density: 350/km^{2} (910/sq mi)
- Time zone: UTC+1 (CET)
  - Summer (DST): UTC+2 (CEST)

Grana is a village in Varaždin County, Croatia. As of 2021, the village population was 492.
