= Béla of Hungary =

Béla of Hungary may refer to:

- Béla I of Hungary (c. 1016–1063), Roman Catholic Hungarian monarch
- Béla II of Hungary (c. 1110–1141), Roman Catholic Hungarian monarch
- Béla III of Hungary (c. 1148–1196), Roman Catholic Hungarian monarch
- Béla IV of Hungary (1206–1270), Roman Catholic Hungarian monarch
