= Bella the Alamo cat =

Cat at the Alamo mission in Texas, USA

- Other name: Isabella Francisca Veramendi de Valero
- Residence: Alamo Mission
- Named after: Francita Alavez, Juan Martín de Veramendi, and the Mission San Antonio de Valero

Isabella Francisca Veramendi de Valero, better known as Bella the Alamo cat, is a calico cat who resides on the Alamo property. Bella is the third Alamo cat.

== Background ==
Two cats lived at the Alamo before Bella. Miss Ruby lived at the site from 1981 to 1986 and Mistress Clara Carmack lived at the Alamo from 1996 to 2014. Both of the former Alamo cats are buried on the on site.

Bella's full name, Isabella Francisca Veramendi de Valero, is a combination of the names of Francita Alavez, Juan Martin de Veramendi, and the Mission San Antonio de Valero, which was the original name for the Alamo. Bella is a calico cat.

== Biography ==
Bella was found at the Presidio la Bahia by the child of its director, after which Bella was given to the employees of the Alamo. According to Ernesto Rodriguez, the caretaker of Bella, Bella was around six weeks old when the employees of the Alamo were asked if they wanted her. On June 18, 2015, the Texas General Land Office released the official name of Bella, who then became the new Alamo cat after around a year after Mistress Clara Carmack died.

In the summer of 2021, Bella fell into a dumpster where she was trapped for several hours. Fiesta medals were sold and a GoFundMe was set up to pay for her expenses. More Fiesta medals were sold on Bella's 10th birthday to pay for her expenses.
