= Bělá Castle =

Ruined castle in the Czech Republic

Coordinates: 49°53′51.23″N 13°16′24.38″E

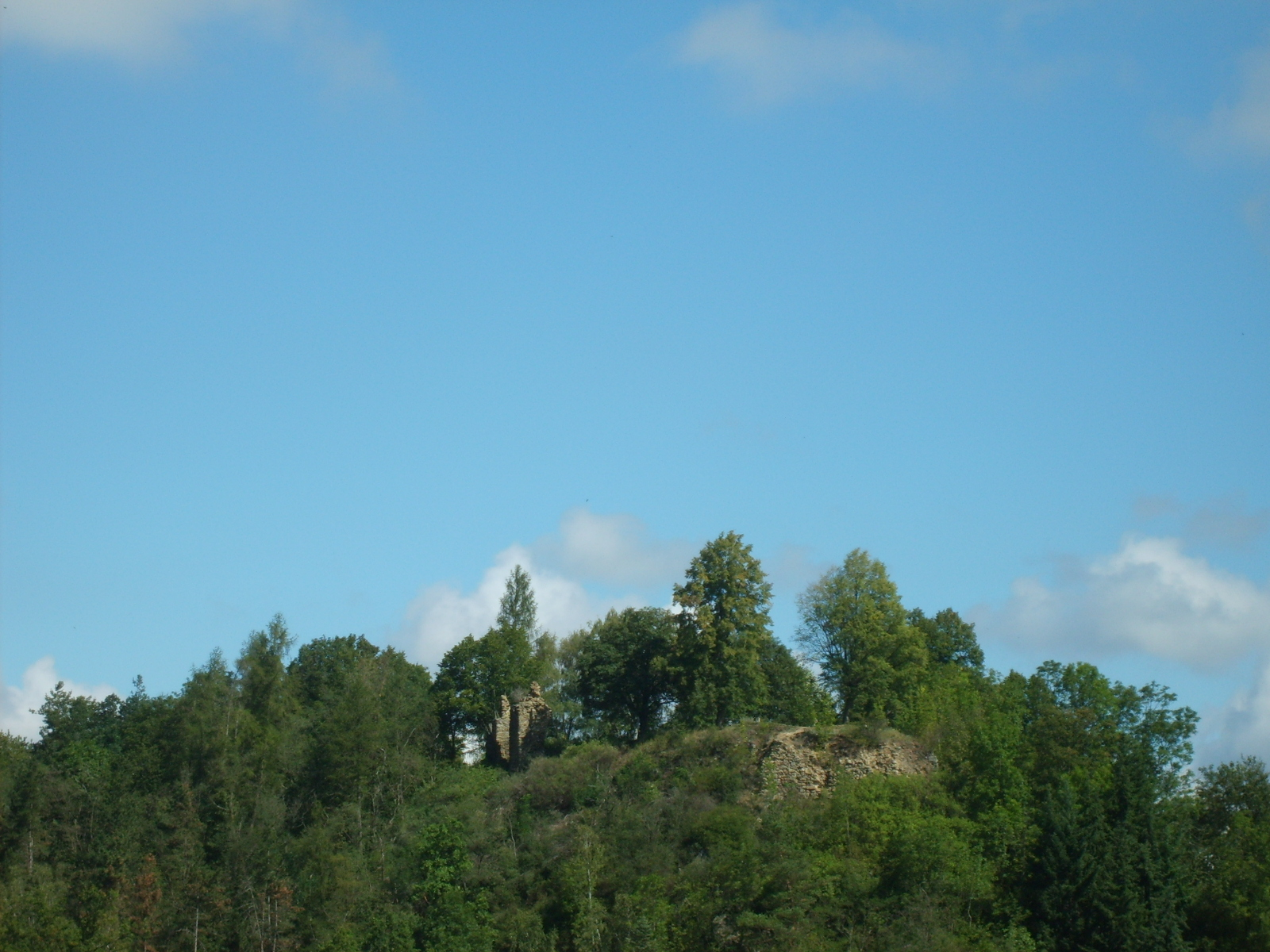
Ruined Bělá Castle above Dolní Bělá

Bělá Castle (Czech: Hrad Dolní Bělá) is a castle located in Dolní Bělá municipality in the Plzeň Region of the Czech Republic. The first mention of the castle comes from somewhere between 1315 and 1318.

== History ==
The castle of Bělá was built between 1313 and 1315 by Racek, a member of the influential Czech house of Hroznata. The village itself was first mentioned in a written document in 1318. The Hroznatas held Bělá until 1415, when they sold it to Neustup and Bavor of Švamberk. The castle was sold or even confiscated several times during 15th century and 16th century. The most notable owners during that time were probably the Gutštejns – Volf of Gutštejn was a robber and the castle was confiscated from him in 1509.

The original heavily fortified castle was rebuilt to a chateau sometimes towards the end of the 16th century, while owned by the family of Markvarts of Hrádek. At that time, the castle had a prominent guest—Kryštof Harant stayed there before he started his journey to the Holy Land.

In 1757, the castle was purchased by the Cistercian monastery of Plasy. After Emperor Joseph II abolished religious orders, the property was managed by the Religious Fund. Around 1785, the local people were allowed to take the castle apart and use the stones to build their own houses.

== See also ==
- List of castles in the Czech Republic
