= Bellas Artes =

Bellas Artes, a Spanish-language term, can refer to:

- Bellas Artes metro station (Caracas), Venezuela
- Bellas Artes metro station (Mexico City), Mexico
- Bellas Artes metro station (Santiago), Chile
- Palacio de Bellas Artes, a cultural center in Mexico City
- Bellas Artes (Mexico City Metrobús), a BRT station in Mexico City
- Fine art, a style of painting popular at the turn of the 19th and 20th century
- Bellas Artes (TV series), an Argentine-Spanish television series
- Centro de Bellas Artes, a cultural center in San Juan, Puerto Rico
- Centro de Bellas Artes de Caguas, a cultural center in Caguas, Puerto Rico

== See also ==
- Beaux arts (disambiguation)
- Museo de Bellas Artes (disambiguation)
