= Benjamin Bellas =

American artist

Benjamin Bellas (born 29 March 1976) is an American artist. He was formerly an adjunct professor at the School of the Art Institute of Chicago.

Through poetic narratives, Bellas unexpectedly relocates autobiographical moments of enmity, longing and uncomfortable honesty in banal visual forms. By transforming everyday objects into sometimes-humorous icons of his most intimate life experiences, his work can be seen as a high-wire balancing act between intellect and emotion that manifests itself as a synthesis of the Humanities.

Benjamin Bellas is a 2007 recipient of an Illinois Arts Council International project grant and has exhibited at 1a space, Hong Kong; Istanbul Exhibition Center, Turkey; Track 16, Los Angeles; Academy of Fine Arts, Helsinki, Finland; Chicago Cultural Center, Chicago; Florean Museum of Contemporary Art, Romania; among many others.
