= Bělá (Havlíčkův Brod District) =

- Municipality
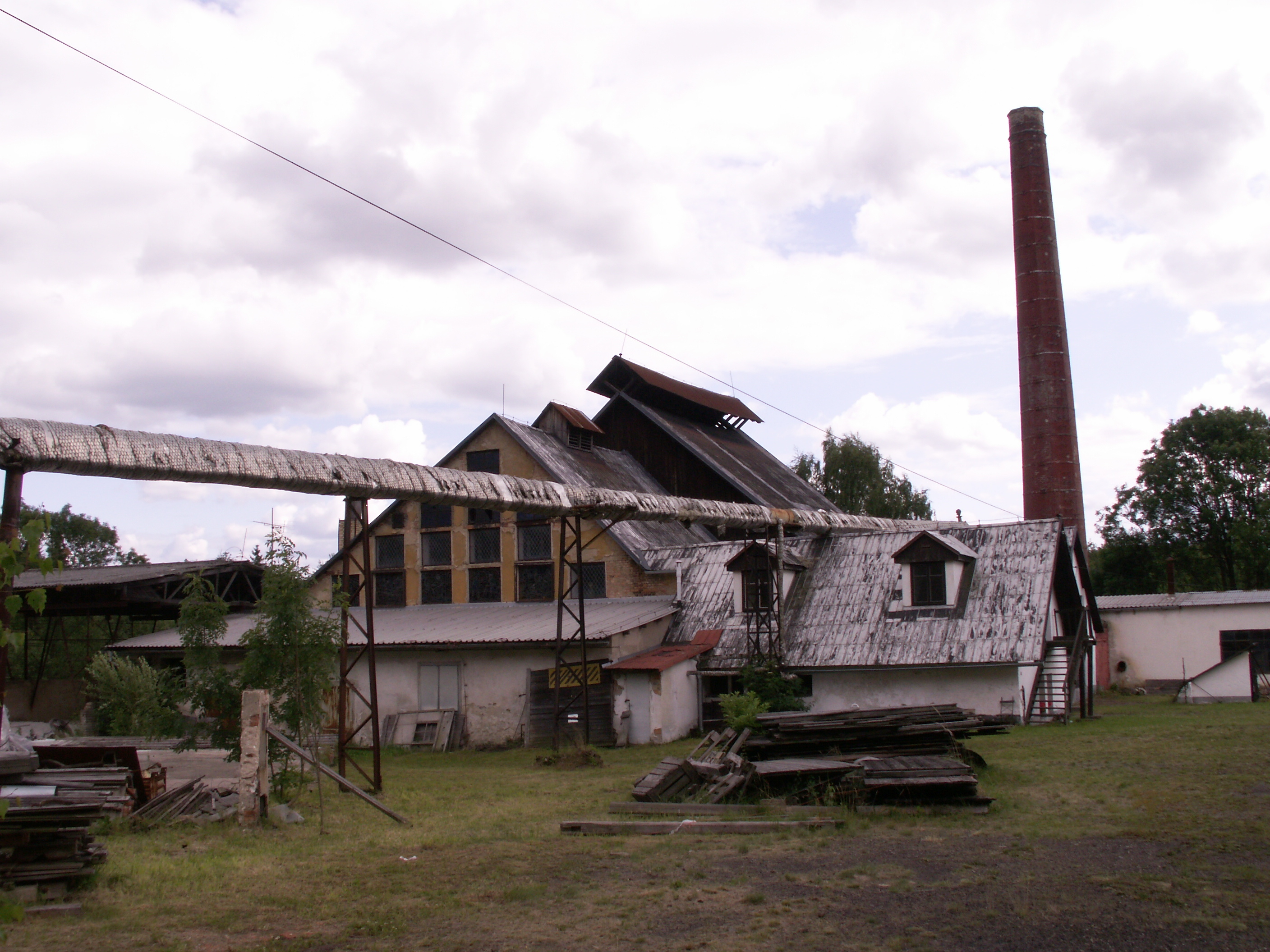
- Jakub Glassworks in Tasice

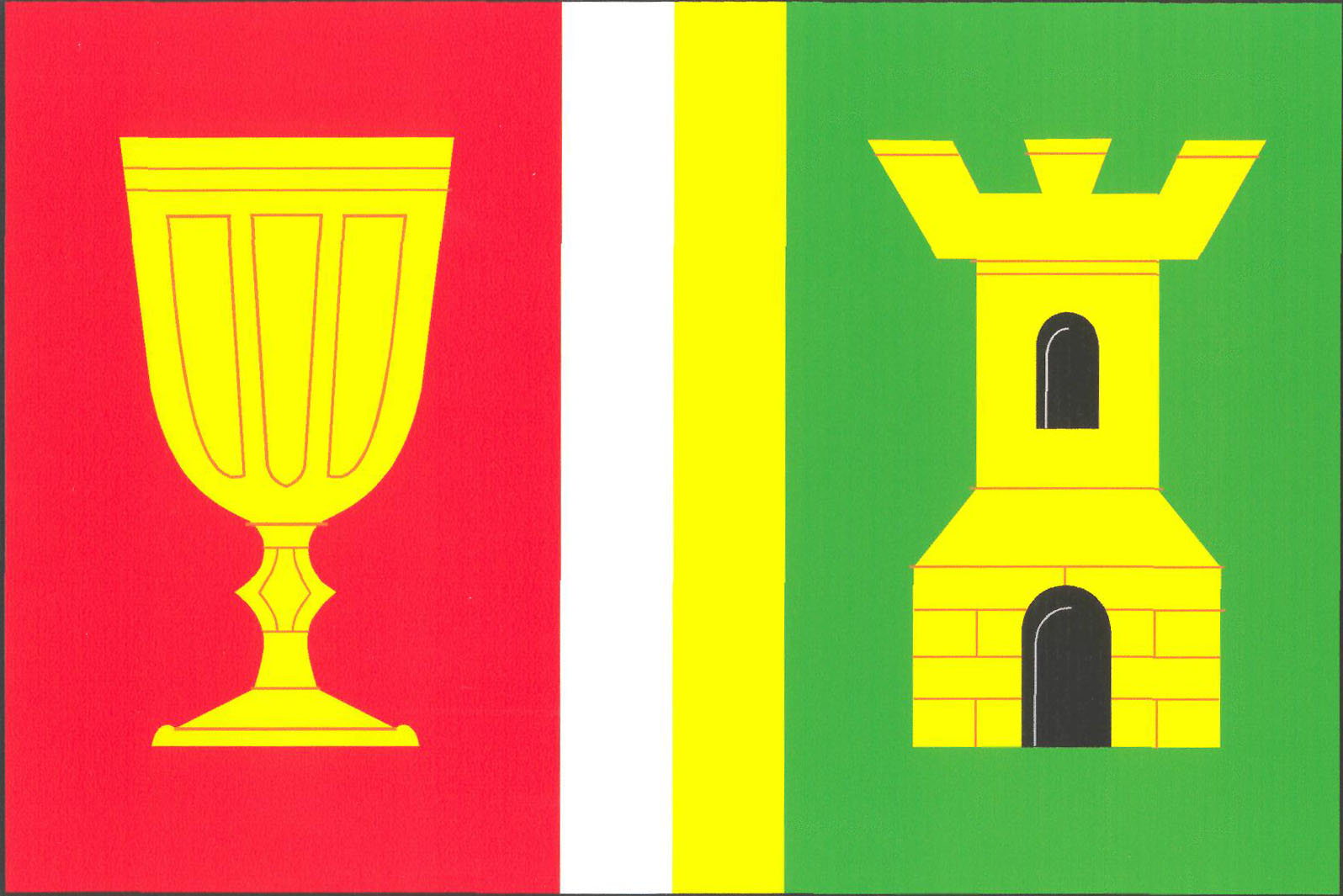
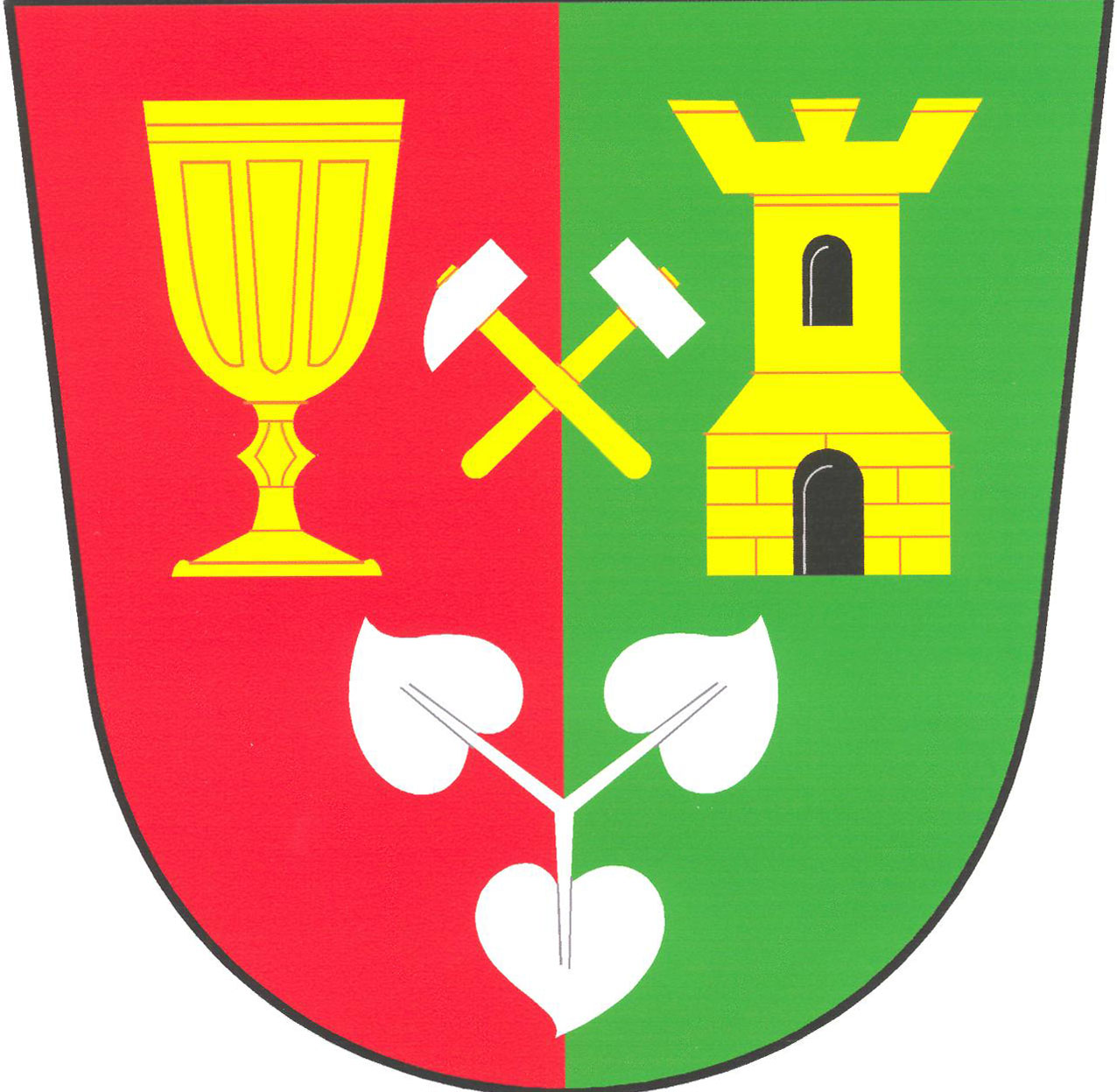
- Flag Coat of arms

- Location in the Czech Republic
- Coordinates: 49°45′8″N 15°14′14″E
- Country: Czech Republic
- Region: Vysočina
- District: Havlíčkův Brod
- First mentioned: 1257

Area
  - Total: 4.07 km^{2} (1.57 sq mi)
- Elevation: 541 m (1,775 ft)

Population (2026-01-01)
  - Total: 221
  - Density: 54.3/km^{2} (141/sq mi)
- Time zone: UTC+1 (CET)
  - Summer (DST): UTC+2 (CEST)
- Postal code: 584 01
- Website: www.belaobec.cz

Bělá (Czech pronunciation: [ˈbjɛlaː]) is a municipality and village in Havlíčkův Brod District in the Vysočina Region of the Czech Republic. It has about 200 inhabitants.

Bělá lies approximately 30 kilometres (19 mi) north-west of Havlíčkův Brod, 47 km (29 mi) north-west of Jihlava, and 70 km (43 mi) south-east of Prague.

== Administrative division ==
Bělá consists of two municipal parts (in brackets population according to the 2021 census):

- Bělá (162)
- Tasice (52)

== Demographics ==
Historical population
Year	Pop.	±%
1869	506	—
1880	538	+6.3%
1890	544	+1.1%
1900	535	−1.7%
1910	484	−9.5%
1921	461	−4.8%
1930	427	−7.4%
1950	301	−29.5%
1961	367	+21.9%
1970	301	−18.0%
1980	279	−7.3%
1991	222	−20.4%
2001	191	−14.0%
2011	207	+8.4%
2021	214	+3.4%
Source: Censuses
