= Remetinec, Varaždin County =

Remetinec is a village near Novi Marof in Varaždin County, Northern Croatia, with a population of 1,477 (2011).
