= Česká Bělá =

- Market town
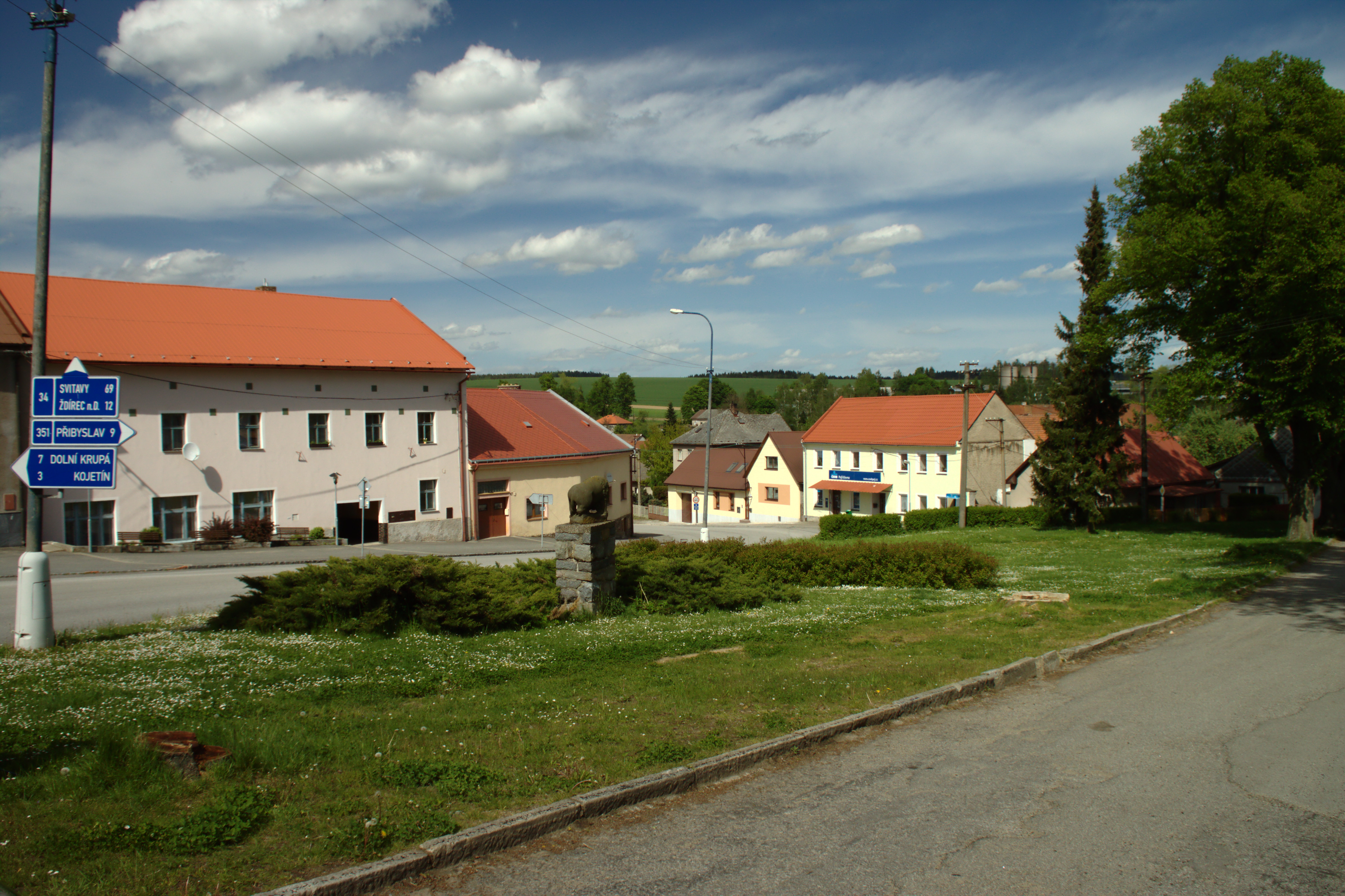
- Centre of Česká Bělá

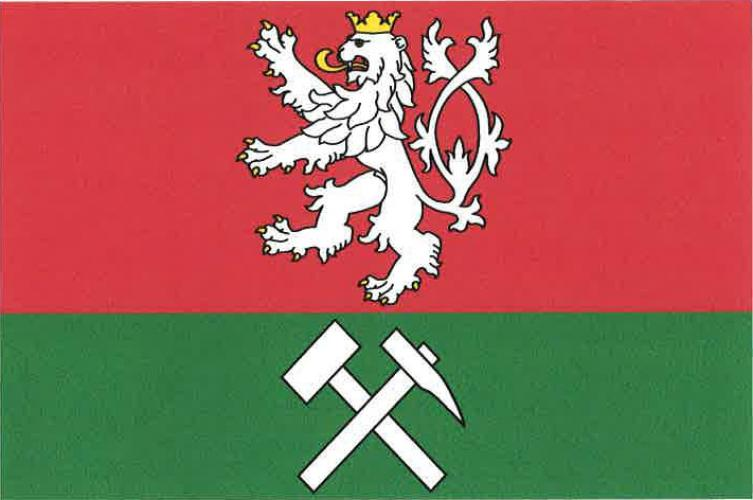
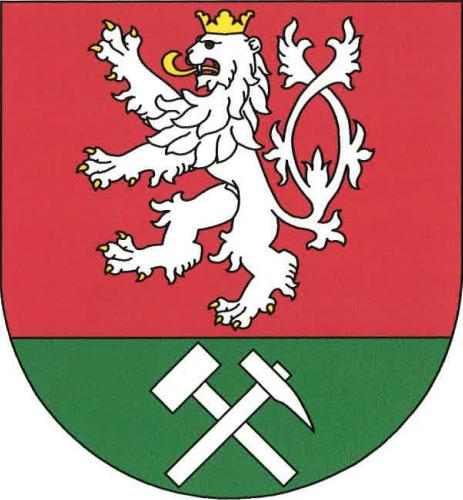
- Flag Coat of arms

- Location in the Czech Republic
- Coordinates: 49°38′35″N 15°41′28″E
- Country: Czech Republic
- Region: Vysočina
- District: Havlíčkův Brod
- First mentioned: 1257

Area
  - Total: 15.99 km^{2} (6.17 sq mi)
- Elevation: 510 m (1,670 ft)

Population (2026-01-01)
  - Total: 1,136
  - Density: 71.04/km^{2} (184.0/sq mi)
- Time zone: UTC+1 (CET)
  - Summer (DST): UTC+2 (CEST)
- Postal codes: 582 61, 583 01
- Website: www.ceskabela.cz

Česká Bělá (Czech pronunciation: [ˈtʃɛskaː ˈbjɛlaː]) is a market town in Havlíčkův Brod District in the Vysočina Region of the Czech Republic. It has about 1,100 inhabitants.

== Administrative division ==
Česká Bělá consists of two municipal parts (in brackets population according to the 2021 census):

- Česká Bělá (980)
- Cibotín (67)

== Etymology ==
The name Bělá was transferred to the settlement from the Bělá Stream. Bělá (from bílá, i.e. 'white') is a common Czech name of watercourses, referring to the colour of the water or their location in a treeless landscape and the reflection of the sun in them. Česká Bělá means 'Bohemian/Czech Bělá'.

== Geography ==
Česká Bělá is located about 8 kilometres (5 mi) northeast of Havlíčkův Brod and 27 km (17 mi) north of Jihlava. It lies in the Upper Sázava Hills. The highest point is at 569 m (1,867 ft) above sea level. The Bělá Stream flows through the market town and supplies two fishponds inside the built-up area.

== History ==
The first written mention of Česká Bělá is from 1257. It was originally a Czech settlement, but after the silver mining developed in the area in the second half of the 13th century, German miners came to Česká Bělá and settled here. In 1278, the village was promoted to a town. After the silver reserves were exhausted, the German settlers left. In the 16th century, Česká Bělá was owned by the Pernštejn family. From 1599 to 1731, it was a property of the town of Německý Brod.

== Demographics ==
Historical population

Year	Pop.	±%
1869	1,370	—
1880	1,336	−2.5%
1890	1,317	−1.4%
1900	1,345	+2.1%
1910	1,386	+3.0%

Year	Pop.	±%
1921	1,312	−5.3%
1930	1,174	−10.5%
1950	985	−16.1%
1961	1,005	+2.0%
1970	1,019	+1.4%

Year	Pop.	±%
1980	934	−8.3%
1991	891	−4.6%
2001	921	+3.4%
2011	974	+5.8%
2021	1,047	+7.5%

Source: Censuses

== Transport ==
The I/34 road (the section from Havlíčkův Brod to Svitavy) runs through the municipality.

== Sights ==
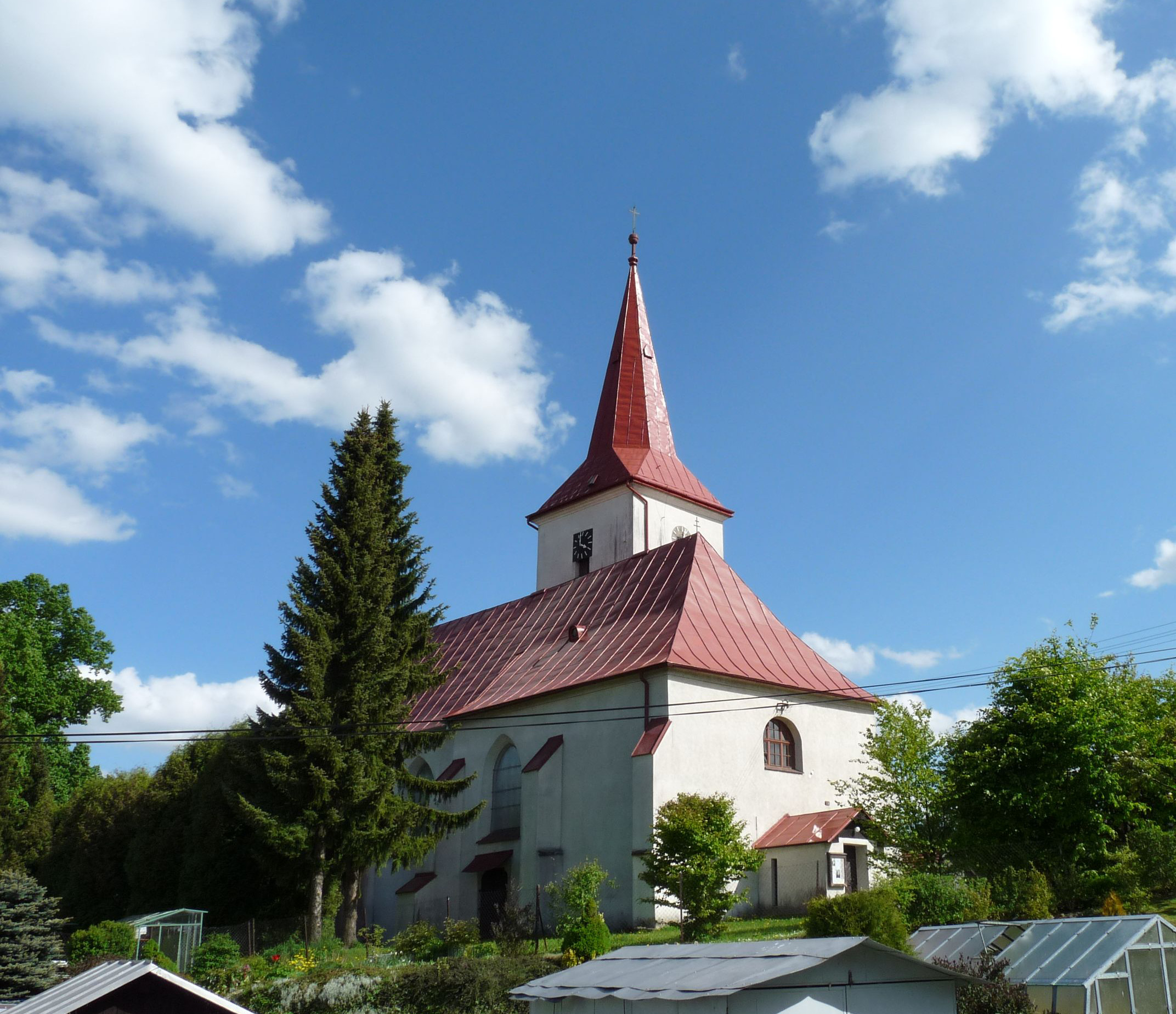
Church of Saint Bartholomew

The main landmark of Česká Bělá is the Church of Saint Bartholomew. Originally a late Gothic church from the 14th century, it was rebuilt in the Baroque style in 1700 and 1734.
