= Bela biscuit =

Traditional biscuit at afternoon tea in Bangladesh

- Course: Afternoon tea
- Place of origin: Chittagong, Bangladesh
- Region or state: Greater Chittagong
- Associated cuisine: Bangladesh
- Main ingredients: Milk, butter, baking powder, flour

Bela biscuit (Bengali: বেলা বিস্কুট) is a traditional round cookie baked in Chittagong, Bangladesh. It is sometimes dunked in tea.

== Ingredients ==
Bela biscuits are made from flour, sugar, baking soda and other, secret ingredients. Other ingredients that can be added are milk, salt, egg, yeast, cinnamon powder and fennel powder.

== Gani Bakery ==
Gani Bakery is a bakery at Chandanpura in Chittagong founded in 1880s by Abdul Gani Showdagar which is still notable for its Bela biscuits. According to many, Gani was the first to introduce Bela biscuit in Chittagong. In 1945, Gani declared the bakery a Waqf property.
