= Rohovládova Bělá =

- Municipality
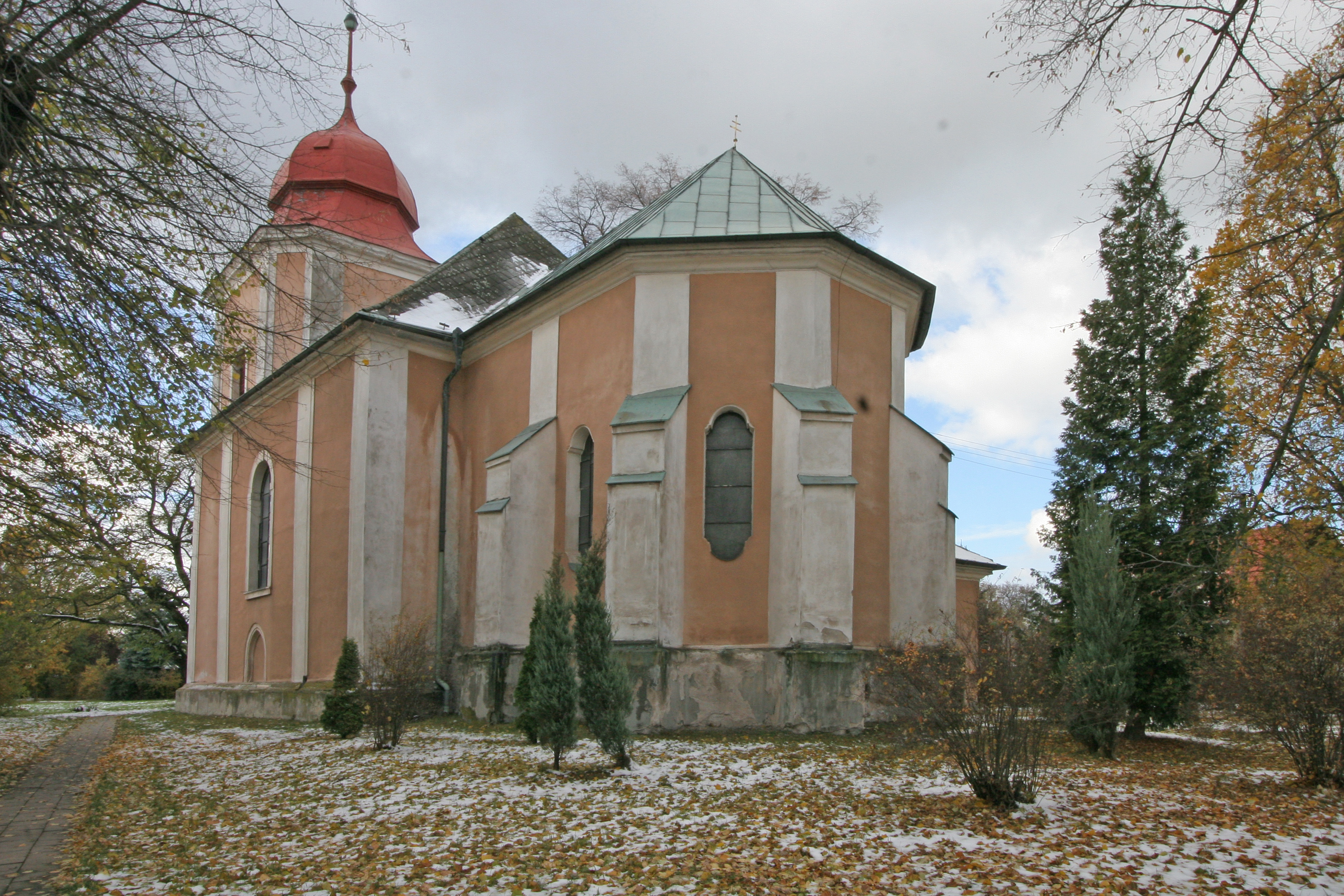
- Church of Saints Peter and Paul

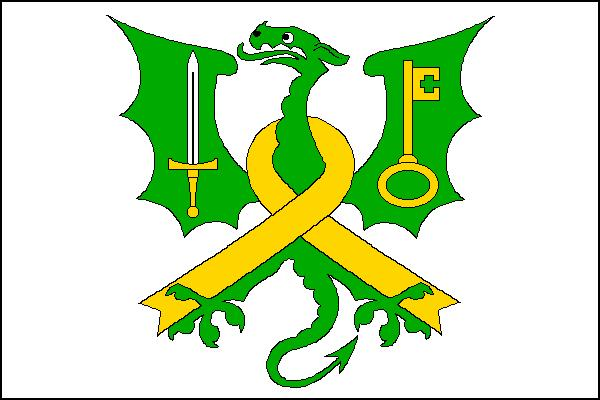
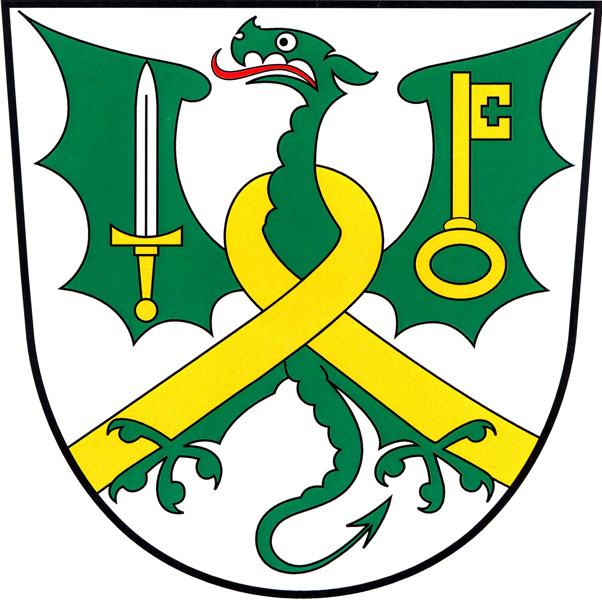
- Flag Coat of arms

- Location in the Czech Republic
- Coordinates: 50°6′23″N 15°36′22″E
- Country: Czech Republic
- Region: Pardubice
- District: Pardubice
- First mentioned: 1282

Area
  - Total: 4.43 km^{2} (1.71 sq mi)
- Elevation: 263 m (863 ft)

Population (2026-01-01)
  - Total: 674
  - Density: 152/km^{2} (394/sq mi)
- Time zone: UTC+1 (CET)
  - Summer (DST): UTC+2 (CEST)
- Postal code: 533 43
- Website: www.rohovladovabela.cz

Rohovládova Bělá is a municipality and village in Pardubice District in the Pardubice Region of the Czech Republic. It has about 600 inhabitants.

== History ==
The first written mention of Bělá is from 1282, when a wooden chapel building had been set up here. The area was owned by the Bukůvka family. In 1375, their land was divided among five brothers and Bělá became property of Rohovlád Bukůvka. The village was named Bělá until 1923, when it got renamed to Rohovládova Bělá as result of a request by municipal councilors.

== Demographics ==
Historical population
Year	Pop.	±%
1869	452	—
1880	489	+8.2%
1890	496	+1.4%
1900	457	−7.9%
1910	503	+10.1%
1921	490	−2.6%
1930	550	+12.2%
1950	462	−16.0%
1961	483	+4.5%
1970	403	−16.6%
1980	403	+0.0%
1991	429	+6.5%
2001	436	+1.6%
2011	534	+22.5%
2021	592	+10.9%
Source: Censuses
