= Bělá u Jevíčka =

- Municipality
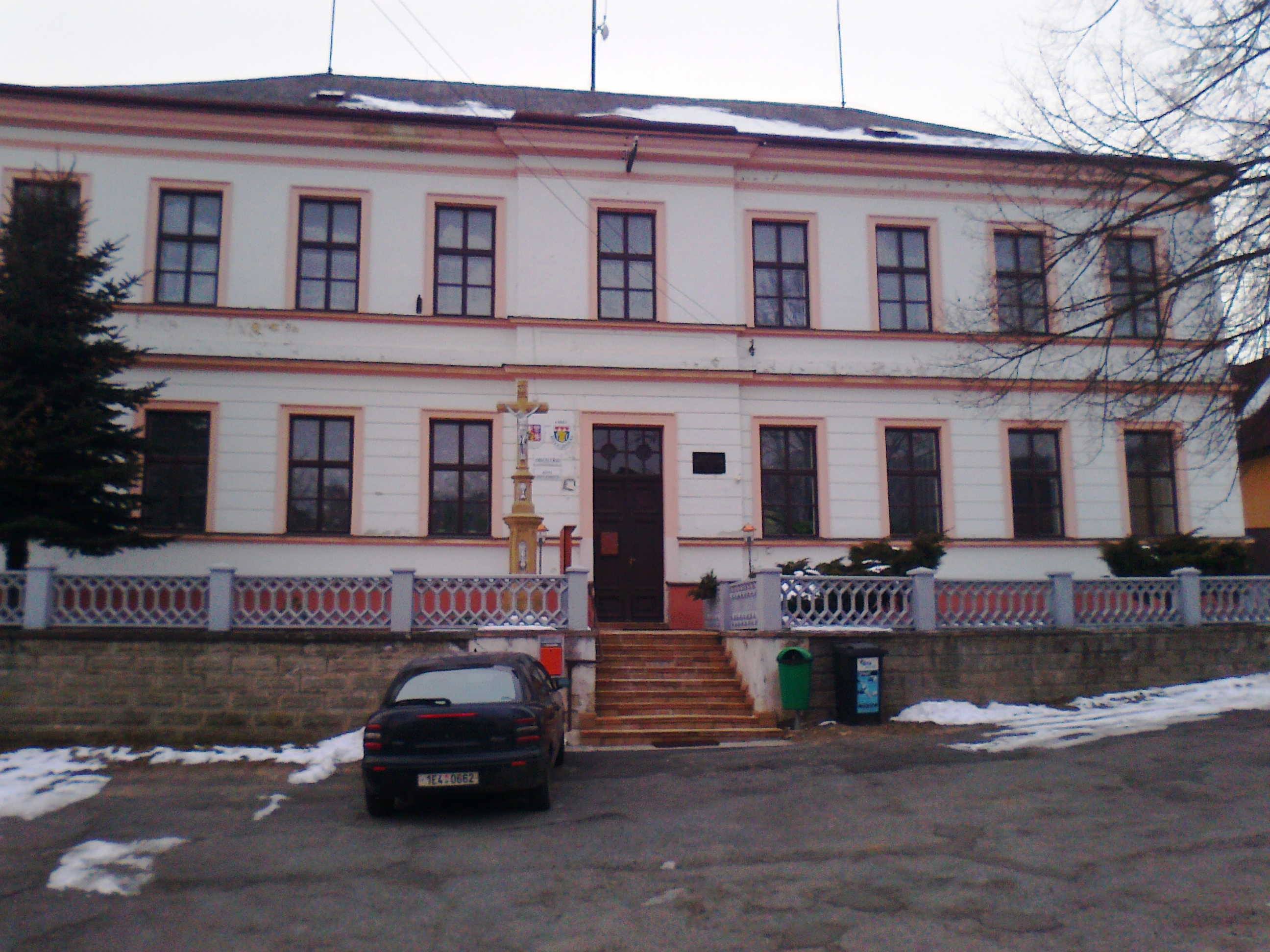
- Municipal office

- Flag Coat of arms

- Location in the Czech Republic
- Coordinates: 49°38′22″N 16°38′45″E
- Country: Czech Republic
- Region: Pardubice
- District: Svitavy
- First mentioned: 1258

Area
  - Total: 9.69 km^{2} (3.74 sq mi)
- Elevation: 396 m (1,299 ft)

Population (2026-01-01)
  - Total: 345
  - Density: 35.6/km^{2} (92.2/sq mi)
- Time zone: UTC+1 (CET)
  - Summer (DST): UTC+2 (CEST)
- Postal code: 569 43
- Website: www.belaujev.net

Bělá u Jevíčka (German: Albendorf) is a municipality and village in Svitavy District in the Pardubice Region of the Czech Republic. It has about 300 inhabitants.

== Administrative division ==
Bělá u Jevíčka consists of two municipal parts (in brackets population according to the 2021 census):

- Bělá u Jevíčka (276)
- Smolná (55)

== Geography ==
Bělá u Jevíčka is located about 18 kilometres (11 mi) southeast of Svitavy and 47 km (29 mi) north of Brno. It lies in the southern tip of the Orlické Foothills. The highest point is the hill Za Lomem at 560 m (1,840 ft) above sea level. The stream Malonínský potok flows through the municipality.

== History ==
The first written mention of Bělá u Jevíčka is from 1258. In 1396, the village was acquired by Sulík of Radkov, who immediately sold it to the Augustinian monastery in Jevíčko.

== Demographics ==
Historical population

Year	Pop.	±%
1869	828	—
1880	768	−7.2%
1890	848	+10.4%
1900	854	+0.7%
1910	881	+3.2%

Year	Pop.	±%
1921	892	+1.2%
1930	852	−4.5%
1950	630	−26.1%
1961	642	+1.9%
1970	560	−12.8%

Year	Pop.	±%
1980	476	−15.0%
1991	395	−17.0%
2001	380	−3.8%
2011	355	−6.6%
2021	331	−6.8%

Source: Censuses

== Transport ==
There are no railways or major roads passing through the municipality.

== Sights ==
There are no protected cultural monuments in the municipality, only a part of the protected area of the sanatorium in neighbouring Jevíčko extends there marginally.
