= Bělá (Semily District) =

- Municipality
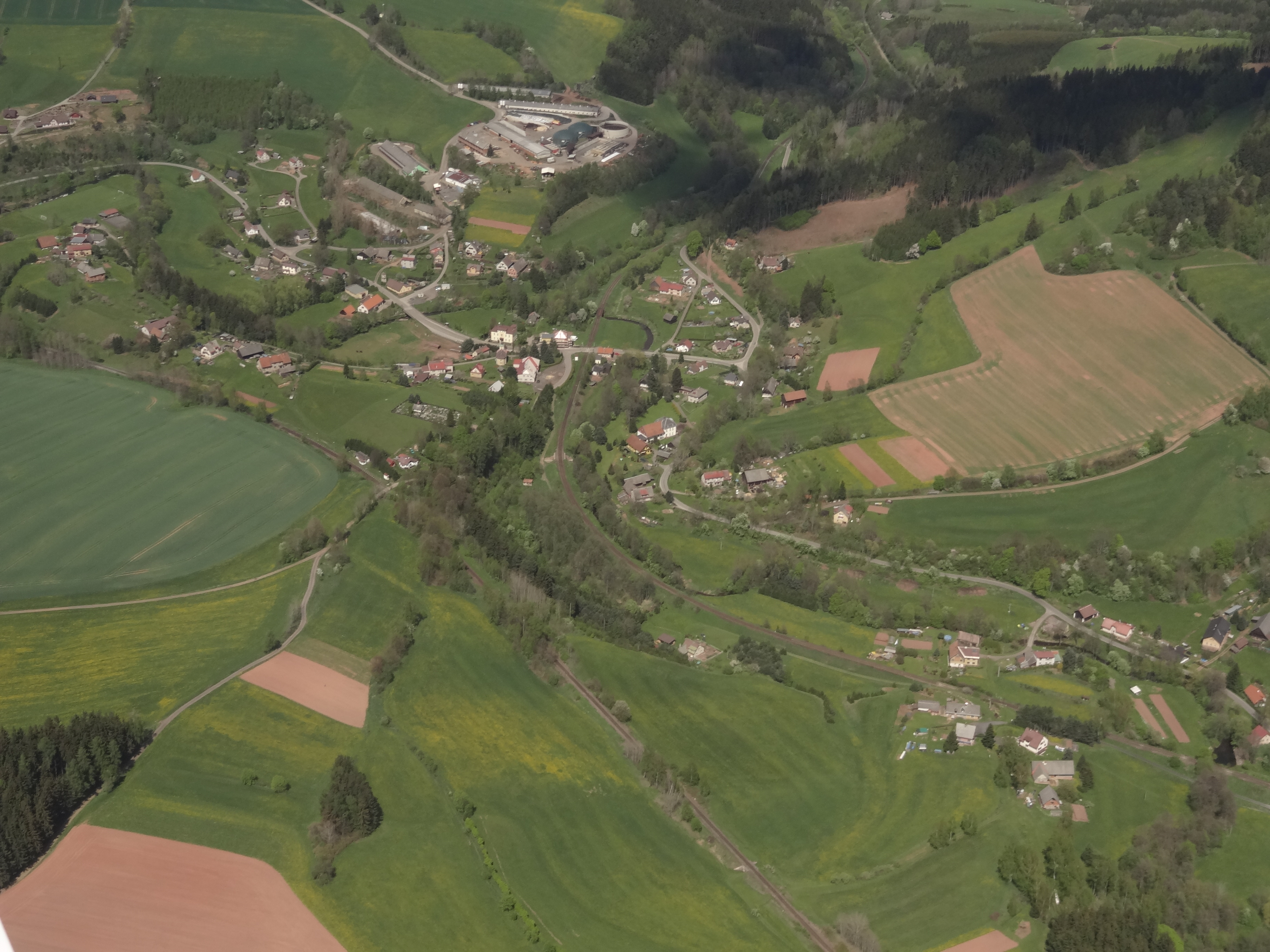
- Aerial view

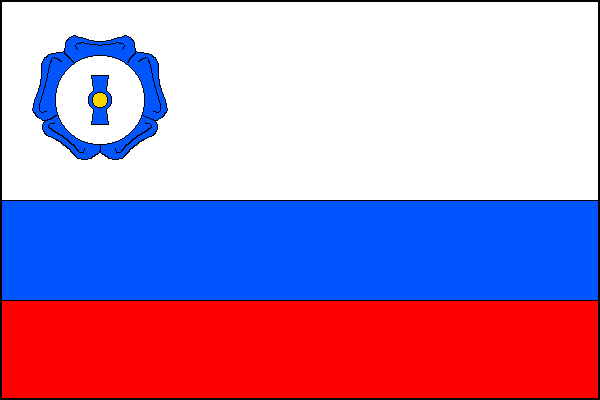
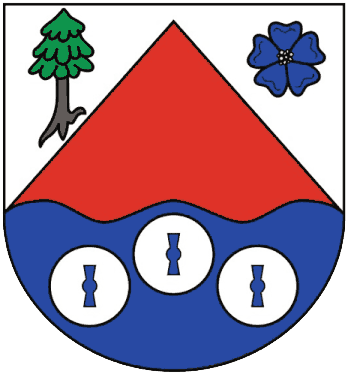
- Flag Coat of arms

- Location in the Czech Republic
- Coordinates: 50°32′2″N 15°26′42″E
- Country: Czech Republic
- Region: Liberec
- District: Semily
- First mentioned: 1542

Area
  - Total: 7.76 km^{2} (3.00 sq mi)
- Elevation: 378 m (1,240 ft)

Population (2026-01-01)
  - Total: 280
  - Density: 36/km^{2} (93/sq mi)
- Time zone: UTC+1 (CET)
  - Summer (DST): UTC+2 (CEST)
- Postal code: 514 01
- Website: www.belasm.cz

Bělá is a municipality and village in Semily District in the Liberec Region of the Czech Republic. It has about 300 inhabitants.

== Demographics ==
Historical population
Year	Pop.	±%
1869	847	—
1880	868	+2.5%
1890	822	−5.3%
1900	747	−9.1%
1910	762	+2.0%
1921	665	−12.7%
1930	651	−2.1%
1950	432	−33.6%
1961	413	−4.4%
1970	334	−19.1%
1980	304	−9.0%
1991	278	−8.6%
2001	256	−7.9%
2011	251	−2.0%
2021	260	+3.6%
Source: Censuses
