= Bělá (Mírová pod Kozákovem) =

- Village
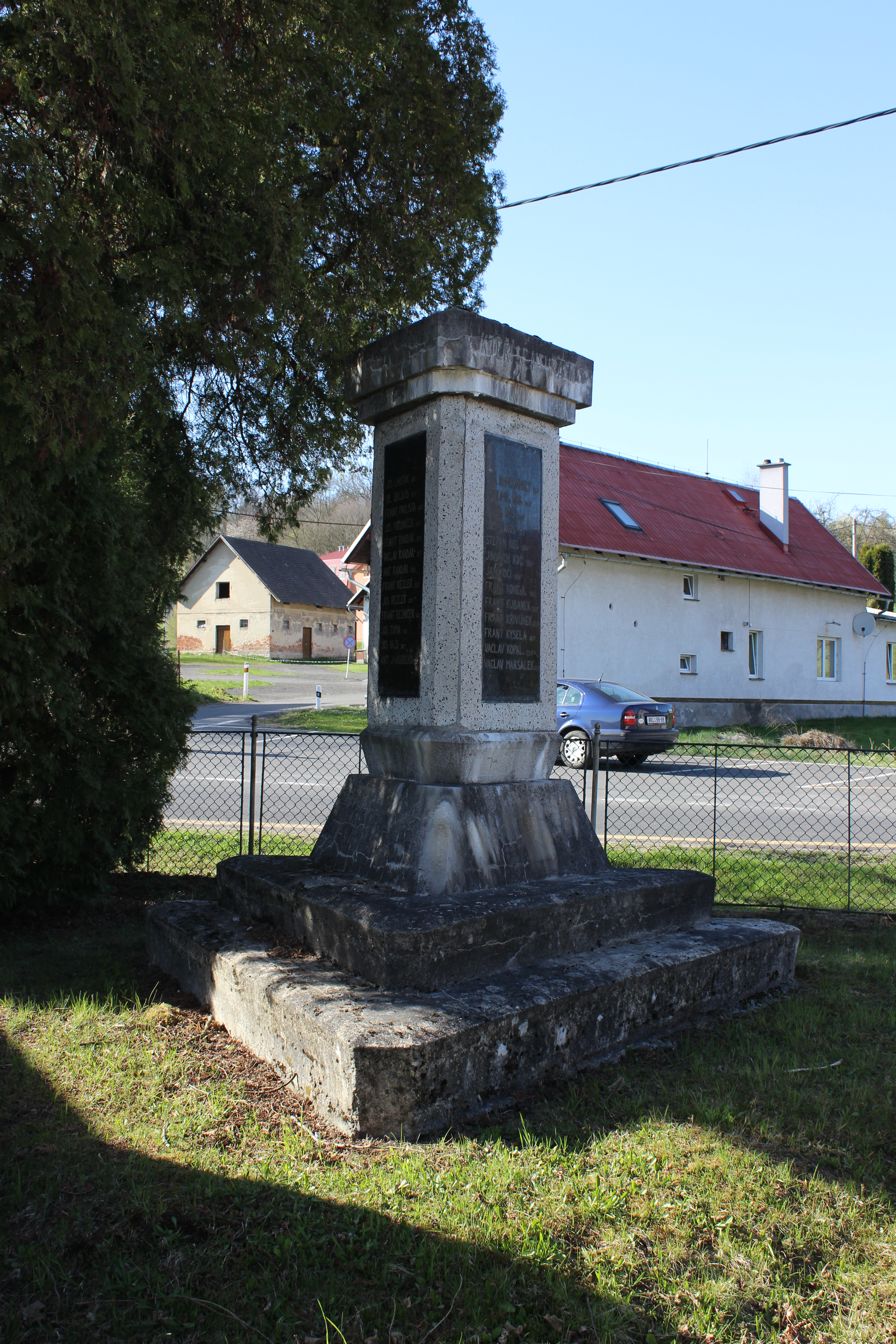
- Memorial to the Fallen

- Location in the Czech Republic
- Coordinates: 50°35′31″N 15°11′2″E
- Country: Czech Republic
- Region: Liberec
- District: Semily
- Municipality: Mírová pod Kozákovem

Area
  - Total: 1.29 km^{2} (0.50 sq mi)

Population (2011)
  - Total: 270

Bělá is a village and administrative part of Mírová pod Kozákovem in Semily District in the Liberec Region of the Czech Republic. It used to be an independent municipality before the formation of Mírová pod Kozákovem. The village lies just next to Turnov.

== History ==
The village was first mentioned in 1322.

In Bělá, there is a school, firehouse, roadside cafe, village shop, fire suppression pond, and swimming pool shop.

== Záholice ==
The hamlet Záholice is a part of the municipal parts of Bělá and Rohliny. It is a basic settlement unit with 70 addresses registered in its territory. In 2011, 176 people lived here permanently. The area of Záholice is 70.5 ha (174 acres).
