= Bella (German magazine) =

German women's magazine

- Categories: Women's magazine
- Frequency: Weekly
- First issue: 6 March 1978
- Company: Bauer Media Group
- Country: Germany
- Based in: Hamburg
- Language: German
- Website: www.bella.de

Bella is a German women's weekly magazine.

== History ==
It was first published in March 1978.

Bella's focus is on information and advice on topics such as beauty, wellness, health, fashion, living, travel, psychology and relationships. A large entertainment section also includes reports, short stories and puzzles. There are also several recipes in the magazine.

== Circulation statistics ==
According to IVW, the average paid circulation in the fourth quarter of 2014 was 94,472 copies. This is 8,992 fewer copies per issue (-8.69 %) than in the same quarter of the previous year. The number of subscribers fell by 1,064 within a year to an average of 11,713 per issue (-8.33 %); this means that around 12.4 % of readers subscribed to the magazine.
