= Bill Bellas =

English footballer

Personal information
- Full name: William Joseph Bellas
- Date of birth: 21 May 1925
- Place of birth: Great Crosby, England
- Date of death: 1994 (aged 68–69)
- Height: 6 ft 0 in (1.83 m)
- Position: Defender

Senior career*
Years	Team	Apps	(Gls)
1944–1945	Marine		
1945–1946	Notts County	0	(0)
1946	Grimsby Town	0	(0)
1946–1948	Nottingham Forest	0	(0)
1948	Mansfield Town	0	(0)
1948–1951	Southport	88	(0)
1951–1952	Grimsby Town	5	(0)
1952–195?	Barry Town		
- * Club domestic league appearances and goals

William Joseph Bellas (21 May 1925 – 1994) was an English professional footballer who played as a defender.
