= Bělá (Pelhřimov District) =

- Municipality
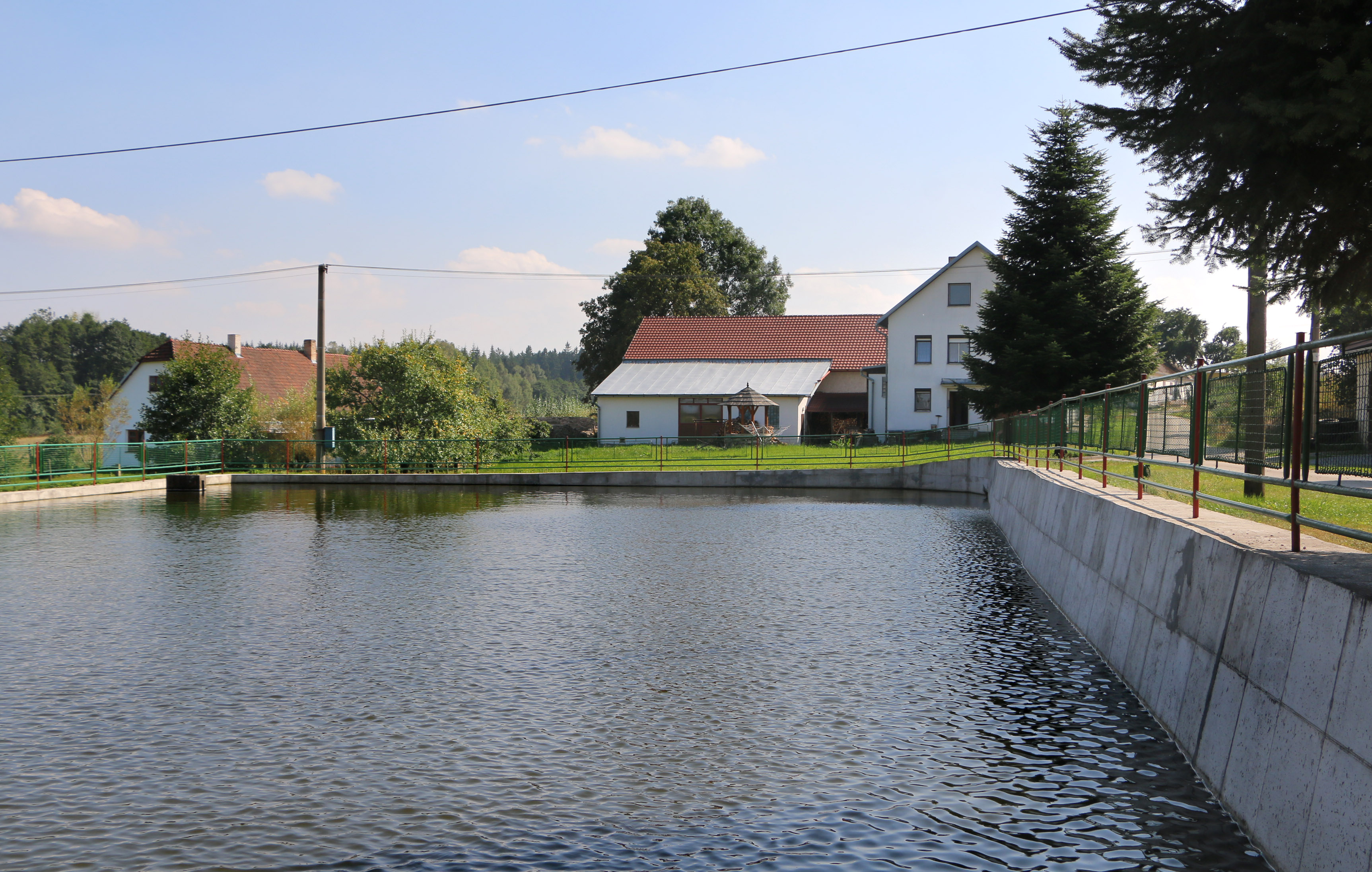
- Centre of Bělá

- Location in the Czech Republic
- Coordinates: 49°18′45″N 15°15′38″E
- Country: Czech Republic
- Region: Vysočina
- District: Pelhřimov
- First mentioned: 1392

Area
  - Total: 3.31 km^{2} (1.28 sq mi)
- Elevation: 681 m (2,234 ft)

Population (2026-01-01)
  - Total: 60
  - Density: 18/km^{2} (47/sq mi)
- Time zone: UTC+1 (CET)
  - Summer (DST): UTC+2 (CEST)
- Postal code: 393 01
- Website: www.bela-obec.cz

Bělá is a municipality and village in Pelhřimov District in the Vysočina Region of the Czech Republic. It has about 60 inhabitants.

== Etymology ==
The name was transferred to the village from the Bělá Stream. Bělá (from bílá, i.e. 'white') is a common Czech name of watercourses, referring to the colour of the water or their location in a treeless landscape and the reflection of the sun in them.

== Geography ==
Bělá is located about 13 kilometres (8 mi) south of Pelhřimov and 25 km (16 mi) southwest of Jihlava. It lies in the Křemešník Highlands. The highest point is the hill Bělský kopec at 709 m (2,326 ft) above sea level. The Bělá Stream originates here and supplies a system of three small fishponds.

== History ==
The first written mention of Bělá is from 1392.

== Demographics ==
Historical population

| Year | Pop. | ±% |
|---|---|---|
| 1869 | 215 | — |
| 1880 | 235 | +9.3% |
| 1890 | 197 | −16.2% |
| 1900 | 202 | +2.5% |
| 1910 | 203 | +0.5% |

| Year | Pop. | ±% |
|---|---|---|
| 1921 | 182 | −10.3% |
| 1930 | 170 | −6.6% |
| 1950 | 133 | −21.8% |
| 1961 | 115 | −13.5% |
| 1970 | 85 | −26.1% |

| Year | Pop. | ±% |
|---|---|---|
| 1980 | 60 | −29.4% |
| 1991 | 44 | −26.7% |
| 2001 | 47 | +6.8% |
| 2011 | 54 | +14.9% |
| 2021 | 47 | −13.0% |

Source: Censuses

== Transport ==
There are no railways or major roads passing through the municipality.

== Sights ==
There are no protected cultural monuments in the municipality.
