= Ključ, Varaždin County =

Ključ
- Village
- Location within Croatia
- Coordinates: 46°10′06″N 16°21′38″E
- Country: Croatia
- County: Varaždin County
- Municipality: Novi Marof

Area
  - Total: 6.0 km^{2} (2.3 sq mi)

Population (2021)
  - Total: 775
  - Density: 130/km^{2} (330/sq mi)
- Time zone: UTC+1 (CET)
  - Summer (DST): UTC+2 (CEST)

Ključ is a village in Varaždin County in northern Croatia.
