= Bela, Varaždin County =

Bela
- town
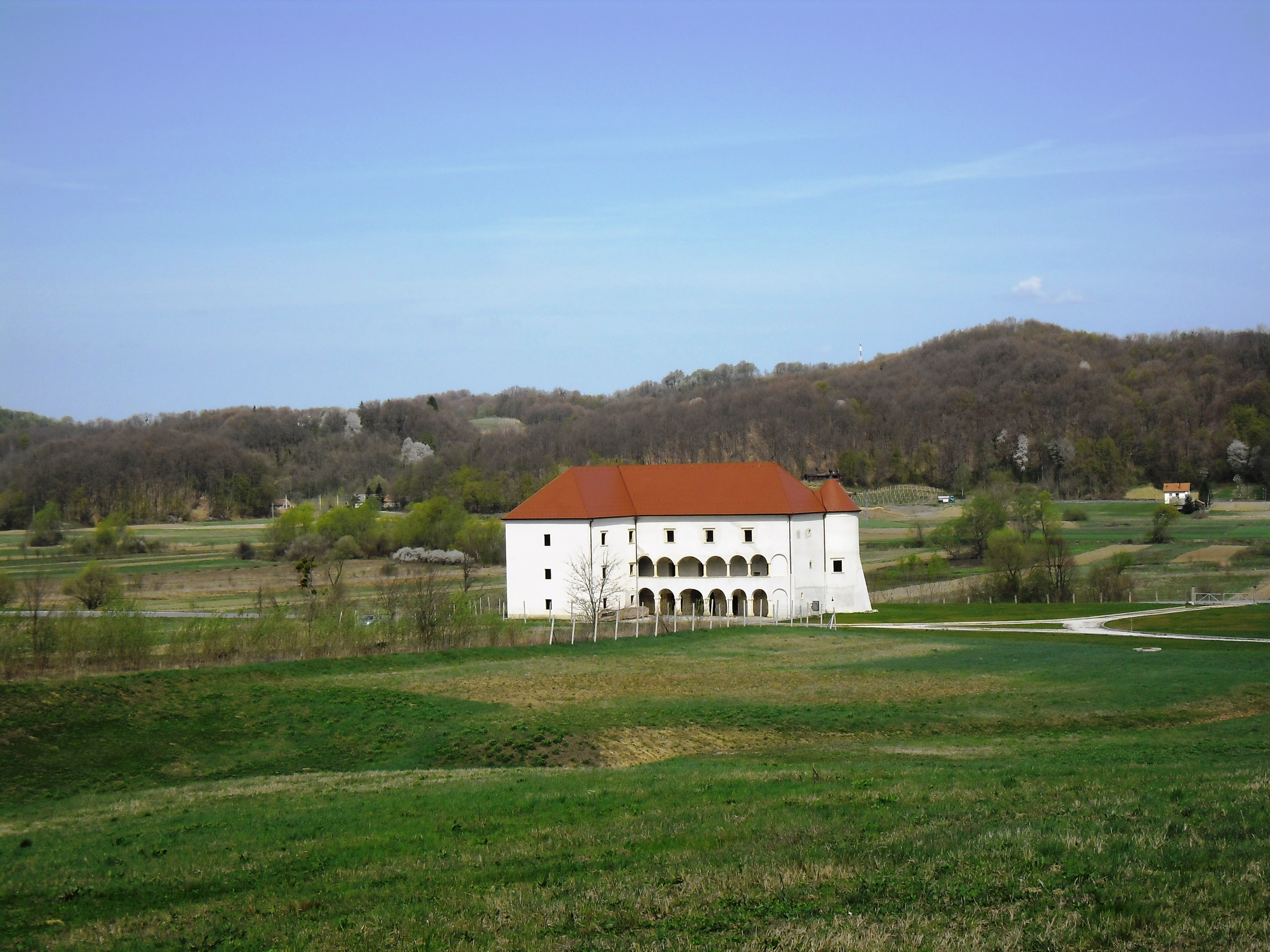
- Castle of Bela

- Location within Croatia
- Country: Croatia
- County: Varaždin County
- Municipality: Novi Marof

Area
  - Total: 2.3 km^{2} (0.89 sq mi)

Population (2021)
  - Total: 54
  - Density: 23/km^{2} (61/sq mi)
- Time zone: UTC+1 (CET)
  - Summer (DST): UTC+2 (CEST)

Bela is a village in Varaždin County of northern Croatia.
