= Jack Bellas =

English footballer

Personal information
- Full name: John Edward Bellas
- Date of birth: 16 September 1895
- Place of birth: Bishop Auckland, England
- Date of death: 1977 (aged 81–82)
- Position: Full-back

Senior career*
Years	Team	Apps	(Gls)
1919–1920	Shildon Athletic		
1920–1923	Sheffield Wednesday	45	(0)
1923–1924	Mansfield Town		
1924–1926	Coventry City	33	(0)
1926–1927	Heanor Town		
1927–1928	Sutton Junction		
1928–1929	Peasley College		
1929	New Houghton Church		
Total		78	(0)
- * Club domestic league appearances and goals

John Edward Bellas (16 September 1895 – 1977) was an English footballer who played in the Football League for Coventry City and Sheffield Wednesday.
