= Horní Bělá =

- Municipality
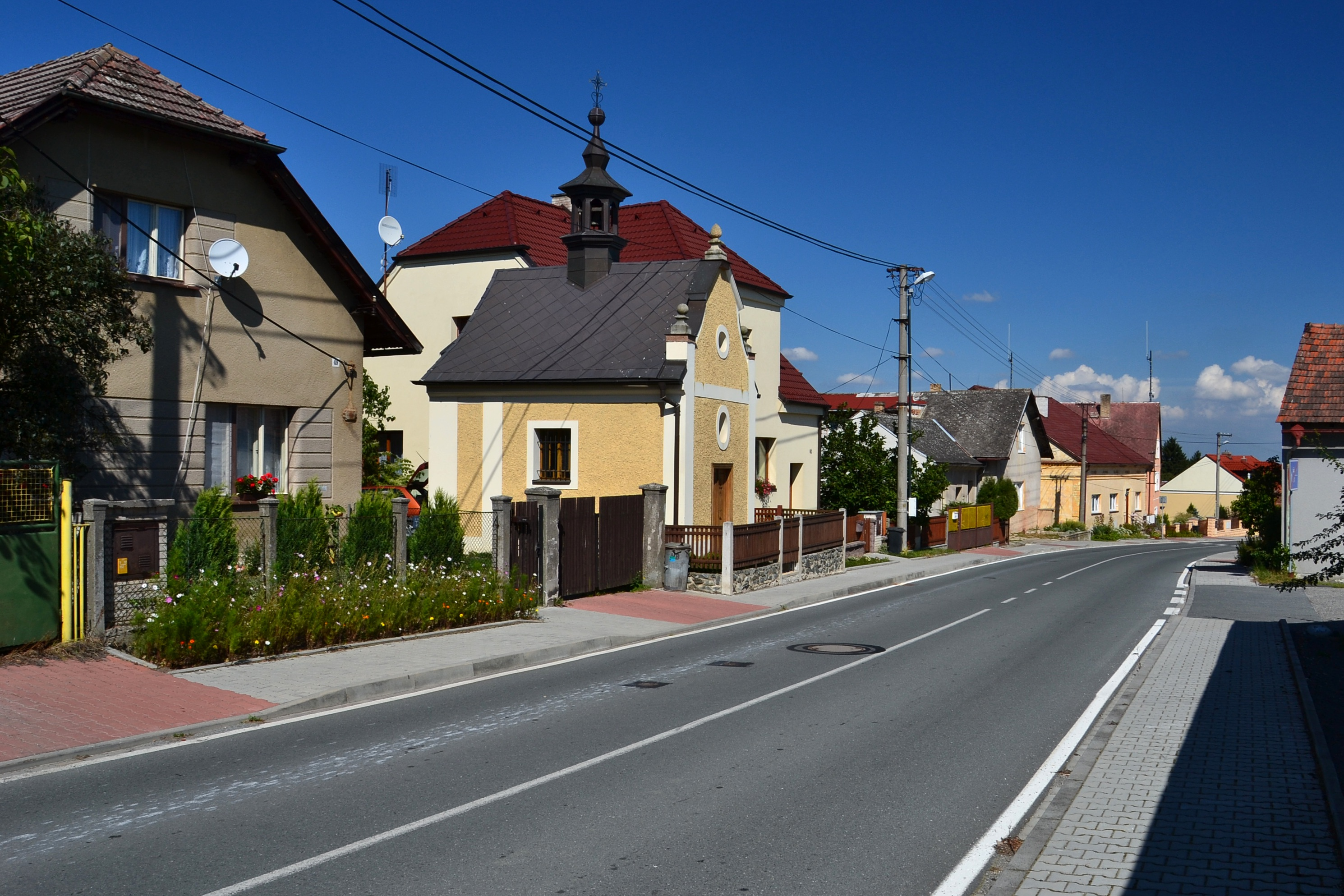
- Centre of Horní Bělá

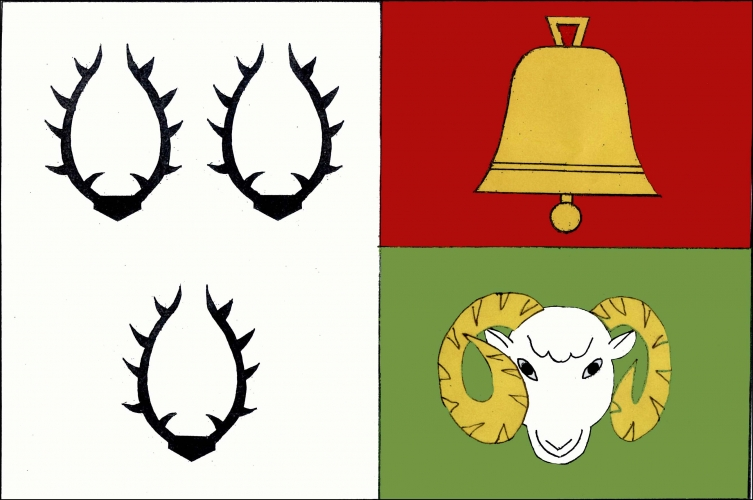
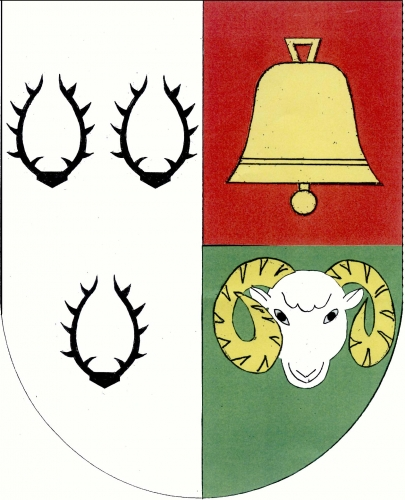
- Flag Coat of arms

- Location in the Czech Republic
- Coordinates: 49°53′21″N 13°15′51″E
- Country: Czech Republic
- Region: Plzeň
- District: Plzeň-North
- First mentioned: 1318

Area
  - Total: 18.40 km^{2} (7.10 sq mi)
- Elevation: 513 m (1,683 ft)

Population (2026-01-01)
  - Total: 585
  - Density: 31.8/km^{2} (82.3/sq mi)
- Time zone: UTC+1 (CET)
  - Summer (DST): UTC+2 (CEST)
- Postal code: 331 52
- Website: www.hornibela.cz

Horní Bělá (German: Ober Biela) is a municipality and village in Plzeň-North District in the Plzeň Region of the Czech Republic. It has about 600 inhabitants.

Horní Bělá lies approximately 18 kilometres (11 mi) north-west of Plzeň and 87 kilometres (54 mi) west of Prague.

== Administrative division ==
Horní Bělá consists of three municipal parts (in brackets population according to the 2021 census):

- Horní Bělá (378)
- Hubenov (77)
- Tlucná (113)

== Demographics ==
Historical population
Year	Pop.	±%
1869	782	—
1880	925	+18.3%
1890	912	−1.4%
1900	886	−2.9%
1910	932	+5.2%
1921	881	−5.5%
1930	939	+6.6%
1950	677	−27.9%
1961	691	+2.1%
1970	690	−0.1%
1980	624	−9.6%
1991	551	−11.7%
2001	553	+0.4%
2011	554	+0.2%
2021	568	+2.5%
Source: Censuses
