= Black Entertainment and Sports Lawyers Association =

- Abbreviation: BESLA
- Formation: 1980
- Purpose: "BESLA is an international organization of lawyers and other entertainment and sports industry executives that supports a more diversified, expert and informed group of entertainment and sports industry professionals."
- Headquarters: Fort Washington, Maryland
- Members: >2,000
- Chairman of the Board: Lawrence C. Hinkle II
- Website: http://www.besla.org/

The Black Entertainment and Sports Lawyers Association, usually abbreviated as BESLA, is a professional organization of attorneys along with sports and entertainment executives of color to provide continuing education and other support services to its members.

== Organization ==
BESLA's headquarters is in Fort Washington, Maryland. Lawrence C. Hinkle II serves as chairman of the board and Khadijah Sharif-Drinkard serves as president.

== History ==
In 1980, during the first annual Black Music Association Conference in Philadelphia, Pennsylvania, a group of prominent African-American attorneys determined that there was a need for a support organization to help individuals survive in a competitive marketplace. This led to the development of the Black Entertainment Lawyers Association (BELA), later that year. One of the founding members was the late David McCoy Franklin, a pioneering African-American entertainment attorney who had represented such talents as Donny Hathaway, Louis Gossett Jr. and Richard Pryor. He would serve as the first chairman of the organization. As African-Americans began to make inroads into sports representation, the name of the organization was changed to the Black Entertainment and Sports Lawyers Association (BESLA) in 1986.

As of 2018, the organization has over 2,000 members. Each year, BESLA holds a conference on entertainment and sports representation.
