= D3 road (Croatia) =

State road in Croatia

D3 state road

Route information
- Length: 218.4 km (135.7 mi)

Major junctions
- From: Goričan border crossing to Hungary
- A4 in Goričan, Breznički Hum, Komin and Popovec interchanges D20 in Čakovec; D209 in Čakovec; D208 in Nedelišće; D2 near Varaždin; D528 near Varaždin; D22 in Novi Marof; D24 in Novi Marof; D29 in Soblinec; A3 in Ivanja Reka and Lučko interchanges A1 in Lučko and Karlovac interchanges D1 in Karlovac; D310 in Jastrebarsko; D228 in Karlovac; D6 in Karlovac; D36 in Karlovac; D23 in Duga Resa; D204 in Bosanci; D42 near Vrbovsko; D32 in Delnice; D203 in Delnice; A6 in Delnice interchange D501 in Gornje Jelenje
- To: D8 in Rijeka

Location
- Country: Croatia
- Counties: Međimurje, Varaždin, Zagreb County, City of Zagreb, Karlovac, Primorje-Gorski Kotar
- Major cities: Čakovec, Varaždin, Zagreb, Karlovac, Duga Resa, Delnice, Rijeka

Highway system
- Highways in Croatia

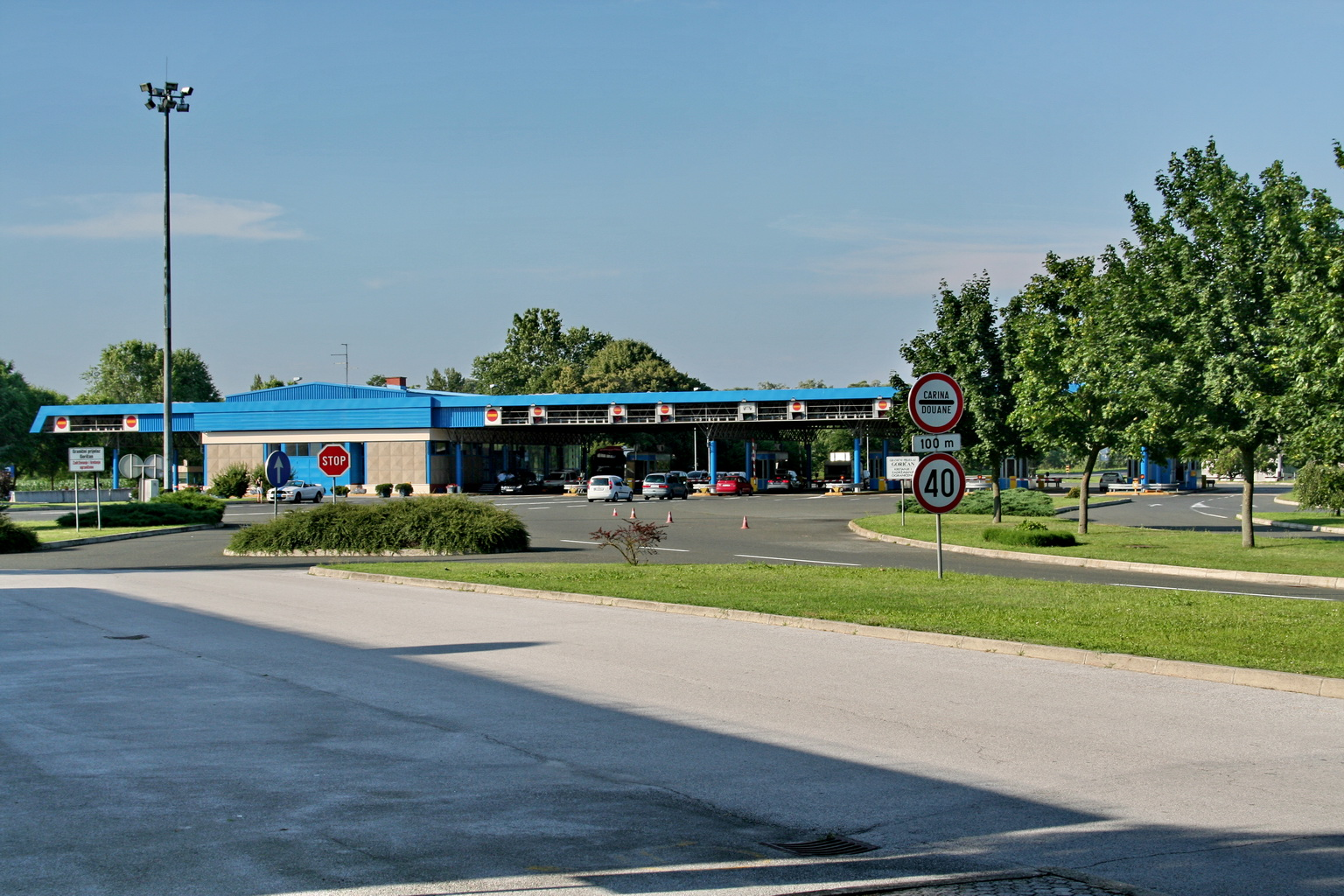
Goričan border crossing, at the northern terminus of the D3 road

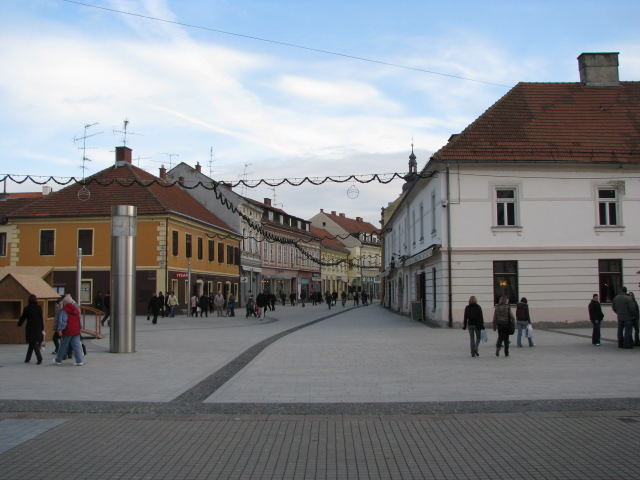
Čakovec, on the D3 route

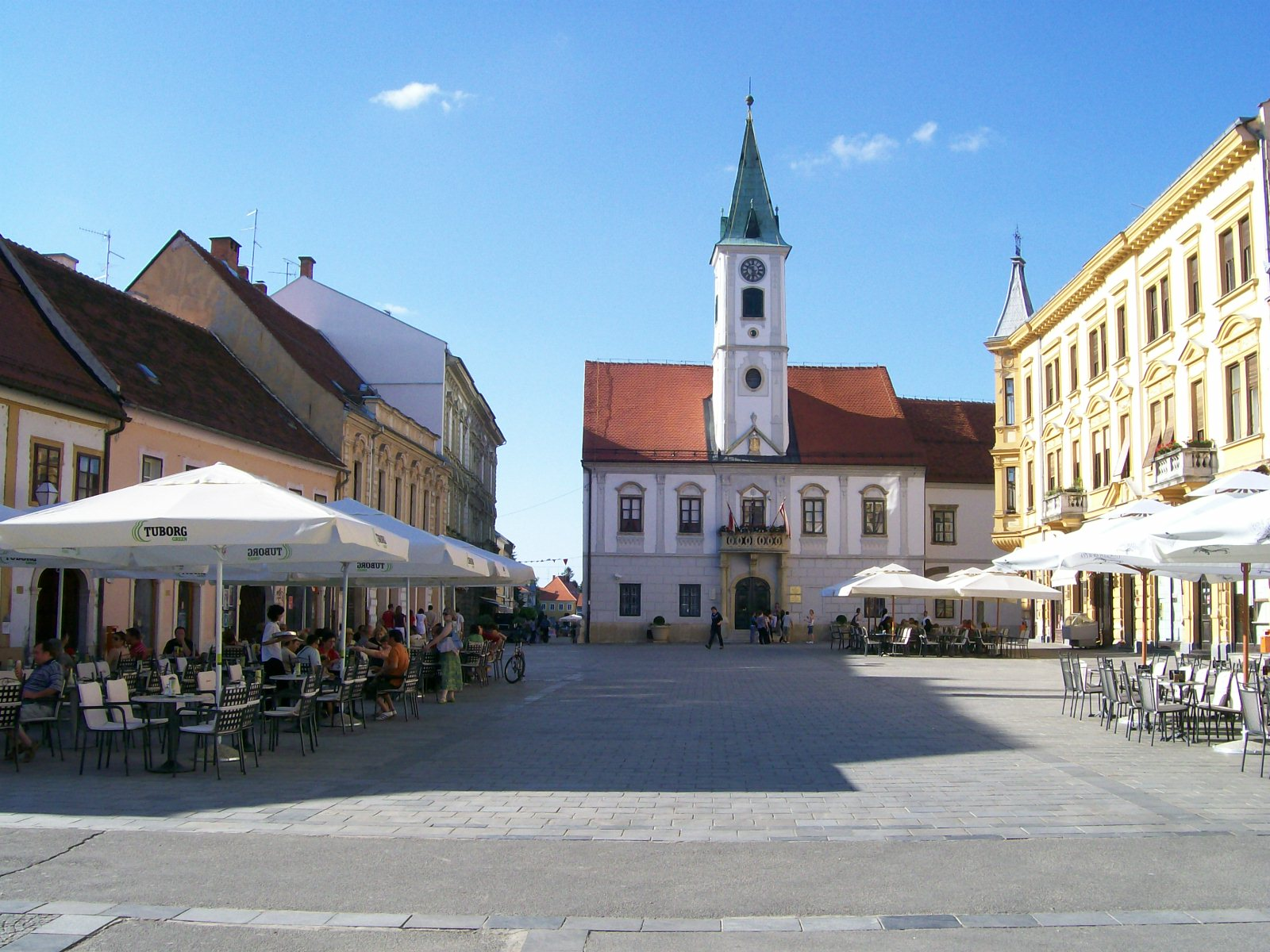
Varaždin, on the D3 route

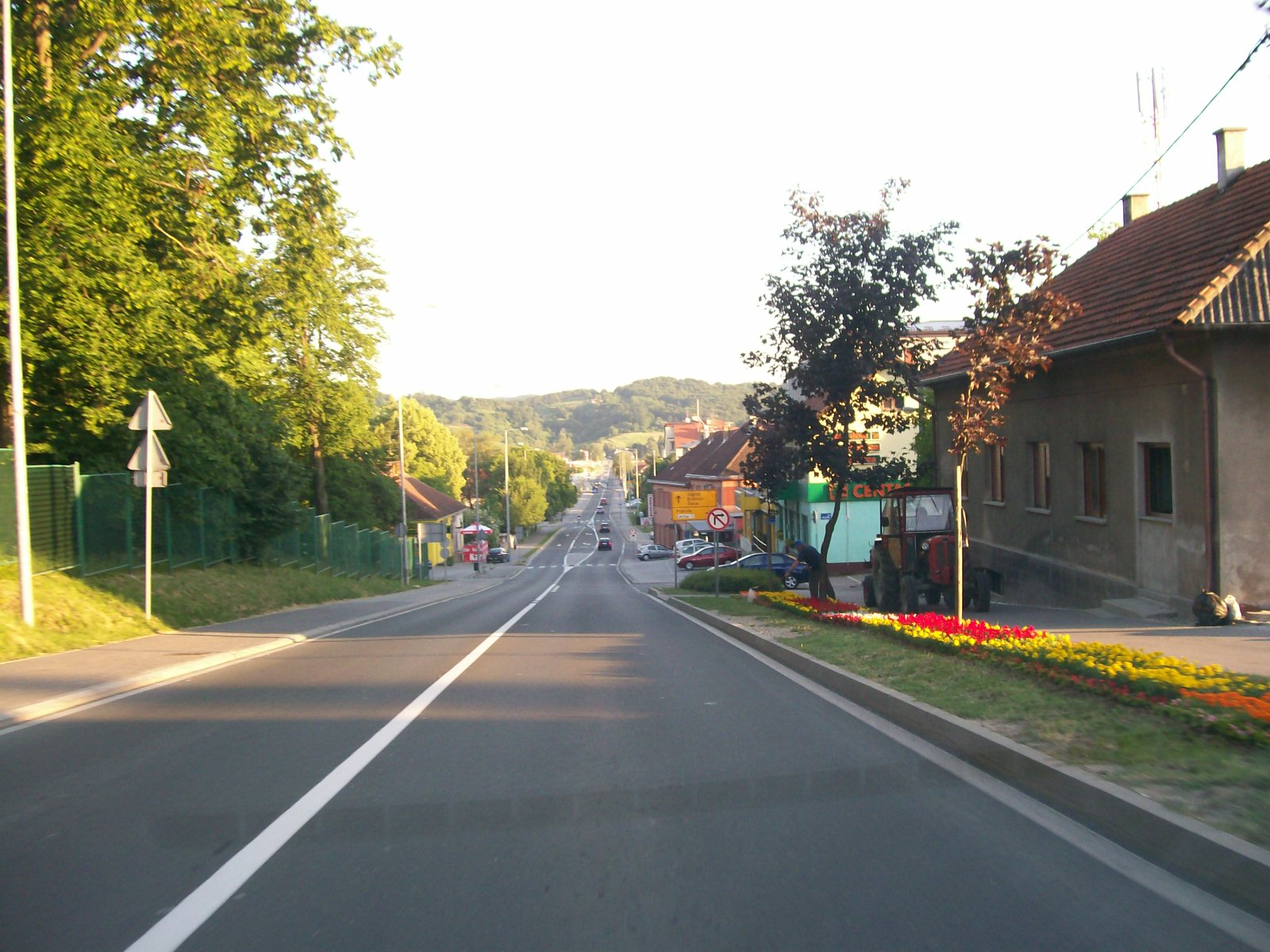
Novi Marof, on the D3 route

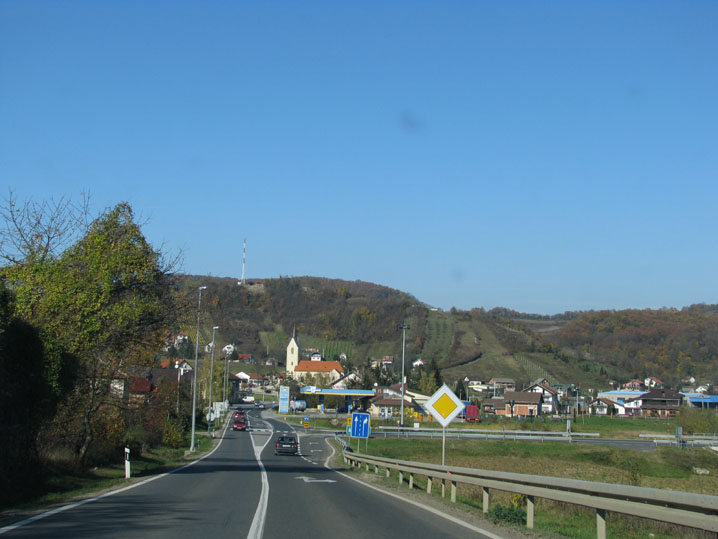
Breznički Hum, on the D3 route

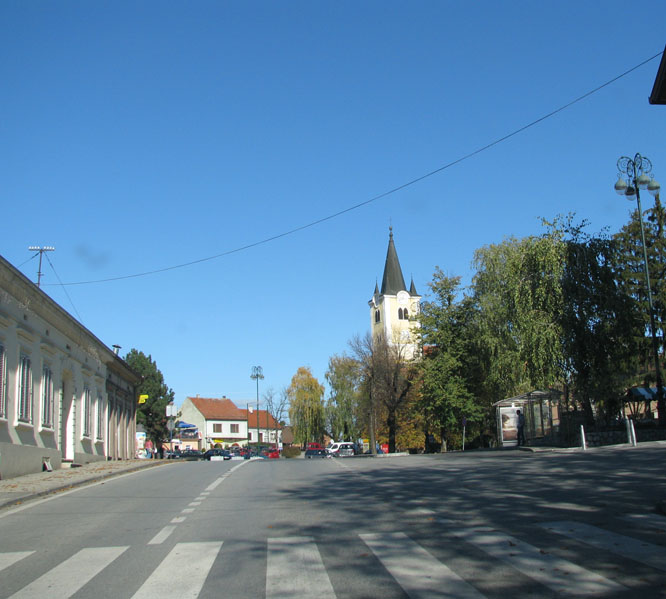
Sveti Ivan Zelina, on the D3 route

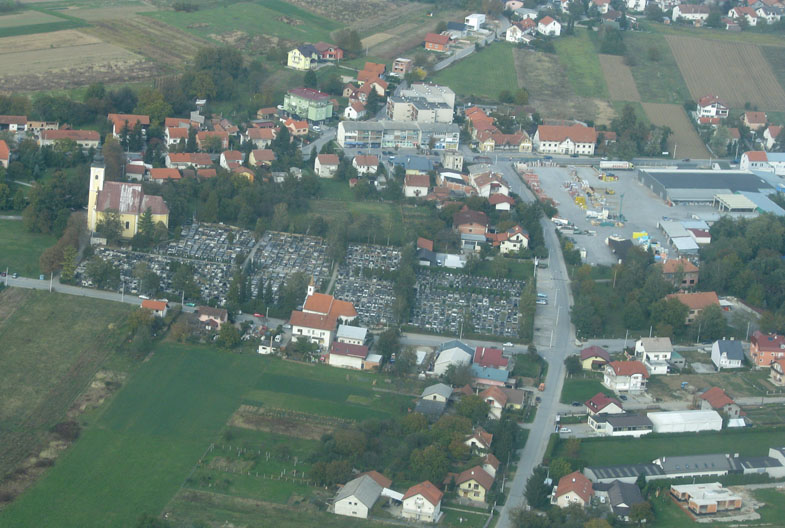
Lučko, on the D3 route

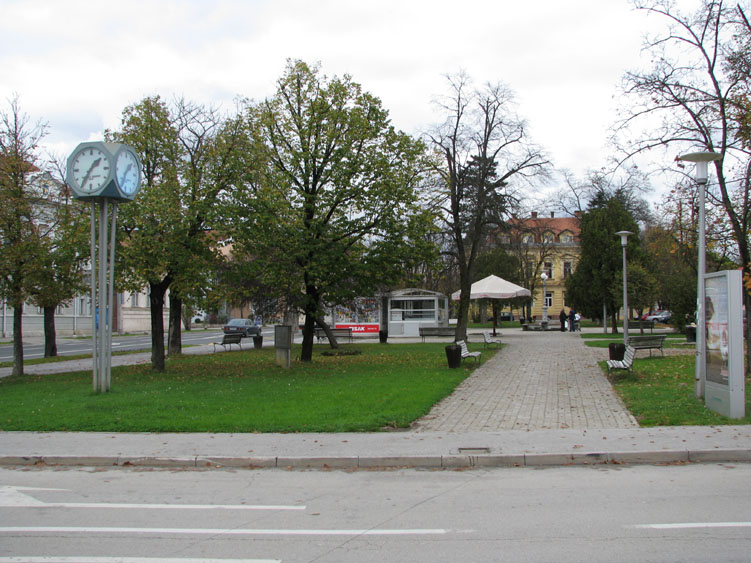
Jastrebarsko, on the D3 route

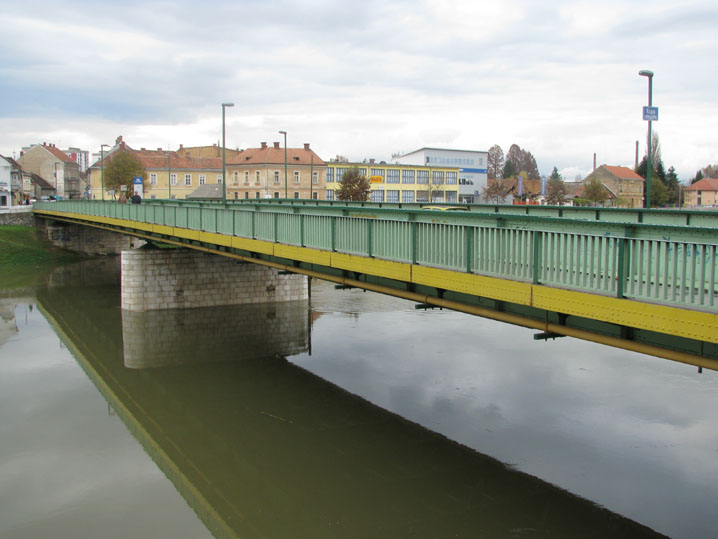
Karlovac, on the D3 route

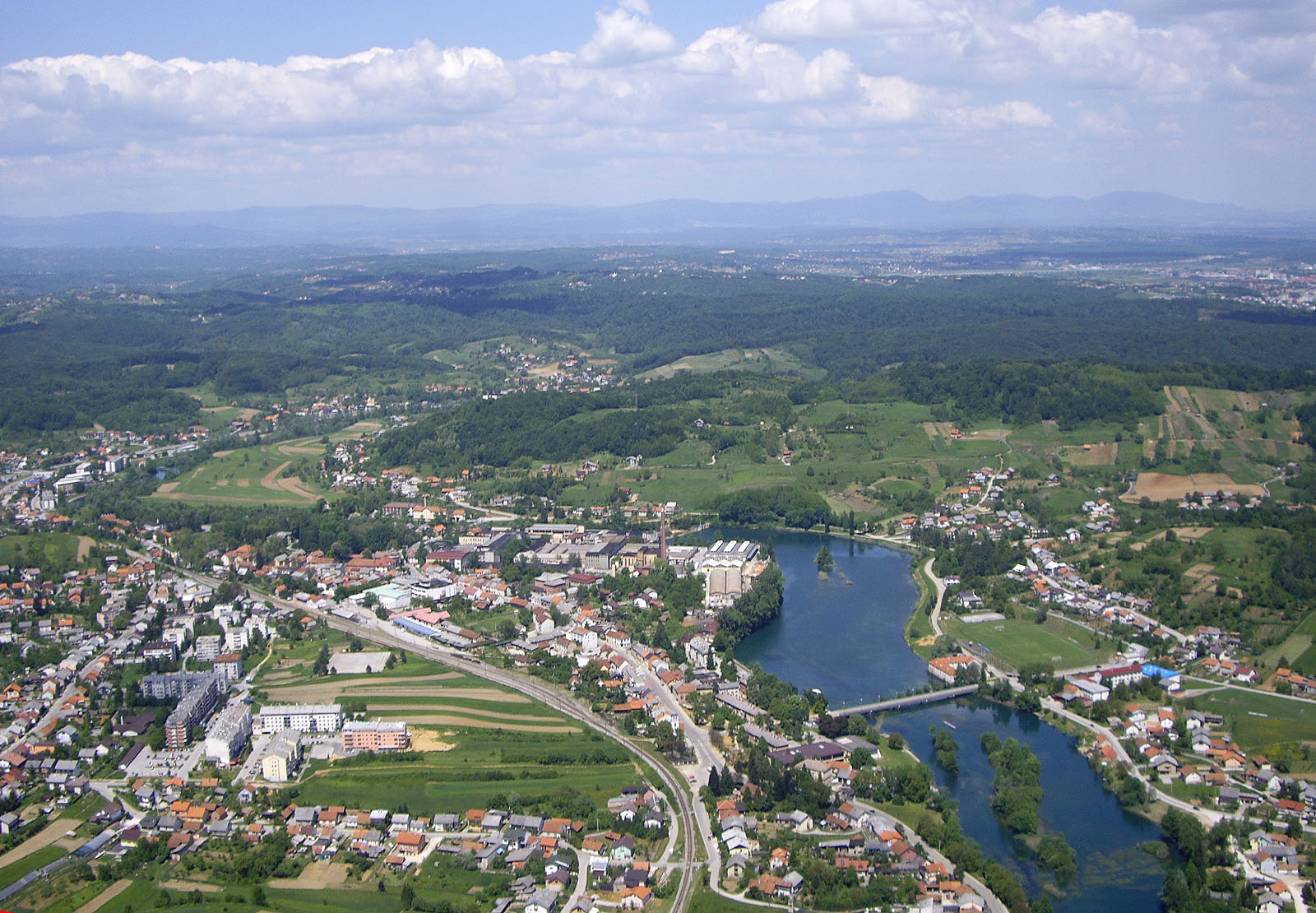
Duga Resa, on the D3 route

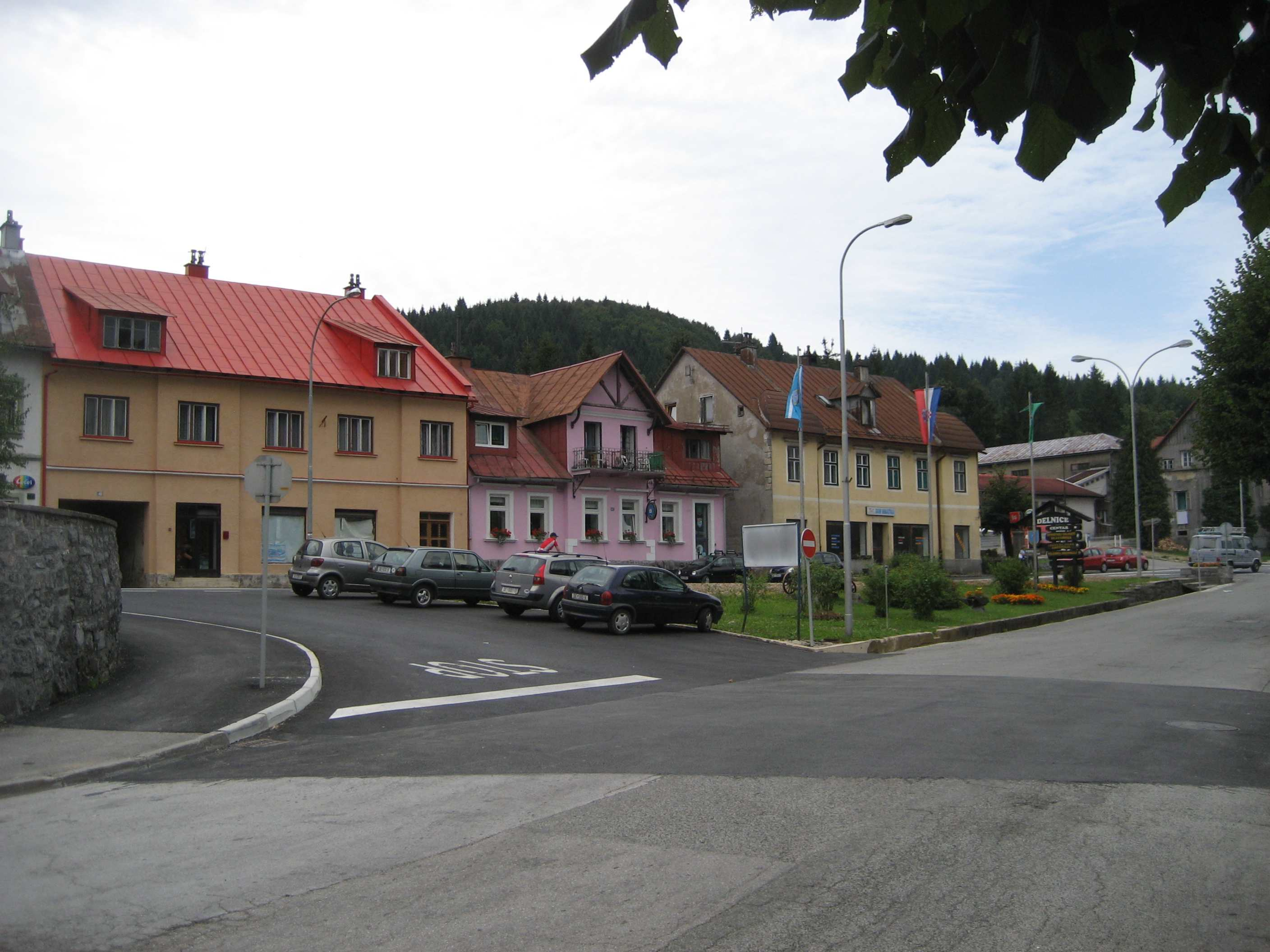
Delnice, on the D3 route

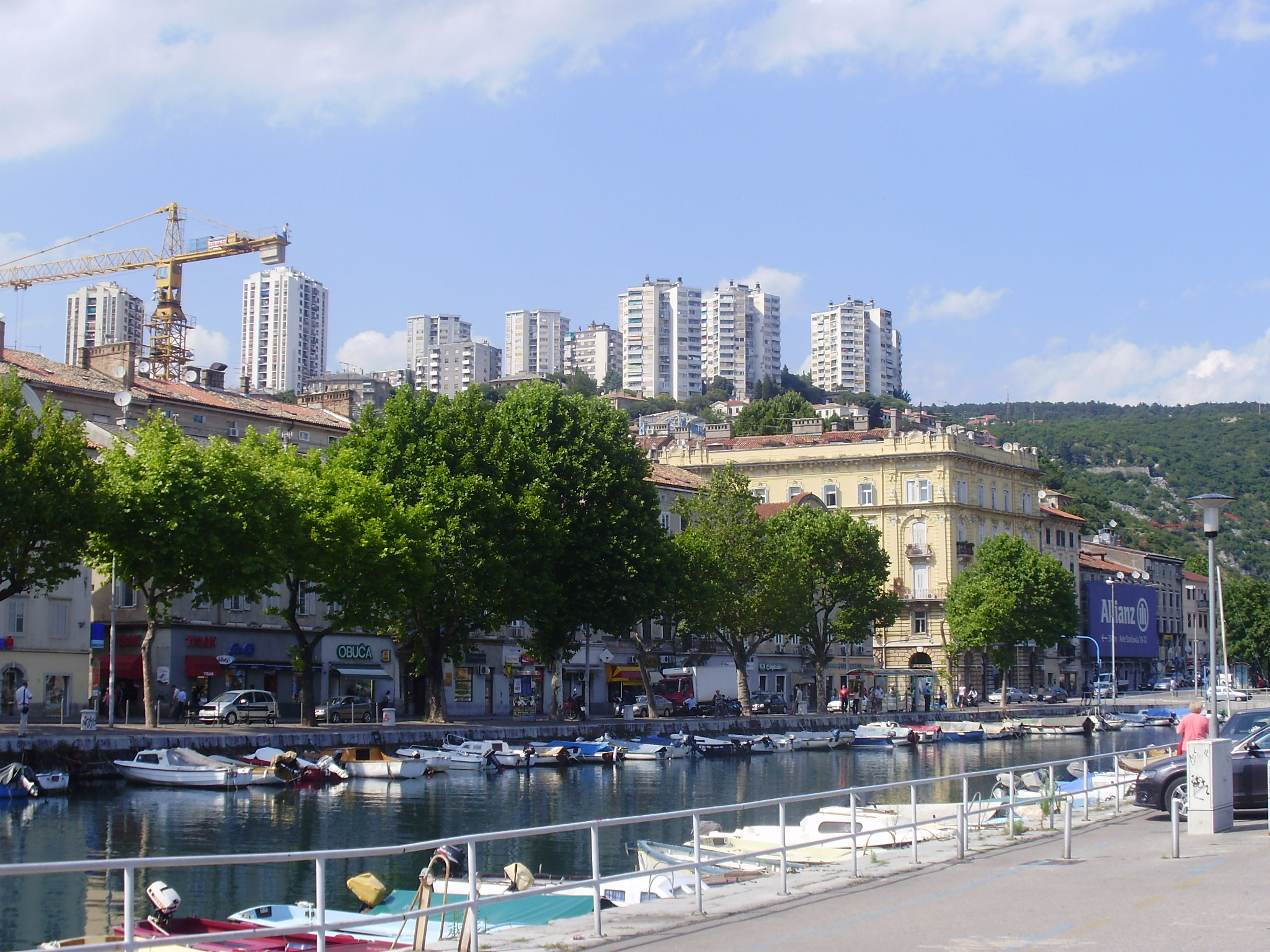
Rijeka, at the southern terminus of the D3 road

D3 is a state road in western parts of Croatia connecting Rijeka on the Adriatic coast to Zagreb, Karlovac and Varaždin, as well as to the Goričan border crossing to Hungary. Furthermore, the D3 is used as a parallel road to a number of motorways in Croatia – namely the A4 motorway north of Zagreb, the A1 motorway between Zagreb and Bosiljevo 2 interchange south of Karlovac and finally the A6 motorway between Bosiljevo 2 interchange and Rijeka – and it connects to nearly all motorway interchanges on that route either directly or via connecting roads. The road is 218.4 km (135.7 mi) long.

The D3 state road is concurrent along parts of its route with other state roads, most notably the D1 between Zagreb and Karlovac, as well as some sections of the A4 (south of Popovec interchange) and the A3 (between Ivanja Reka and Lučko interchanges) motorways. The A3 and A4 motorway sections that are concurrent with the D3 state road are also a part of Zagreb bypass and are not tolled.

The road, as well as all other state roads in Croatia, is managed and maintained by Hrvatske ceste, a state-owned company.

== Traffic volume ==
Traffic is regularly counted and reported by Hrvatske ceste, operator of the road.

D3 traffic volume
Road	Counting site	AADT	ASDT	Notes
D3	1302 Goričan	1,012	1,694	Between the border crossing and Ž2032 junction.
D3	1315 Štefanec	3,681	3,928	Adjacent to the Ž2022 and junction.
D3	1234 Čakovec	7,931	8,176	Between the D20 and Ž2031 junctions.
D3	1205 Pušćine	10,783	11,130	Adjacent to the D208 junction.
D3	1221 Novi Marof	6,821	7,107	Adjacent to the Ž2136 junction.
D3	2003 Blažev Dol	7,354	7,215	Adjacent to the Ž3016 junction.
D3	2032 Belovar	11,169	10,576	Adjacent the Ž1006 junction.
D3	3003 Duga Resa	9,949	11,039	Between the Ž3181 and D23 junctions.
D3	3005 Vrbovsko	1,168	1,845	Adjacent to the L58032 junction.
D3	2937 Skrad	1,229	1,788	Adjacent to the L58032 junction.
D3	2905 Delnice	5695	7560	Between the D203 and D32 junctions. The AADT figure estimated by Hrvatske ceste.
D3	2935 Gornje Jelenje	2,662	3,903	Between the Ž5032 and D501 junctions.

== Road junctions and populated areas ==
D3 junctions/populated areas
Type	Slip roads/Notes
	Goričan border crossing to Hungary. Route 7 to Letenye, Hungary. The northern terminus of the road.
	A4 in Goričan interchange to motorway border crossing to Nagykanizsa, Hungary via the Hungarian M7 motorway (to the north) and to Čakovec, Varaždin and Zagreb (to the south). Ž2026 to Goričan, Donji Kraljevec and Prelog (D20).
	Hodošan; Ž2003 to Turčišće, Miklavec, Mursko Središće (D209) and Sveti Martin na Muri.
	Ž2034 to Donji Kraljevec and Draškovec (D20).
	Sveti Juraj u Trnju; Ž2033 to Prelog and Otok.
	Donji Pustakovec
	Ž2024 to Palinovec.
	Palovec; Ž2023 to Turčišće.
	Mala Subotica; Ž2022 to Belica, Orehovica and D2 state road.
	Štefanec
	D20 to the A4 motorway Čakovec interchange, Prelog, Đelekovec and Koprivnica (D2).
	Čakovec; D209 to Šenkovec and Mursko Središće border crossing to Lendava, Slovenia. Ž2020 to Totovec and Kuršanec.
	Nedelišće; D208 to Trnovec border crossing to Ormož, Slovenia. Ž2015 to Slakovec and Brezje (D227).
	Pušćine
	Gornji Kuršanec; Ž2020 to Kuršanec, Totovec and Čakovec.
	Varaždin; D2 to Ludbreg (to the east). The D2 and D3 roads are concurrent to the south of the junction.
	D2 to Hrašćica and Dubrava Križovljanska border crossing to Ptuj, Slovenia (to the west). The D2 and D3 roads are concurrent to the north of the junction. D528 to the A4 motorway Varaždin interchange.
	Turčin; Ž2048 to Varaždin. Ž2250 to Varaždinske Toplice (D24). Ž2086 to Tomaševec Biškupečki.
	Križanec
	Lužan Biškupečki
	Presečno; Ž2109 to Oštrice and Petkovec Toplički (D24).
	Novi Marof; D22 to Križevci (D41) and Sveti Ivan Žabno (D28). D24 to Zabok (D1) and Ludbreg (D2). Ž2050 to Remetinec, Beletinec, Sveti Ilija and Beretinec. Ž2136 to Ključ.
	Ž2135 to Grana (D24) and Možđenec (D22) .
	Ž2134 to Donje Makojišće and the D24 state road.
	Breznički Hum; Ž2171 to Hrašćina and the D24 state road.
	A4 in Breznički Hum interchange to Varaždin (to the north) and to Zagreb (to the south). There is a short connector road serving this interchange.
	Ž2174 to Breznica (the road loops to Breznica and back to the D3 forming two junctions with the latter).
	Ž2175 to Visoko and Sudovec (D22).
	Jarek Bisaški
	Podvorec
	Mirkovec Breznički; Ž2207 to Bisag and Drašković.
	Dubovec Bisaški
	Komin; Ž3002 to Zaistovec, Gregurovec and Križevci (D41). Ž3001 to Bedenica.
	A4 in Komin interchange to Varaždin (to the north) and to Zagreb (to the south). There is a short connector road serving this interchange.
	Filipovići
	Hrastje; Ž2221 to Donje Orešje and Marija Bistrica (D29). Ž3015 to Polonje.
	Pretoki
	Sveti Ivan Zelina; Ž3288 to Vrbovec and Dubrava interchange (D10). Ž3014 to Biškupec Zelinski.
	Ž3013 to Donje Psarjevo and Nespeš.
	Blaževdol
	Ž3016 to Sveta Helena and Rakovec.
	Donja Zelina
	Ž3038 to Bukovec Zelinski.
	Goričica; Ž3039 to Paukovec.
	Blaškovec; Ž3010 to Gornja Drenova.
	Belovar; Ž1006 to Adamovac, Moravče and the D29 state road.
	Žerjavinec
	Soblinec; D29 to Marija Bistrica, Zlatar Bistrica and Novi Golubovec (D35). Ž1014 to Šašinovec.
	Popovec.
	A4 in Popovec interchange to Varaždin (to the north) and to Zagreb (to the south). The D3 state road and the A4 motorway are concurrent to the south of the interchange.
	Kraljevečki Novaki interchange Ž3034 to Dugo Selo and Vrbovec 1 interchange (D10). To Zagreb via Sesvete. The D3 and the A4 are concurrent at this interchange.
	Ivanja Reka interchange A3 to Slavonski Brod (to the east). To Zagreb via Slavonska Avenue. The D3 and the A3 are concurrent between at this interchange and Lučko interchange (to the west).
	Kosnica interchange D31 to Velika Gorica and Gornji Viduševac (D6). To Zagreb via Radnička Road. The D3 and the A3 are concurrent at this interchange.
	Buzin interchange D30 to Zagreb and Velika Gorica. The D3 and the A3 are concurrent at this interchange.
	Lučko interchange A3 to Jankomir interchange and Samobor (to the west). A1 to Karlovac and Split. D1 to Karlovac - The D1 and the D3 are concurrent south of this junction. To Zagreb via Jadranska Avenue. The D3 and the A3 are concurrent between at this interchange and Ivanja Reka interchange (to the east).
	Lučko; Ž3064 to Rakitje.
	Gornji Stupnik; Ž3067 to Donji Stupnik.
	Ž3061 to Kalinovica, Brezje Samoborsko and Sveta Nedjelja.
	Rakov Potok
	Klinča Sela; Ž3106 to Kupinec and Pisarovina (D36).
	Ž3105 to Stankovo.
	Jastrebarsko; D310 to A1 motorway Jastrebarsko interchange. Ž3055 to Donja Reka and Samobor
	Novaki Petrovinski; Ž3102 to Draga Svetojanska and Hrastje Plešivičko. Ž3103 to Domagović.
	Čeglje
	Ž3101 to Guci Draganički and Brezarić.
	Draganić; Ž3150 to Lazina.
	Lug; Ž3146 to Tuškani and Mahično.
	A1 Karlovac interchange to Zagreb (to the north) and to Rijeka, Zadar and Split (to the south). The interchange is accessed via a short connector.
	The northern terminus of dual carriageway expressway through Karlovac.
	Karlovac; D1 to Plitvice Lakes National Park and Knin (to the south). The D1 and D3 roads are concurrent to the north of Karlovac. D6 to Netretić (to the west) and to Vojnić, Glina and Dvor (to the east). the D3 and D6 roads are concurrent in a short section in Karlovac. D36 to Pokupsko, Sisak and A3 motorway Popovača interchange. D228 to Ozalj and Jurovski Brod (D6).
	The D3 junction with a dual carriageway expressway through Karlovac.
	Mala Švarča; Ž3181 to Donje Mrzlo Polje and Duga Resa.
	Gornje Mrzlo Polje Mrežničko
	Duga Resa; D23 to Josipdol, Žuta Lokva and Senj (D8). Ž3180 to Zagradci.
	Petrakovo Brdo
	Dubravci
	Jarče Polje; Ž3142 to Novigrad and Donje Stative (D6). Ž3174 to Bosiljevo.
	Vukova Gorica; Ž3141 to Netretić (D6). Ž3175 to Resnik Bosiljevski (D204), Orišje and Ogulin (D42).
	Bosanci; D204 to Pribanjci border crossing to Črnomelj, Slovenia (to the north) and A1 motorway Bosiljevo 1 interchange (to the south).
	Zdihovo
	Rim
	Klanac
	Severin na Kupi
	Močile
	Nadvučnik
	Stubica
	D42 to Vrbovsko and Ogulin.
	Hajdine
	Presika
	Vučinići
	Ž5036 to Moravice.
	Dokmanovići
	Nikšići
	Tomići
	Ž5033 to Brod Moravice and Brod na Kupi.
	Donja Dobra
	Gornja Dobra
	Skrad
	Podstena
	Kupjak; Ž5034 to Ravna Gora and Vrbovsko (D42).
	Zalesina
	Dedin
	Delnice; D32 to Prezid border crossing to Slovenia, route 213. D203 to Brod na Kupi border crossing to Slovenia, route 106.
	Ž5184 to Lučice.
	A6 Delnice interchange to Rijeka (to the west) and to Karlovac and Zagreb (to the east). The interchange is accessed via a short connector.
	Lokve; Ž5191 to Mrkopalj and Jezerane (D23).
	Sljeme
	Ž5067 to Homer.
	Ž5062 to Fužine.
	Gornje Jelenje; D501 to A6 motorway Oštrovica interchange, Križišće, Šmrika and D8 state road. Ž5032 to Crni Lug.
	Ž5030 to Platak.
	A6 Kikovica interchange to Rijeka (to the west) and to Karlovac and Zagreb (to the east). The interchange is accessed via a short connector.
	Soboli; Ž5028 to Jezero.
	Čavle; Ž5055 to Dražice, Trnovica, Saršoni and Viškovo. Ž5205 to Škrljevo and Sveti Kuzam interchange (A7 motorway).
	Orehovica; Ž5017 to Saršoni, Škalnica and Rupa (D8).
	Rijeka; D8 to Matulji and Rupa (to the west) and to Bakar and Senj (to the east).The southern terminus of the road.
