= Donje Prilišće =

- Village
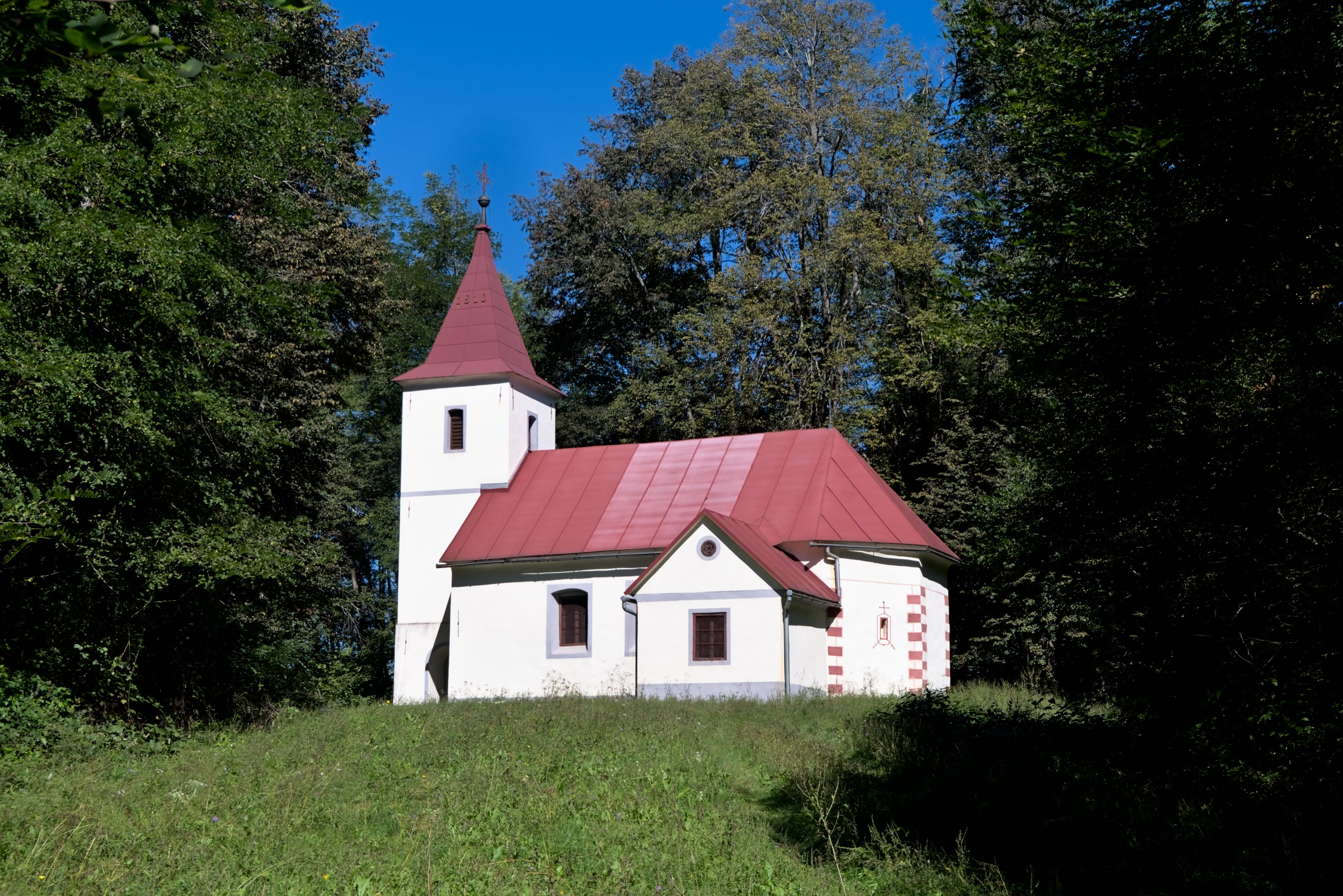
- Church of St. Leonarda near Donje Prilišće
- Interactive map of Donje Prilišće
- Coordinates: 45.476°N 15.373°E
- Country: Croatia
- County: Karlovac County
- Municipality: Netretić

Area
  - Total: 4 km^{2} (1.5 sq mi)

Population (2021)
  - Total: 67
  - Density: 17/km^{2} (43/sq mi)
- Time zone: UTC+1 (CET)
  - Summer (DST): UTC+2 (CEST)

Donje Prilišće is a village in Croatia. It is connected by the D3 highway.

== Name ==
Prilišće was recorded as Priliszie on the 1673 map of Stjepan Glavač.

== History ==
In 1544, Nikola Šubić Zrinski settled Catholics from Rmanj in the nearby Vukova Gorica, Prilišće and Rosopajnik.

== Volunteer Fire Department ==
The volunteer fire department DVD Prilišće is the oldest such department on the territory of the former Duga Resa municipality, and was founded by villagers from Prilišće, Ladešić Draga, Glavica, and Račak on 5 May 1929. As its founding members could only contribute 150 Yugoslav dinars each, it relied on financial assistance from Josip Volović and the emigrant club in Pittsburgh, along with a number of eminent local businessmen. Its founding members numbered 59, including:

- Miho Šimunović (president)
- Aleksandar Salinger, teacher (secretary)
- Janko Cunić (commander)
- Ivan Skube (deputy commander)
- Leonard Žunić (treasurer)
- Ivan "Ivaš" Bestić II (equipment keeper)
- Jakšić Nikola (section leader)
- Gojtan Franko (section leader)
- Mijo Šimunović (equipment keeper)
- Josip Puškarić (military delegate)
- Ivan Lorković (municipal delegate)
- Antun Skube (trumpeter)
- Nikola Bestić
- Juraj Bendeković
- Josip Bahorić
- Ivan "Rošo" Bestić
- Stjepan Bratanić, parish administrator
- Nikola Čoholić
- Franjo Erdeljac
- Nikola Erdeljac
- Matija Jakšić
- Josip Haramić
- Franjo Škrtić
- Martin Tahija

Honorary membership was later conferred on a number of DVD members for longstanding contributions: Salinger, Bestić (who later served as its first post-war president), Ivan Komanac (first post-war commander), Josip Boljkovac (longstanding secretary), Josip Sladić (various roles up to president), Franjo Boljkovac (ajutant, secretary, commander), Franjo Žunić (secretary), Janko Erdeljac (longstanding president), and Mirko Cunić, who was president for 17 years and built the fire station.

Their first firehose was purchased in April 1931, and their lookout tower was built in 1932. In 1933, Ivan Skube and Josip Bahorić built a vehicle on which the firehose was mounted. The fire station was built in 1935–1937, though they could not secure financial assistance from the government, landing them in debt. Thanks to a lack of uniforms, the DVD Prilišće could not participate in any of the more important regional firefighting efforts until they were purchased in March 1939. The first fire outside Prilišće they helped put out was in Preloka, for which they had to push the hose across the Kupa. When WWII began, most of its members joined the army, so that it effectively ceased operations until the end of the war.

The first post-war meeting of the DVD Prilišće came on 10 February 1946. Ivan Bestić was elected its president, Ivan Komanac its commander, teacher Marko Baličević its secretary, and Ivica Bendeković its treasurer. Much of the equipment had been looted by Partisans, so the task of purchasing replacements was given priority. Over the course of a decade, with the help of teacher Vilko Bezjak, the DVD Prilišće branched out, forming an Arts and Culture Section and a Sports Section, from which its own football club arose. Finally, in 1959, they obtained their first fire engine.

On 15 December 1963, Mirko Cunić was elected president, Josip Boljkovac secretary, Ivan Mušić commander, and Josip Sladić treasurer. In April 1967, they initiated the adaptation and expansion of the fire station and tower. These renovations lasted until 1972. A lack of available concrete mixers meant all the work was done by hand. In 1973, they purchased a modern fire hose, and in 1976, they purchased a new fire engine. In the 1970s, the DVD Prilišće reached its equipment peak, with a total valuation of 150,000 DEM. A Female Firefighting Section was founded on 23 September 1977 with 13 members.

Aside from firefighting and the aforementioned sections, the DVD Prilišće was also activated for the construction of the local water pipeline, telephone lines, the bridge over the Kupa, the heritage house (Serbo-Croatian: Zavičajni dom), the morgue, and so on.

Today it is part of the overarching VZ općine Netretić.

== Bibliography ==
- Melem Hajdarović, Mihela (2023-06-14). "Glavačeva karta Hrvatske iz 1673. – njezini toponimi, geografski sadržaj i historijskogeografski kontekst" [Glavač’s map of Croatia from 1673: Its toponyms, geographical content, and historical-geographical context]. Studia lexicographica. 17 (32): 47–78. doi:10.33604/sl.17.32.2. eISSN 2459-5578.
- Jagodin, Nikola; Runjić, Vedran (2022). "Popis vatrogasnih organizacija s datumima osnivanja" [List of Firefighting Organisations with Date of Founding]. Muzej hrvatskog vatrogastva (in Croatian). Archived from the original on 2023-01-30.
- Cunić, Vesna (1994). "Dobrovoljno vatrogasno društvo Prilišće". Prilišće - Kupa, ljudi i tri sela [Volunteer Fire Department Prilišće] (in Serbo-Croatian).
- Volović, N. (2009). "Dobrovoljno vatrogasno društvo Prilišće" [Volunteer Fire Department Prilišće]. Prilišće: Kupa, ljudi i tri sela na Lujzijani (in Serbo-Croatian).
- Strohal, Rudolf (1932). Grad i selo Severin u Gorskom Kotaru na Kupi [The Town and Village of Severin in Gorski Kotar on the Kupa] (in Croatian). Zagreb: Jugoslovenska štampa.
