= Sveti Ilija, Varaždin County =

Municipality in Varaždin County, Croatia

Sveti Ilija
- Interactive map of Sveti Ilija
- Location of Sveti Ilija in Croatia
- Coordinates: 46.250°N 16.317°E
- Country: Croatia
- County: Varaždin County

Area
  - City: 17.2 km^{2} (6.6 sq mi)
  - Urban: 2.9 km^{2} (1.1 sq mi)

Population (2021)
  - City: 3,242
  - Density: 188/km^{2} (488/sq mi)
  - Urban: 572
  - Urban density: 200/km^{2} (510/sq mi)
- Website: opcina-sveti-ilija.hr

Sveti Ilija is a village and municipality in Croatia in Varaždin County.

According to the 2011 census, there are 3,532 inhabitants, in the following settlements:

- Beletinec, population 956
- Doljan, population 409
- Križanec, population 324
- Krušljevec, population 230
- Seketin, population 387
- Sveti Ilija, population 615
- Tomaševec Biškupečki, population 379
- Žigrovec, population 211

The absolute majority of population are Croats. The municipality was founded in 1992.

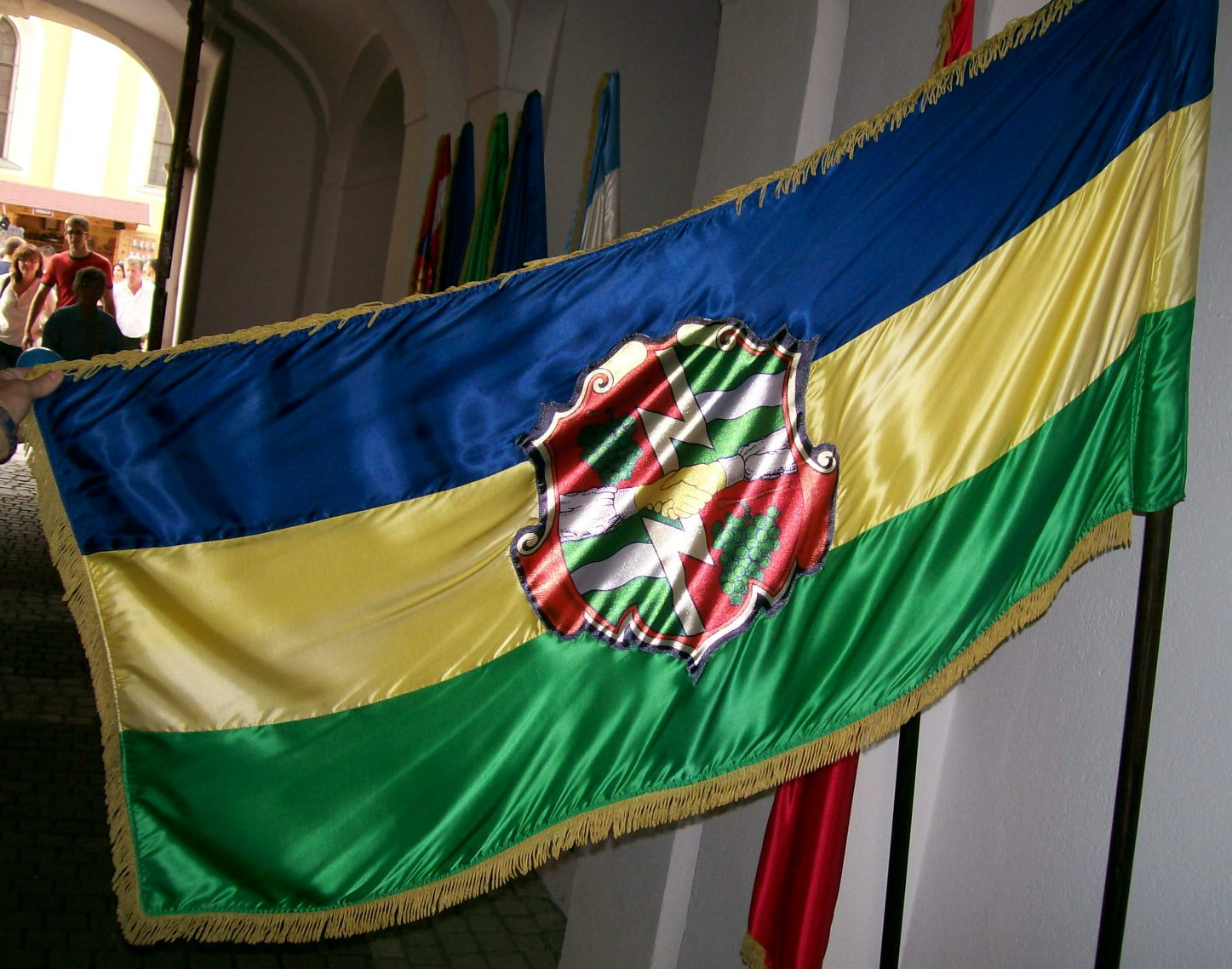
Flag of Municipality of Sveti Ilija
