= Mrzlo Polje =

Mrzlo Polje may refer to:

- Mrzlo Polje, Laško, a village in Slovenia
- Mrzlo Polje, Ivančna Gorica, a village in Slovenia
- Mrzlo Polje, Krapina-Zagorje County, a village near Veliko Trgovišće, Croatia
- Mrzlo Polje Žumberačko, a village in Žumberak, Zagreb County, Croatia
- Gornje Mrzlo Polje Mrežničko, a village near Duga Resa, Croatia
- Donje Mrzlo Polje Mrežničko, a village near Duga Resa, Croatia
- Mrzlo Polje railway station, located south of Švarča, Karlovac, and east of Gornje Mrzlo Polje Mrežničko, Croatia
