= Mrzlo Polje Mrežničko =

Mrzlo Polje Mrežničko may refer to:

- Donje Mrzlo Polje Mrežničko, a village in Croatia
- Gornje Mrzlo Polje Mrežničko, a village in Croatia
