= Blaž Lorković =

Croatian political economist

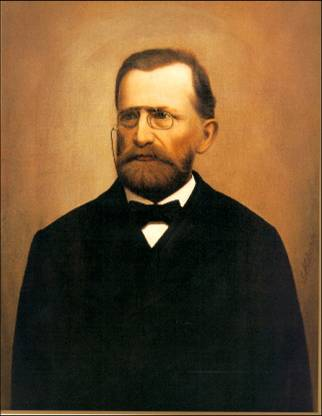
- Lorković, painted by S. Milanese
- Born: 29 January 1839; Jarče Polje, Kingdom of Croatia, Austrian Empire (now Jarče Polje, Croatia)
- Died: 17 February 1892 (aged 53); Zagreb, Croatia-Slavonia, Austria-Hungary (now Zagreb, Croatia)
- Occupations: economist, lawyer

Blaž Lorković (pronounced [blâːʒ lǒːrkoʋit͡ɕ]; 29 January 1839 – 17 February 1892) was a Croatian economist and lawyer, considered to be the founder of Croatian political economy. Due to his contributions, Croatia named its Order of Danica Hrvatska for business and economics after him.

== Biography ==
Lorković was born in Jarče Polje near Karlovac to a rural family, the only child of Pavao and Julka Lorković. In 1851, he attended high school in Varaždin, where he was noticed and in 1854, with the help and persuasion of his uncle, the parish priest in the village Rasinja near Koprivnica, he moved to Zagreb. He was located at the Episcopal orphanage. After completing high school education in October 1857, Lorković turned to the clergy and entered the archdiocesan seminary, deciding to answer the vocational call to the priesthood to satisfy his parents and uncle. During his time in seminary, he edited literary magazines and fought against Germanization. He left the seminary on 17 February 1862. In October 1863, he entered as a regular student into the University of Zagreb's Faculty of Law. He passed all the exams in regular period with highest grades. In July 1867, Lorković successfully finished his four-year law degree.

On 16 December 1871, Lorković became a teacher at the Royal Juridical Academy. He replaced his belletristic work with scientific and educational at the Juridical Academy and similar associations.

The most important of Lorković's scientific work is Počela političke ekonomije ili nauke obćega gospodarstva, which was published by Matica hrvatska in 1889 in the context of a series of publications for Croatian dealers.

He served as a rector of the University of Zagreb in the academic year 1883/1884.

He died in Zagreb in 1892. He is buried at Mirogoj Cemetery.

His son Ivan Lorković and grandson Mladen Lorković became influential politicians in their own right.

== Work ==
Scientific works:

- Foundations of Political Economy or the Science of General Economics (Croatian: Počela političke ekonomije ili nauke obćega gospodarstva)
- Discourses on the National Economy (Croatian: Razgovori o narodnom gospodarstvu)
- What the Economic Condition of Croatia in the 18th Century Was, Which of These Ideas of National Economy Prevailed, and Who the Defenders of Those Ideas Were (Croatian: Kakvo bijaše gospodarsko stanje Hrvatske u 18. stoljeću, kakove su narodno-gospodarske ideje tada vladale i kakvi bijahu zastupnici tih ideja, report)
- The Current Condition of Economic Science (Croatian: Sadanje stanje gospodarske nauke, report)
- Women in the Home and in Society (Croatian: Žena u kući i u družtvu)

He published his literary works in popular magazines Vienac and Naše gore list:

- Love and Faith (Croatian: Ljubav i vjernost, short story)
- Several Secret Little Papers (Croatian: Nekoliko tajnih listića, short story)
- The Blind Man (Croatian: Sliepac, novella)
- Infidelity (Croatian: Nevjera, short story)
- Traveling Occasions and Mishaps (Croatian: Putne sgode i nesgode, itinerary)
- The Dance Croatian: Ples, novella)
- Under the Pear Tree (Croatian: Pod kruškom, novella)
- Exceptions (Croatian: Iznimke, short story)
- The Mediator (Croatian: Posrednik, short story)
- Easter Eggs (Croatian: Pisanice, short story)
- Too Late (Croatian: Prekasno, short story)
- Convicted Vanity (Croatian: Kažnjena taština)
- Field on the Sea (Croatian: Mejdan na moru, novella)
- Confession (Croatian: Izpoviest, novel)
- Father and Daughter (Croatian: Otac i kći, short story)
- Past and Present (Croatian: Prošlost i sadašnjost)
- Croats and Serbs (Croatian: Hrvati i Srbi, article)

== Notes ==
Academic offices
Preceded by Feliks Suk	Rector of the University of Zagreb; 1883 – 1884	Succeeded by Đuro Pilar
