= Vukova Gorica =

- Village
- Location within Croatia
- Coordinates: 45°27′N 15°20′E
- Country: Croatia
- County: Karlovac County
- Municipality: Netretić

Area
  - Total: 2.7 km^{2} (1.0 sq mi)

Population (2021)
  - Total: 52
  - Density: 19/km^{2} (50/sq mi)
- Time zone: UTC+1 (CET)
  - Summer (DST): UTC+2 (CEST)

Vukova Gorica is a village in Croatia. It is connected by the D3 highway.

== Name ==
It was recorded as Vukouagoritza on the 1673 map of Stjepan Glavač.

== History ==
In 1544, Nikola Šubić Zrinski settled Catholics from Rmanj in the nearby Vukova Gorica, Prilišće and Rosopajnik.

After the Lujzijana was built, the Družtvo lujzinske ceste constructed an inn in Vukova Gorica together with a stable and a cistern. In 1874, the society would sell all its assets along the road, including those in Vukova Gorica.

== Politics ==
It is the seat of the Local Committee of Vukova Gorica, encompassing itself and Račak.

== Notable residents ==
- Josip Boljkovac (1920-2014), former Croatian Minister of the Interior
- Ivan Šubašić (1892-1955), Ban of Croatian Banovina and short-time Prime Minister of Yugoslavia

== Bibliography ==
- Melem Hajdarović, Mihela (2023-06-14). "Glavačeva karta Hrvatske iz 1673. – njezini toponimi, geografski sadržaj i historijskogeografski kontekst" [Glavač’s map of Croatia from 1673: Its toponyms, geographical content, and historical-geographical context]. Studia lexicographica. 17 (32): 47–78. doi:10.33604/sl.17.32.2. eISSN 2459-5578.
