= Duga Resa =

- Town
- Grad Duga Resa; Town of Duga Resa
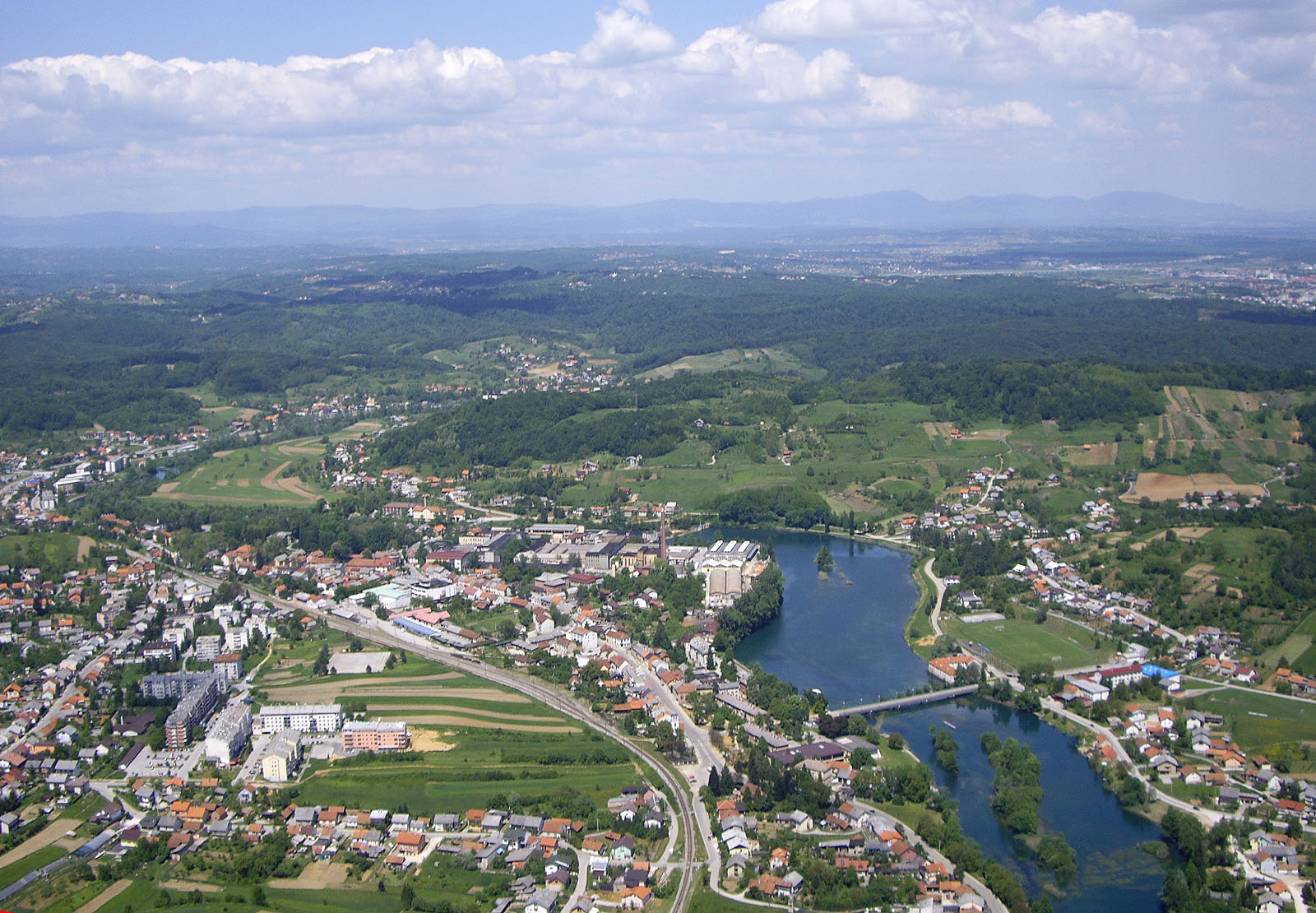
- Panoramic view of the town center on the Mrežnica river.
- Interactive map of Duga Resa
- Location of Duga Resa in Croatia
- Coordinates: 45°26′50″N 15°29′45″E
- Country: Croatia
- Region: Central Croatia
- County: Karlovac County

Government
  - Mayor: Tomislav Boljar (HSS)

Area
  - Town: 60.9 km^{2} (23.5 sq mi)
  - Urban: 3.5 km^{2} (1.4 sq mi)

Population (2021)
  - Town: 10,212
  - Density: 168/km^{2} (434/sq mi)
  - Urban: 5,380
  - Urban density: 1,500/km^{2} (4,000/sq mi)
- Time zone: UTC+1 (Central European Time)
- Website: dugaresa.hr

Duga Resa is a town in Karlovac County, Croatia. It is located about 65 km southwest of Zagreb and 100 km east of Rijeka.

== Name ==
The earliest reference to Duga Resa is from the year 1380. There are several theories on how the then-village acquired its name: one is that "resa" is a reference to the town people's folk costumes; another is that it is named from a native plant that grows in the area, both on the land and in the water.

== History ==
The first known electric generator in Croatia was introduced in Duga Resa in 1880 to power the textile industry in the town.

== Population ==
The village soon grew into a town during the industrialization of the area in the late 19th and early 20th century. In the 2001 census, there were 12,114 inhabitants in the municipality, 96% of which were Croats.

In 2021, the total population is 10,212, in the following settlements:

- Belajska Vinica, population 163 ▼
- Belavići, population 274 ▼
- Bošt, population 47 ▼
- Cerovački Galovići, population 59 ▼
- Donje Mrzlo Polje Mrežničko, population 507 ▼
- Donji Zvečaj, population 180 ▲
- Duga Resa, population 5380 ▼
- Dvorjanci, population 102 ▼
- Galović Selo, population 65 ▼
- Gorica, population 61 ▼
- Gornje Mrzlo Polje Mrežničko, population 544 ▼
- Grganjica, population 16 ▼
- Gršćaki, population 63 ▼
- Kozalj Vrh, population 83 ▼
- Lišnica, population 177 ▼
- Mihalić Selo, population 68 ▼
- Mrežničke Poljice, population 110 ▼
- Mrežnički Brig, population 288 ▲
- Mrežnički Novaki, population 168 ▼
- Mrežnički Varoš, population 901 ▼
- Mrežničko Dvorište, population 48 ▼
- Novo Brdo Mrežničko, population 97 ▼
- Pećurkovo Brdo, population 107 ▲
- Petrakovo Brdo, population 108 ▼
- Sveti Petar Mrežnički, population 132 ▼
- Šeketino Brdo, population 158 ▼
- Venac Mrežnički, population 131
- Zvečaj, population 175 ▼
Town of Duga Resa: Population trends 1857–2021
v

population	3258	3608	3349	4193	4733	5665	5448	7230	8828	9429	10330	11709	13102	14088	12114	11180	10212
	1857	1869	1880	1890	1900	1910	1921	1931	1948	1953	1961	1971	1981	1991	2001	2011	2021

Sources: Croatian Bureau of Statistics publications

== Local interests ==
Popular activities include fishing, rafting, hunting, boating, swimming, volleyball, soccer, and biking. The local churches St. Antun in Duga Resa and St. Peters (Sveti Petar) dates back to the 14th century.

Its geographic location gives the town very hot summers and very cold winters.

== Sports ==
The local chapter of the HPS is HPD "Vinica", which had 70 members in 1936 under the Gabor Mainc presidency, meeting every Thursday. At the time, it had a ski section. Membership fell to 51 in 1937. Under the Ivo Pokolić presidency in 1939 it was dormant, with only 11 members. In August 1941, the Minister of Sport and Mountaineering of the NDH, Miško Zebić, named Ivan Pokolić as the state povjerenik of the chapter, and designated as the chapter's advisory board: Barka Tomac, Greta Kovač, Margita Belić, Mirko Bosiljevac, Filip Mlinarević and Valjo Dragutin.

== Notable people ==
- Antun Stipančić - table tennis player
- Miroslav Šutej - visual artist and designer of Croatian coat of arms
