= Marinići =

Marinici may refer to the following places:

- Marinici, Nisporeni, Moldova
- Marinići, Bosnia and Herzegovina
- Marinići, Croatia
