= Biškupec =

Biškupec may refer to:

- Biškupec, Varaždin, a former village now a neighborhood of Varaždin, Croatia
- Biškupec Zelinski, a village near Sveti Ivan Zelina, Croatia
