= Antun Bauer (bishop) =

Croatian Catholic archbishop and philosopher (1856–1937)

The Most Reverend Antun Bauer
- Archbishop of Zagreb
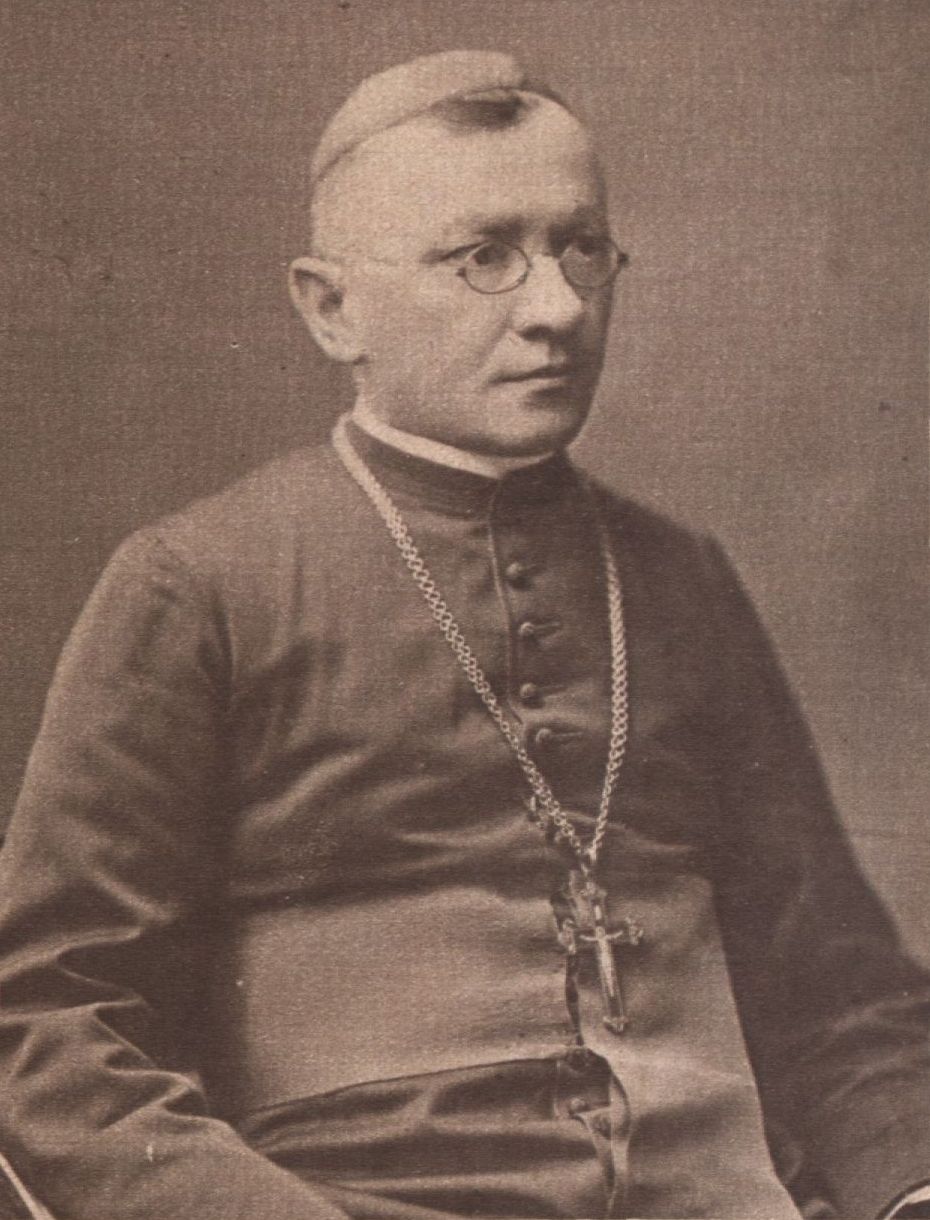
- Archbishop Bauer in 1914
- Church: Roman Catholic
- Archdiocese: Zagreb
- Appointed: 20 January 1911
- In office: 1914–1937
- Predecessor: Juraj Posilović
- Successor: Aloysius Stepinac
- Previous post: Coadjutor Archbishop of Zagreb (1911–1914)

Orders
- Ordination: 27 July 1879
- Consecration: 29 January 1911 by Rafael Merry del Val
- Rank: Metropolitan archbishop

Personal details
- Born: 11 February 1856 Breznica, Croatia, Austrian Empire (present day Croatia)
- Died: 7 December 1937 (aged 81) Zagreb, Yugoslavia (present day Croatia)

Antun Bauer (11 February 1856 – 7 December 1937) was a Croatian theologian and philosopher who served as Archbishop of Zagreb.

== Biography ==
He was born as Antun Bauer in Breznica, Croatia, hailing from a family of Burgenland Germans. He studied in Zagreb, Budapest, and Vienna, where he received his PhD in philosophy and theology in 1883. He was ordained on 27 July 1879. After returning from his studies, for a time was a chaplain in Zagreb, Ivanec and Samobor, and afterwards he worked for a few years in Zagreb as a catechist in the male teachers' training college and high school. In 1887 he was transferred to the Faculty of Theology, where he worked at first as a lecturer, then as an associate, and since 1904 as a full professor of philosophy and basic theology. In 1905–1906 and 1906–1907 he served as the Dean of the Theological Faculty, and in the period 1906–1907 as the Rector of the University of Zagreb. Since 1896 was an associate, and since in 1899 full member of the Yugoslav Academy of Sciences and Arts (from 1915 to his death also a sponsor).

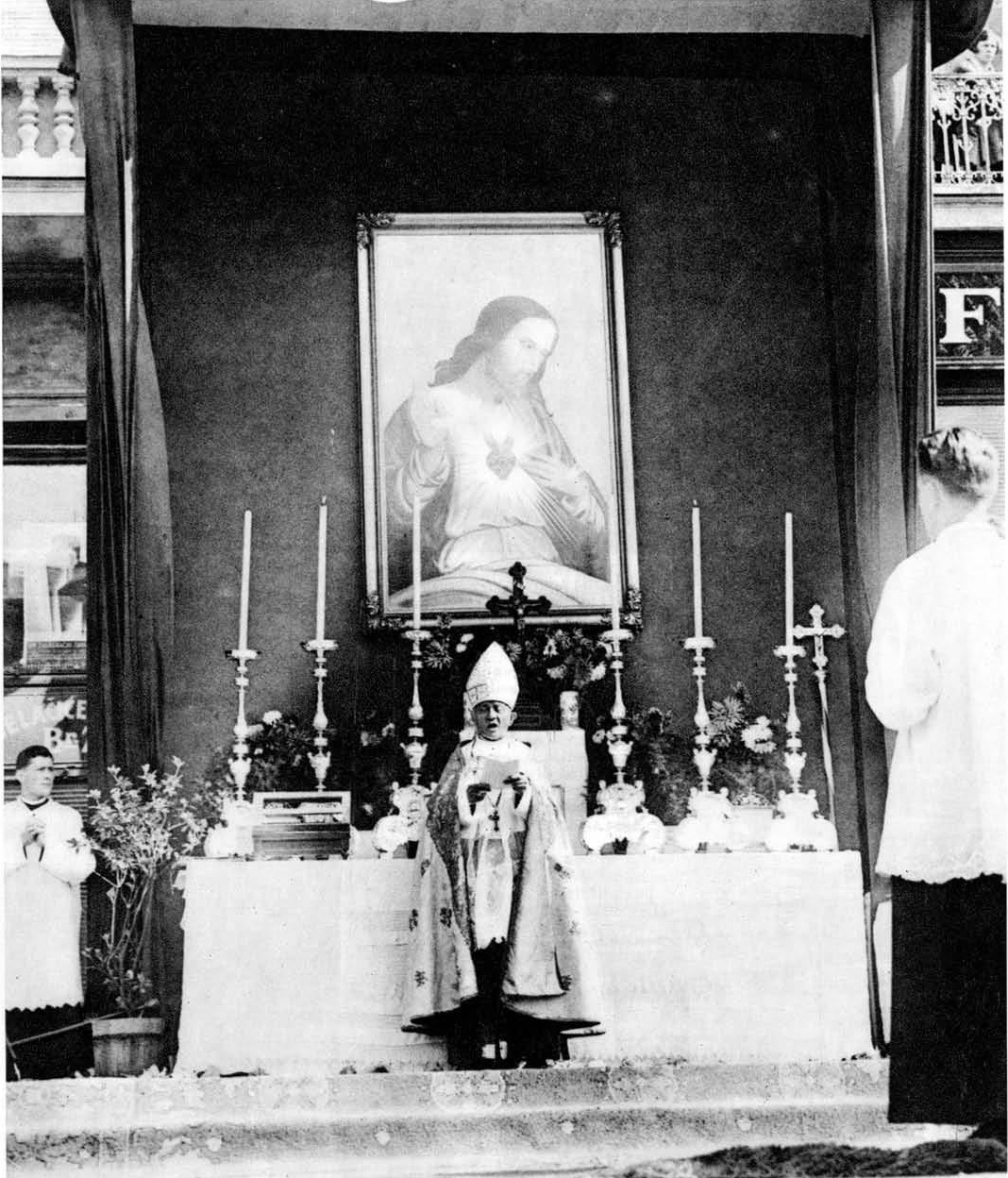
Archbishop Bauer 1930

In 1911 he was appointed coadjutor to Archbishop Juraj Posilović. On 26 April 1914 he took the management of the Zagreb Archdiocese. He was an editor (1886–1890) and a longtime collaborator of Katolički list and many other Catholic newsletters. In the period of 1885–1911 he was elected as a representative for five times, which enabled him to actively participate in the work of the Croatian Parliament. At first he was a member of the Party of Rights (Stranka prava), and afterward as a representative of Matica stranke prava, i.e. Udružena opozicija ("United Opposition"), and finally as a representative of the Croatian Party of Rights, whence he approached the Croatian-Serbian Coalition.

As an archbishop, Bauer mainly dealt with church affairs. At his instigation and under his presidency the Croatian Bishops' Conference was established in 1918. In 1925 he organized the first synod of the Archdiocese of Zagreb (after 1690). In 1922 he participated in the work of the commission for the preparation of the concordat. He is also credited for turning the Institute of St. Jerome into a national institution. Together with Đokovo bishop Antun Akšamović he built a seminary and high school in Zagreb. He also helped the reestablishment of Caritas in Croatia.

In the period up to 1914 Bauer had established himself as a prolific philosophical writer. In his philosophical and theological works he advocated the Neo-Thomist interpretation of metaphysics.

Bauer died in Zagreb on 7 December 1937.

== Works ==
- Područje materijalizma (1889; Zagreb)
- Bogoslav Šulek kao filozof i polemik (1890; Zagreb)
- Naravno bogoslovlje (1892; Zagreb)
- Teodiceja ili nauk o razumskoj spoznaji Boga (1918^{2}; Zagreb)
- Obća metafizika ili ontologija (1894, 1918^{2}; Zagreb).
- Wundtov metafizički sustav (Rad JAZU, 1896, 127, pp 209–248; 1897, 132, pp 48–102; 1900, 144, pp 1–39)
- Vjera i znanost (1906; Zagreb)
