= Netretić =

- Municipality
- Netretić Municipality; Općina Netretić
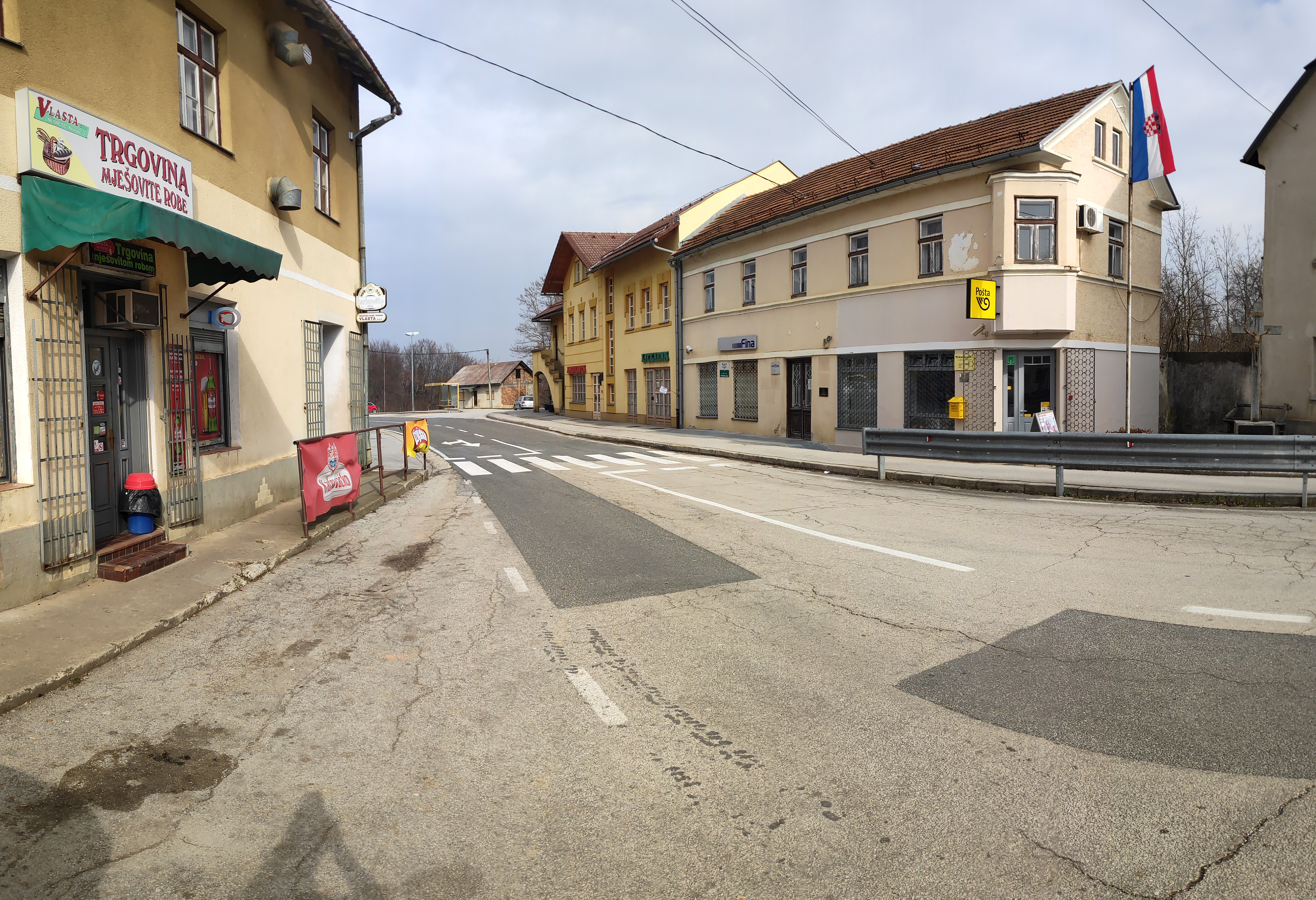
- Netretić, center

- Location within Croatia
- Coordinates: 45°30′34″N 15°24′45″E
- Country: Croatia
- County: Karlovac County

Government
  - Mayor: Marijan Peretić (HSS)

Area
  - Municipality: 113.6 km^{2} (43.9 sq mi)
  - Urban: 1.2 km^{2} (0.46 sq mi)

Population (2021)
  - Municipality: 2,439
  - Density: 21.47/km^{2} (55.61/sq mi)
  - Urban: 44
  - Urban density: 37/km^{2} (95/sq mi)
- Time zone: UTC+1 (CET)
  - Summer (DST): UTC+2 (CEST)
- Website: netretic.hr

Netretić is a village and a municipality in Karlovac County, Croatia. There are 2,862 inhabitants, 99% of whom are Croats.

The settlements in the municipality are:

- Baići (population 0)
- Bogovci (population 3)
- Brajakovo Brdo (population 116)
- Bukovje Netretićko (population 49)
- Culibrki (population 4)
- Donje Prilišće (population 80)
- Donje Stative (population 197)
- Dubravci (population 161)
- Dubravčani (population 243)
- Frketić Selo (population 74)
- Goli Vrh Netretićki (population 7)
- Gornje Prilišće (population 48)
- Jakovci Netretićki (population 21)
- Jarče Polje (population 127)
- Kolenovac (population 12)
- Kučevice (population 119)
- Kunići Ribnički (population 22)
- Ladešići (population 28)
- Lončar Brdo (population 5)
- Lonjgari (population 2)
- Maletići (population 144)
- Mali Modruš Potok (population 41)
- Mračin (population 263)
- Mrzljaki (population 17)
- Netretić (population 58)
- Novigrad na Dobri (population 85)
- Pavičići (population 2)
- Piščetke (population 15)
- Planina Kunićka (population 3)
- Račak (population 0)
- Rešetarevo (population 42)
- Rosopajnik (population 20)
- Skupica (population 144)
- Srednje Prilišće (population 24)
- Straža (population 79)
- Tončići (population 65)
- Veliki Modruš Potok (population 21)
- Vinski Vrh (population 111)
- Vukova Gorica (population 52)
- Zaborsko Selo (population 16)
- Zagradci (population 265)
- Završje Netretićko (population 77)

== Geography ==
Between Donje Kučevice and Bursići lie the Ponikve dolines.

== Bibliography ==
=== History ===
- Lopašić, Stjepan Ljuboje (1868-01-28). "Priposlano". Novi Pozor (in Croatian). Vol. 2, no. 110. p. 438. ISSN 1334-4862.
