= Račak =

Račak may refer to:

- Račak, Kosovo, a village near Shtime
- Račak, Croatia, a village near Netretić
