= Marija Trošt =

Coordinates: 45°25′N 14°49′E

- Village
- Interactive map of Marija Trošt
- Country: Croatia

Area
  - Total: 3.8 km^{2} (1.5 sq mi)

Population (2021)
  - Total: 38
  - Density: 10/km^{2} (26/sq mi)
- Time zone: UTC+1 (CET)
  - Summer (DST): UTC+2 (CEST)

Marija Trošt is a village in Croatia. It is connected by the D203 highway.
