= D203 road =

Road in Croatia

D203 state road

Route information
- Length: 11.2 km (7.0 mi)

Major junctions
- From: Brod na Kupi border crossing to Slovenia
- To: D3 in Delnice

Location
- Country: Croatia
- Counties: Primorje-Gorski Kotar
- Major cities: Delnice

Highway system
- Highways in Croatia

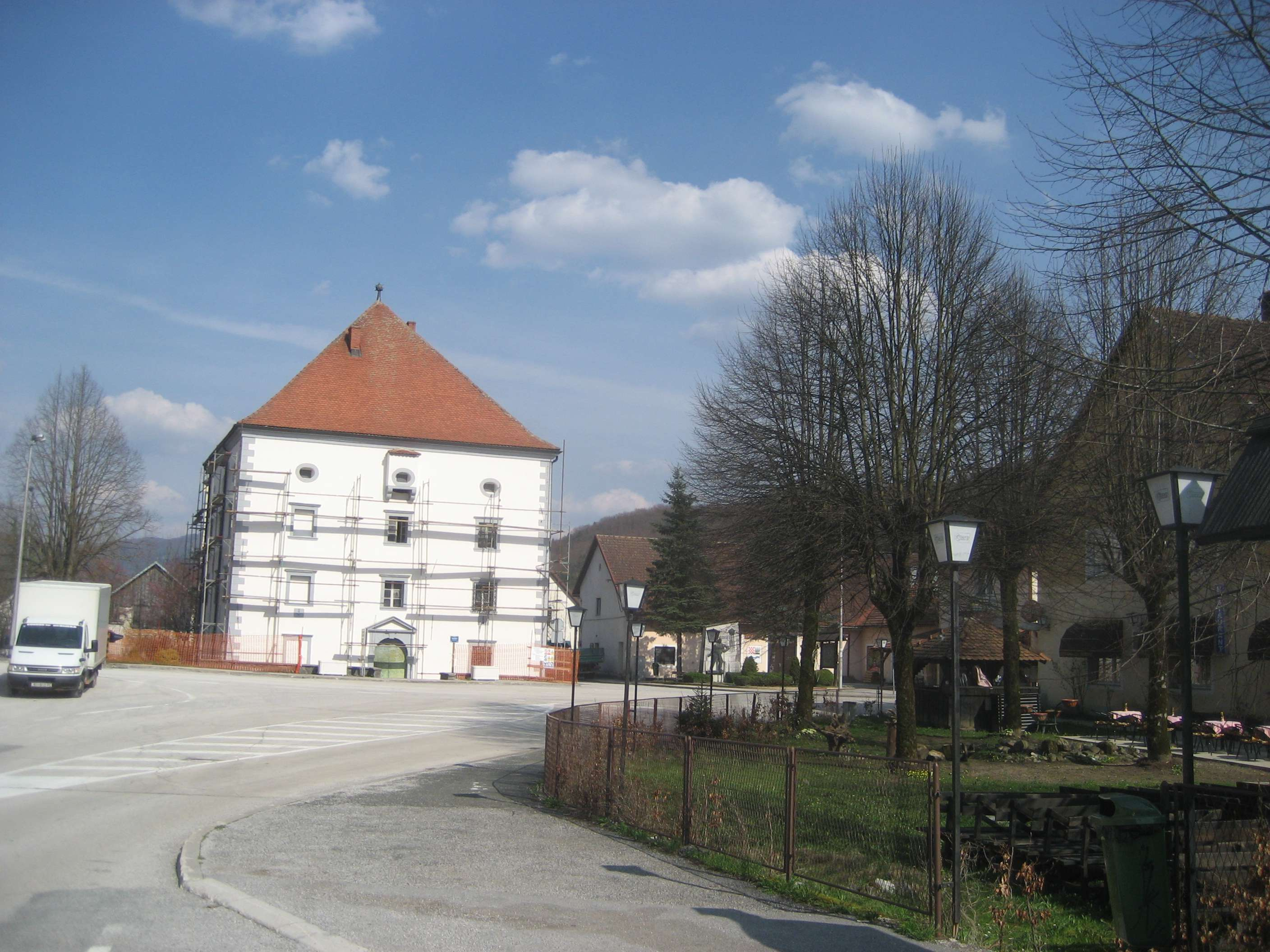
Brod na Kupi, at the northern terminus of the D203 road

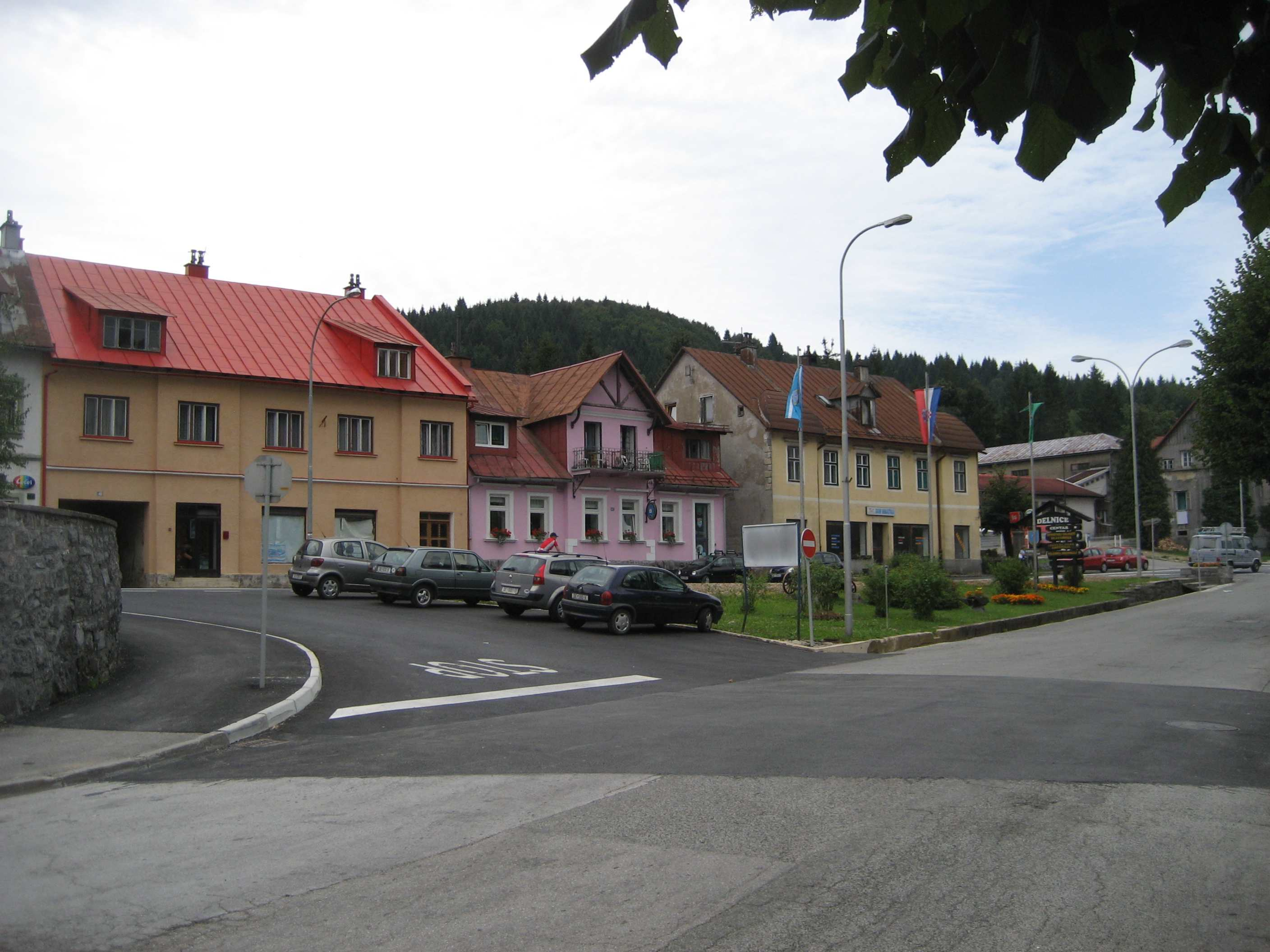
Delnice, at the southern terminus of the D203 road

D203 is a state road in Gorski Kotar region of Croatia connecting Brod na Kupi and nearby border crossing to Slovenia to D3 state road in Delnice, and the road also serves as a connecting road to the A6 motorway as it terminates near Delnice interchange. The road is 11.2 km (7.0 mi) long.

The D30 and all other state roads in Croatia are managed and maintained by Hrvatske ceste, state owned company.

== Traffic volume ==
Traffic is regularly counted and reported by Hrvatske ceste, operator of the road. Substantial variations between annual (AADT) and summer (ASDT) traffic volumes are attributed to the fact that the road serves as an approach to the Croatian A6 motorway carrying considerable tourist traffic.

D203 traffic volume
Road	Counting site	AADT	ASDT	Notes
D203	2902 Brod na Kupi	1,120	2,292	Between the Ž5033 and L58022 junctions.

== Road junctions and populated areas ==
D203 junctions/populated areas
Type	Slip roads/Notes
	Brod na Kupi border crossing to Slovenia. Slovenian route 106 to Kočevje, Slovenia. The northern terminus of the road.
	Brod na Kupi; Ž5033 to Gašparci border crossing to Slovenia (to the west) and to Brod Moravice (to the east).
	L58022 to Radočaj Brodski
	Marija Trošt
	Delnice; D3 to A6 motorway Delnice interchange and Rijeka (to the west) and to Karlovac (to the east). The southern terminus of the road.
