= Lužan Biškupečki =

- Village
- Location of Lužan Biškupečki in Croatia
- Coordinates: 46°13′N 16°21′E
- Country: Croatia
- County: Varaždin County
- Municipality: Gornji Kneginec

Area
  - Total: 3.3 km^{2} (1.3 sq mi)

Population (2021)
  - Total: 356
  - Density: 110/km^{2} (280/sq mi)
- Time zone: UTC+1 (CET)
  - Summer (DST): UTC+2 (CEST)
- Postal code: 42204 Turčin
- Area code: +385 (0)42

Lužan Biškupečki is a village in Croatia. It is connected by the D3 highway.
