= Marčelji =

- Coordinates: 45.396356°N 14.387017°E

Area
  - Total: 4.5 km^{2} (1.7 sq mi)

Population (2021)
  - Total: 2,535
  - Density: 560/km^{2} (1,500/sq mi)

Marčelji is a village in Primorje, Croatia, located north of Viškovo. The population is 2,148 (census 2011).
