= Soboli =

Coordinates: 45°22′N 14°30′E

- Village
- Interactive map of Soboli
- Country: Croatia
- County: Primorje-Gorski Kotar County
- Municipality: Čavle

Area
  - Total: 65.4 km^{2} (25.3 sq mi)

Population (2021)
  - Total: 178
  - Density: 2.72/km^{2} (7.05/sq mi)
- Time zone: UTC+1 (CET)
  - Summer (DST): UTC+2 (CEST)

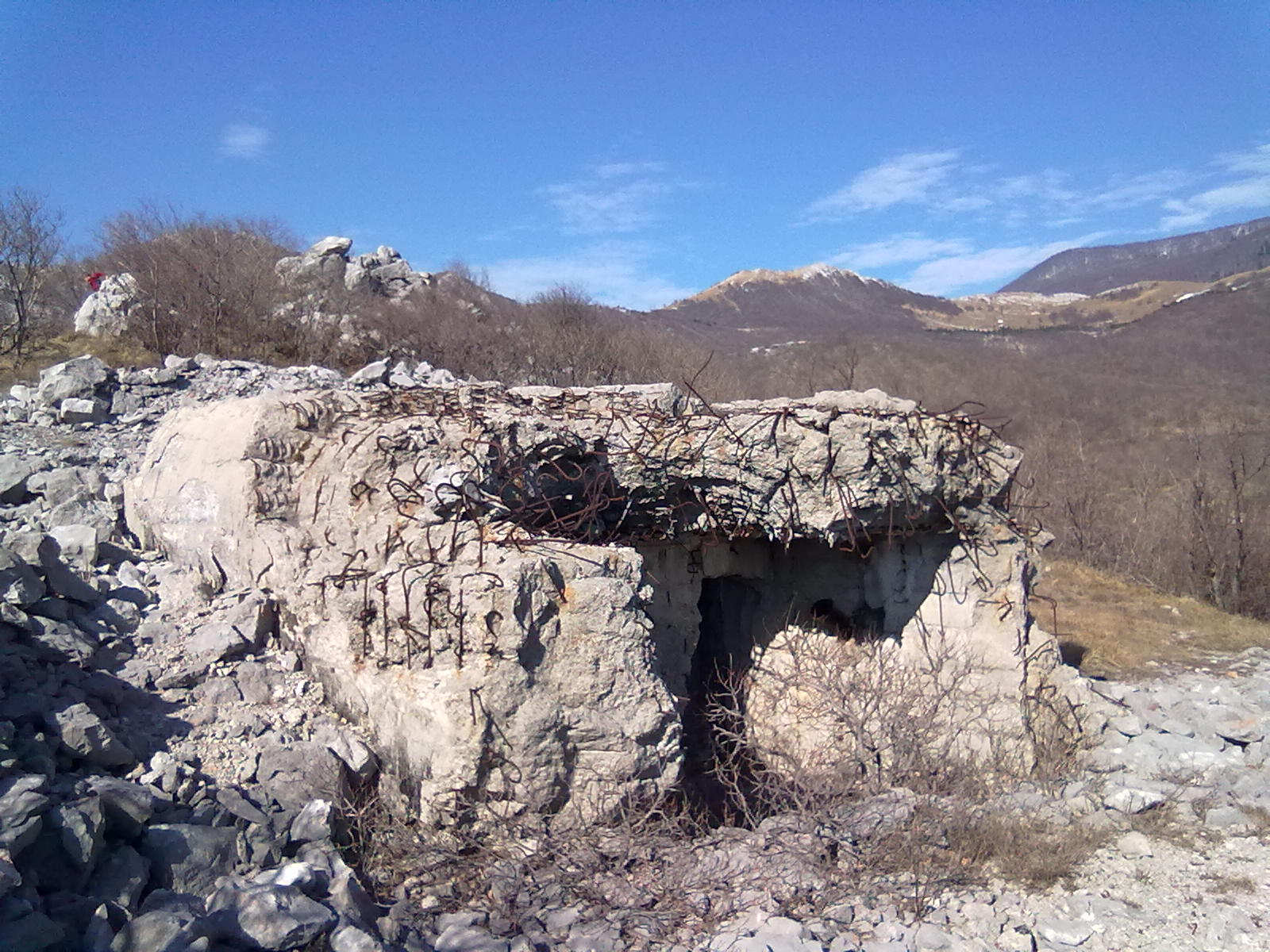
Soboli, Croatia

Soboli is a village in Croatia. It is connected by the D3 highway.

== History ==
From 31 January to 2 February 2014, while S and SW geostrophic wind dominated, freezing rain fell on Gorski Kotar, glazing the entire region. It wrecked roofs, power lines and forests, causing power loss for about 14,000 households in Gorski Kotar, or about 80% of its population. Because of power lines falling on the A6, the highway was closed in of Rijeka between Bosiljevo and Kikovica, and between Kikovica and Delnice in the direction of Zagreb. It took about 10 days to restore essential infrastructure to the region, and within months electricity was back in most of its former range, but at a cost of about 84.4 million HRK to HEP. At the time it was the largest peacetime damage since its Secession from Yugoslavia, even without counting the forestry losses. Clearing blocked forestry roads and forest paths would take years, and thanks to the declining population some were never cleared.
