= Gornji Kneginec =

- Municipality
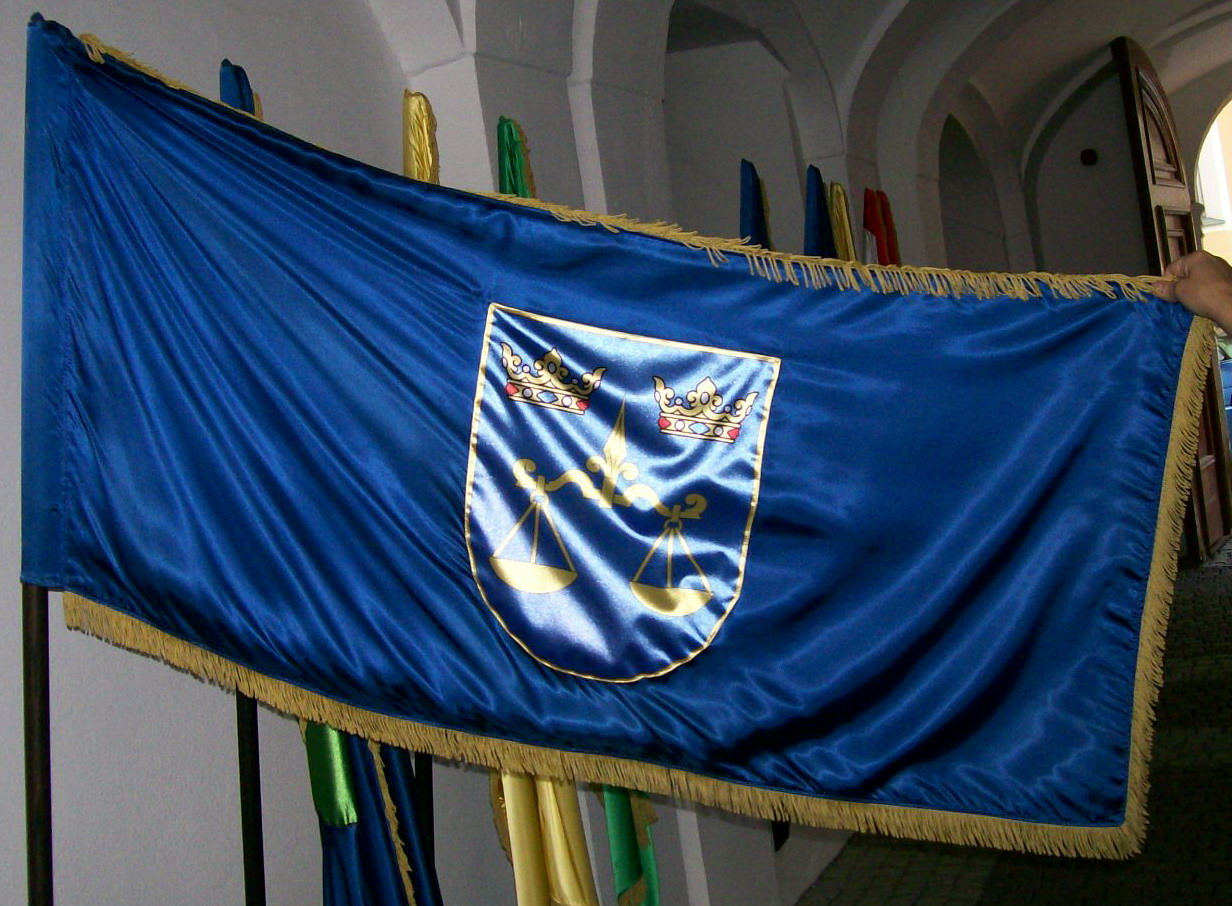
- Flag

- Location of Gornji Kneginec in Croatia
- Coordinates: 46°15′0″N 16°22′12″E
- Country: Croatia
- County: Varaždin County

Government
  - Municipal mayor: Goran Kaniški (HDZ)

Area
  - Municipality: 22.2 km^{2} (8.6 sq mi)
  - Urban: 2.8 km^{2} (1.1 sq mi)

Population (2021)
  - Municipality: 4,900
  - Density: 220/km^{2} (570/sq mi)
  - Urban: 1,430
  - Urban density: 510/km^{2} (1,300/sq mi)
- Time zone: UTC+1 (CET)
  - Summer (DST): UTC+2 (CEST)
- Postal code: 42204 Turčin
- Area code: +385 (0)42
- Website: kneginec.hr

Gornji Kneginec is a village and municipality in Croatia in Varaždin County.

The municipality is home to a monument to Croatian soldiers killed by Yugoslav Partisans in World War II and its aftermath.

== Demographics ==
According to the 2021 census, there are 4,900 inhabitants, in the following settlements:

- Donji Kneginec, population 650;
- Gornji Kneginec, population 1,430;
- Lužan Biškupečki, population 356;
- Turčin, population 803;
- Varaždin Breg, population 1,661.

The majority of inhabitants are Croats, making up 98.22% of the population.

Gornji Kneginec: Population trends 1857–2021
v

population	1512	1673	1752	2101	2416	1832	1960	3278	3893	4067	4275	4416	4787	4977	5259	5349	4900
	1857	1869	1880	1890	1900	1910	1921	1931	1948	1953	1961	1971	1981	1991	2001	2011	2021

Sources: Croatian Bureau of Statistics publications

== Administration ==
The current municipal mayor of Gornji Kneginec is Goran Kaniški (HDZ) and the Gornji Kneginec Municipal Council consists of 13 seats.

Groups	Councilors per group
HDZ	8 / 13
SDP	2 / 13
DKS-HSS BRAĆE RADIĆ-SUS	2 / 13
HNS-HSU-Independents-HDSS	1 / 13
