= Podstena =

Coordinates: 45.4208°N 14.9056°E

- Village
- Interactive map of Podstena
- Country: Croatia

Area
  - Total: 0.77 sq mi (2.0 km^{2})

Population (2021)
  - Total: 11
  - Density: 14/sq mi (5.5/km^{2})
- Time zone: UTC+1 (CET)
  - Summer (DST): UTC+2 (CEST)

Podstena is a village in Croatia. It is connected by the D3 highway.

== History ==
In 1860–1879, Matija Mažuranić wrote a 62 folio manuscript today titled Writings on the Building of Roads in Gorski Kotar and Lika (Croatian: Spisi o gradnji cesta u Gorskom Kotaru i Lici), today with signature HR-ZaNSK R 6424. A 21 folio manuscript dated 1872 titled Darstellung der Entstehung des Baues ... der Luisenstrasse together with a translation by I. Mikloušić is kept as HR-ZaNSK R 4572.

On 12 December 2017, a severe wind hit Podstena, blocking traffic to and from it.

== Sports ==
The "Gorski Kotar Bike Tour", held annually since 2012, sometimes goes through Podstena, such as in the third leg for 2023.
