= Mirkovec Breznički =

Coordinates: 46°01′55″N 16°17′13″E

- Village
- Interactive map of Mirkovec Breznički
- Country: Croatia
- County: Varaždin County
- Municipality: Breznica

Area
  - Total: 2.2 km^{2} (0.85 sq mi)

Population (2021)
  - Total: 87
  - Density: 40/km^{2} (100/sq mi)
- Time zone: UTC+1 (CET)
  - Summer (DST): UTC+2 (CEST)

Mirkovec Breznički is a village in Croatia with a population of 97 as of 2011. It is located within Breznica, Varazdin County. It is connected by the D3 highway.
