= Prilišće =

Prilišće may refer to:

- Donje Prilišće, a village in Croatia
- Gornje Prilišće, a village in Croatia
- Srednje Prilišće, a village in Croatia
