= Brajakovo Brdo =

- Village
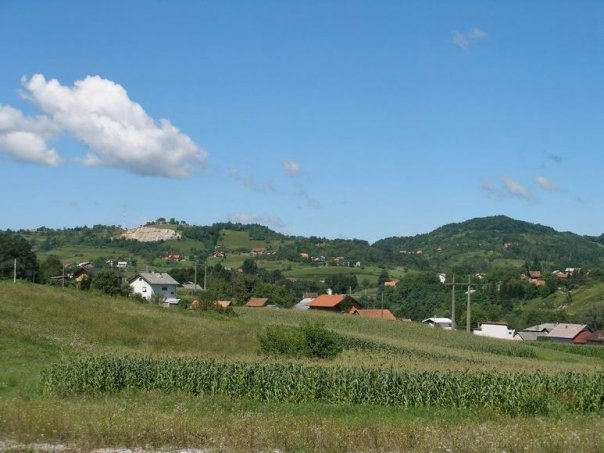

- Location within Croatia
- Coordinates: 45.510968°N 15.439213°E
- Country: Croatia
- County: Karlovac
- Municipality: Netretić

Area
  - Total: 4.5 km^{2} (1.7 sq mi)

Population (2021)
  - Total: 114
  - Density: 25/km^{2} (66/sq mi)
- Time zone: UTC+1 (CET)
  - Summer (DST): UTC+2 (CEST)

Brajakovo Brdo is a village in Croatia. It is connected by the D6 highway.

== See also ==
Brajakovo Brdo Population Trends and Demographics City Facts
