= Straža, Croatia =

Settlement in Karlovac County, Croatia

Straža
- Settlement
- Interactive map of Straža
- Location of Straža in Croatia
- Coordinates: 45°27′30″N 15°24′40″E
- Country: Croatia
- County: Karlovac County
- Municipality: Netretić

Area
  - Total: 4.1 km^{2} (1.6 sq mi)

Population (2021)
  - Total: 66
  - Density: 16/km^{2} (42/sq mi)
- Time zone: UTC+1 (CET)
  - Summer (DST): UTC+2 (CEST)
- Postal code: 47250 Duga Resa
- Area code: +385 (0)47

Straža is a settlement in the Municipality of Netretić in Croatia. In 2021, its population was 66.

== Demographics ==
Straža: Population trends 1857–2021
v

population	159	174	198	178	185	186	152	203	266	223	218	185	153	139	94	79	66
	1857	1869	1880	1890	1900	1910	1921	1931	1948	1953	1961	1971	1981	1991	2001	2011	2021

Sources: Croatian Bureau of Statistics publications
