= Feliks Suk =

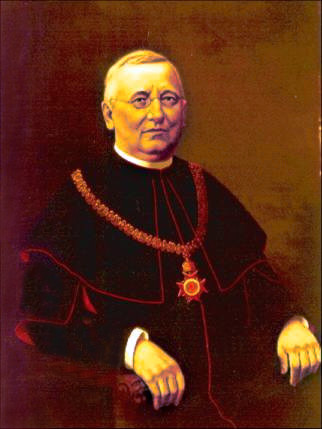
Feliks Suk, a painting by F. Ludvig, 1898

Feliks Suk (December 30, 1845 in Petelinek near Blagovica, Slovenia – April 8, 1915 in Zagreb) was a Croatian university professor and rector of the University of Zagreb.

It was Zagreb archbishop and cardinal Juraj Haulik who enabled young Suk a study of theology in Innsbruck. He was ordained for a priest in 1868. He received his Ph.D. in 1870. He conducted various jobs in the Zagreb Archdiocese, before he became a professor of moral theology at the newly established Royal University of Franz Joseph I. He served as a dean of the Faculty of Theology in two mandates. In the academic year 1882/1883 he served as a rector of the University of Zagreb, and the following academic year he served as a prorector.

He contributed to the periodicals Katolički list and Hrvatski učitelj, and authored several high school textbooks on Catholic apologetics and morality.

In his rectorship mandate the university has moved its headquarters from the Katarina's square to its today's building, back then at the very outskirts of the city in a region called Sajmište. The building originally built for a hospital in 1859 has been adapted in 1882 for the needs of university teaching. The solemn opening ceremony was held on November 5, 1882.

Academic offices
Preceded by Franjo Marković	Rector of the University of Zagreb; 1882 – 1883	Succeeded by Blaž Lorković
