= Dedin =

Coordinates: 45°23′07″N 14°51′04″E

- Village
- Interactive map of Dedin
- Country: Croatia
- County: Primorje-Gorski Kotar County
- Town: Delnice

Area
  - Total: 15.4 km^{2} (5.9 sq mi)

Population (2021)
  - Total: 154
  - Density: 10.0/km^{2} (25.9/sq mi)
- Time zone: UTC+1 (CET)
  - Summer (DST): UTC+2 (CEST)

Dedin is a small village in Croatia. It is connected by the D3 highway.

== History ==
In 1860–1879, Matija Mažuranić wrote a 62 folio manuscript today titled Writings on the Building of Roads in Gorski Kotar and Lika (Croatian: Spisi o gradnji cesta u Gorskom Kotaru i Lici), today with signature HR-ZaNSK R 6424. A 21 folio manuscript dated 1872 titled Darstellung der Entstehung des Baues ... der Luisenstrasse togethr with a translation by I. Mikloušić is kept as HR-ZaNSK R 4572.

On 29 September 2022, 113.54 millimetres (4.470 in) of rain fell in 3.5 hours at the Mala Poljana weather station above Dedin.

== Sports ==
Beginning in 2013, the 7 stage 260 kilometres (160 mi) long Cycling Trail of Gorski Kotar (Croatian: Goranska biciklistička transverzala) passes through Mala Poljana.

The "Gorski Kotar Bike Tour", held annually since 2012, sometimes goes through Dedin, such as in the second leg for 2024. The second leg for 2022 passed through Mala Poljana.
