= Saršoni =

- Village
- Interactive map of Saršoni
- Location within Croatia
- Coordinates: 45°23′18″N 14°24′33″E
- Country: Croatia
- County: Primorje-Gorski Kotar County
- Municipality: Viškovo

Area
  - Total: 3.6 km^{2} (1.4 sq mi)

Population (2021)
  - Total: 1,664
  - Density: 460/km^{2} (1,200/sq mi)
- Time zone: UTC+1 (CET)
  - Summer (DST): UTC+2 (CEST)

Saršoni is a village in Croatia.
