= Kuršanec =

- Village
- Location within Croatia
- Coordinates: 46°19′48″N 16°24′07″E
- Country: Croatia
- County: Međimurje County
- Municipality: Čakovec

Area
  - Total: 4.8 km^{2} (1.9 sq mi)

Population (2021)
  - Total: 1,727
  - Density: 360/km^{2} (930/sq mi)
- Time zone: UTC+1 (CET)
  - Summer (DST): UTC+2 (CEST)
- Postal code: 40000 Čakovec
- Area code: 040

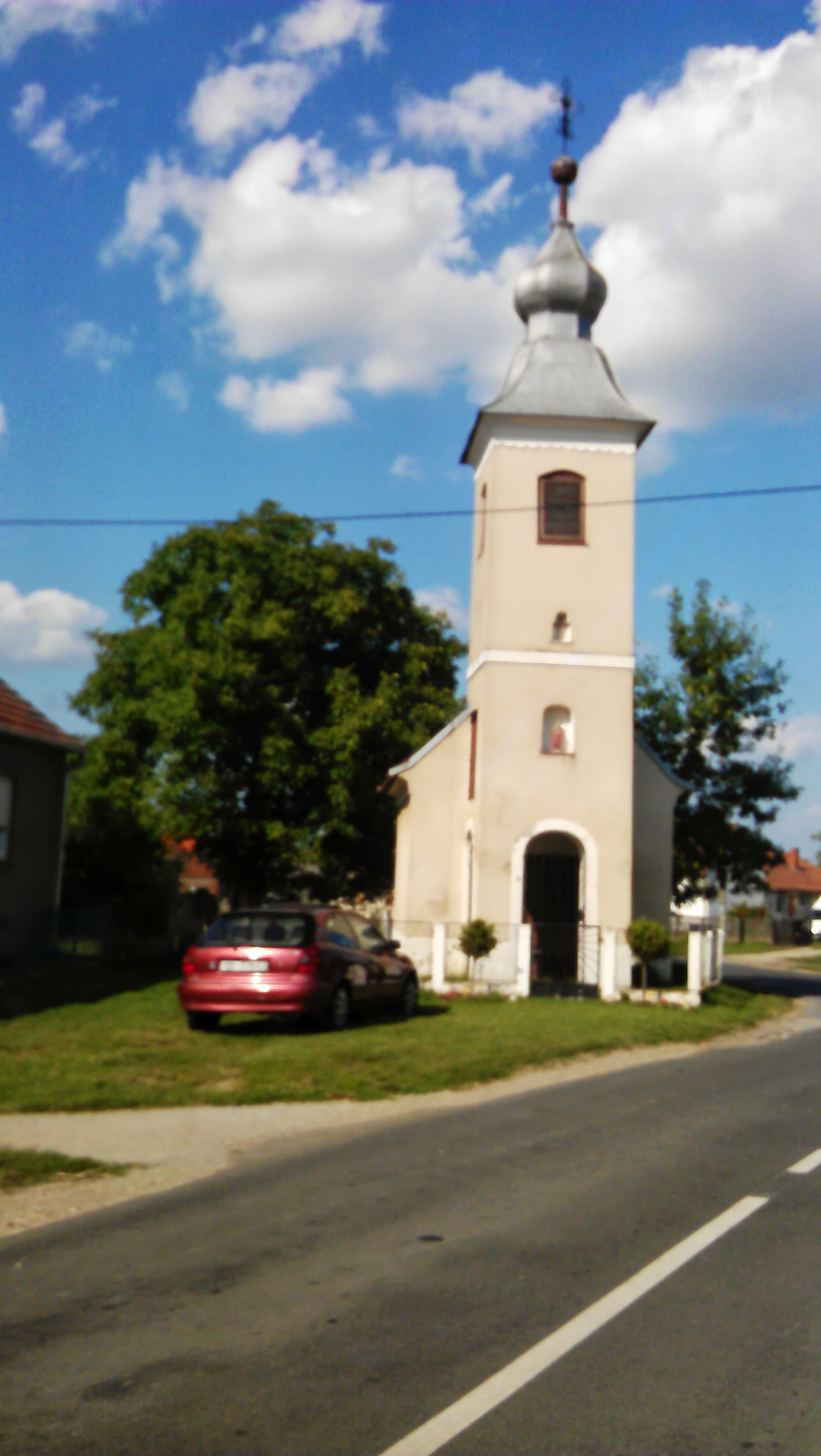
The church at Kuršanec

Kuršanec (Hungarian: Zrínyifalva, before 1896 Kursanecz) is a village in Međimurje County, Croatia.

The village is located in the south-western part of Međimurje County, near Lake Varaždin, and is administratively part of the wider area of the county seat, Čakovec. The centre of the city is located around 9 kilometres from the village. The centre of Varaždin, the county seat of Varaždin County, is located approximately 7 kilometres from the village. The population of Kuršanec in the 2011 census was 1,584.
