= Škalnica =

Coordinates: 45°27′N 14°20′E

- Village
- Interactive map of Škalnica
- Country: Croatia

Area
  - Total: 5.9 km^{2} (2.3 sq mi)

Population (2021)
  - Total: 236
  - Density: 40/km^{2} (100/sq mi)
- Time zone: UTC+1 (CET)
  - Summer (DST): UTC+2 (CEST)

Škalnica is a village in Croatia.

== History ==
The volunteer fire department DVD Škalnica was founded in 1979 with 32 members, though it did not obtain a vehicle until 1983. By 1988, it had 96 members. In 1990, a fire house was built for it.
