= Jarek Bisaški =

Coordinates: 46°03′N 16°16′E

- Village
- Interactive map of Jarek Bisaški
- Country: Croatia
- County: Varaždin County

Area
  - Total: 1.3 km^{2} (0.50 sq mi)

Population (2021)
  - Total: 187
  - Density: 140/km^{2} (370/sq mi)
- Time zone: UTC+1 (CET)
  - Summer (DST): UTC+2 (CEST)

Jarek Bisaški is a village in Croatia. It is connected by the D3 highway.
