= Dubravci, Karlovac County =

Dubravci
- Village
- Location within Croatia
- Coordinates: 45°27′11″N 15°26′35″E
- Country: Croatia
- County: Karlovac County

Area
  - Total: 2.1 km^{2} (0.81 sq mi)

Population (2021)
  - Total: 152
  - Density: 72/km^{2} (190/sq mi)
- Time zone: UTC+1 (CET)
  - Summer (DST): UTC+2 (CEST)

Dubravci is a village in Croatia. It is connected by the D3 highway.
