= Čavle =

- Municipality
- Čavle Municipality; Općina Čavle
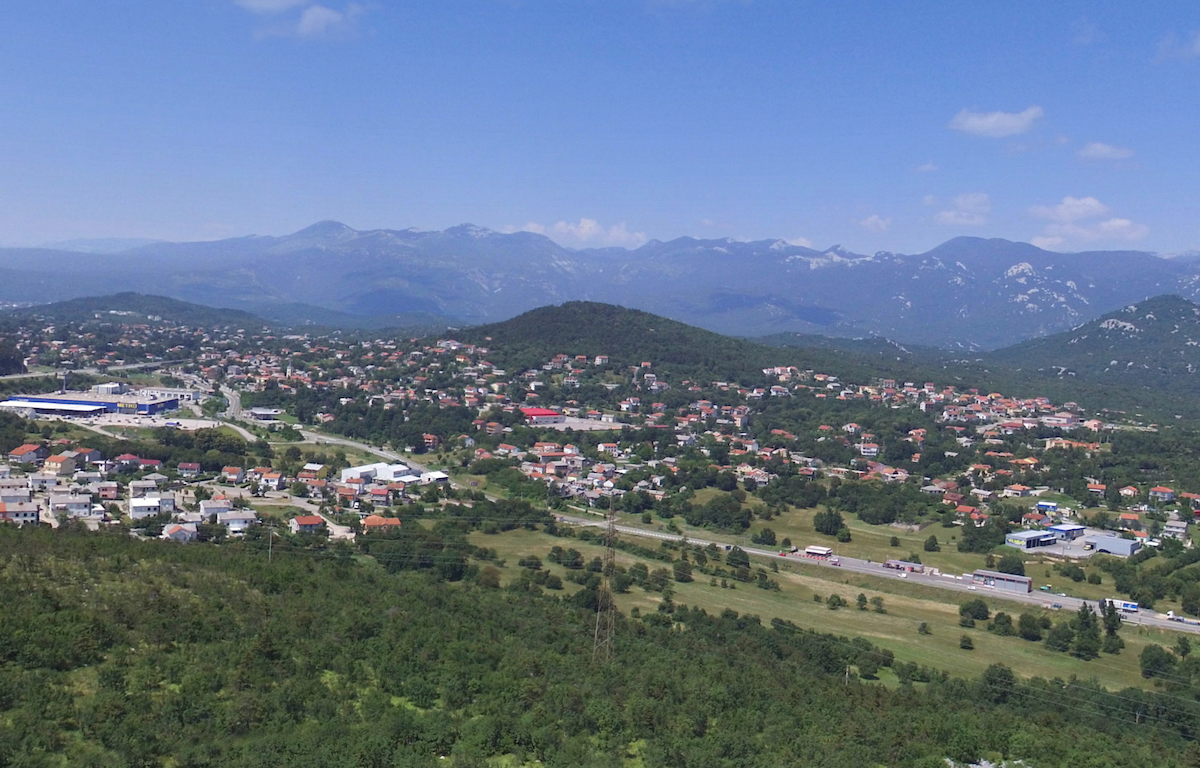
- Čavle

- Flag

- Location within Croatia
- Coordinates: 45°21′25″N 14°29′16″E
- Country: Croatia
- County: Primorje-Gorski Kotar County

Government
  - Mayor: Ivana Cvitan Polić (SDP)
  - City Council: 15 members: SDP-HNS-HSS-ARS-HL-HSU (8); HDZ-HSLS (4); _; PGS-IDS (2); _; AM-ŽZ (1)

Area
  - Municipality: 84.7 km^{2} (32.7 sq mi)
  - Urban: 2.1 km^{2} (0.81 sq mi)

Population (2021)
  - Municipality: 7,059
  - Density: 83.3/km^{2} (216/sq mi)
  - Urban: 1,269
  - Urban density: 600/km^{2} (1,600/sq mi)
- Time zone: UTC+1 (CET)
  - Summer (DST): UTC+2 (CEST)
- Postal code: 51218
- Area code: 051
- Website: cavle.hr

Čavle is a village and a municipality in the Primorje-Gorski Kotar County in western Croatia.

== History ==
A 22 December 1939 decision as part of agrarian reforms by Ban Šubašić to confiscate the forest property in Cernik and surroundings of the Thurn and Taxis family, Kálmán Ghyczy and Nikola Petrović resulted in a legal dispute known as the Thurn and Taxis Affair, in part because of the relative status of the family and in part because of the proximity to the Italian border.

== Demographics ==
In 1895, the obćina of Cernik (court at Čavle), with an area of 44 square kilometres (17 mi^{2}), belonged to the kotar of Sušak (Bakar court and electoral district) in the županija of Modruš-Rieka (Ogulin court and financial board). There were 271 houses, with a population of 1430. Its 4 villages and 9 hamlets were encompassed for taxation purposes by a single porezna obćina, under the Bakar office.

There are a total of 7,220 inhabitants, in the following settlements:

- Buzdohanj, population 1,517
- Cernik, population 1,397
- Čavle, population 1,358
- Grobnik, population 421
- Ilovik, population 14
- Mavrinci, population 1,021
- Podčudnič, population 470
- Podrvanj, population 461
- Soboli, population 172
- Zastenice, population 389

The population is 87.55% Croats.

The municipality of Čavle is known for many cultural events such as the "Sausage Open", followed by the Grobnička Maskarani Weekend, the "Polenta and Cheese Festival", the Folk Theater Festival and the Bartojski Kettle.

== Notable people ==
Notable people that were born or lived in Čavle include:

- Petar Klepac, legendary figure

== Bibliography ==
- Prusac, Stjepan (2023-09-26) [defended 2023-09-25]. Posjedi obitelji Thurn Taxis nakon 1918. godine [Thurn Taxis Estates in Croatia after First World War] (Thesis) (in Croatian). Zagreb: Filozofski fakultet Sveučilišta u Zagrebu.
- Banska vlast Banovine Hrvatske (1940b). "Gospodarska prosvjeta i banovinska dobra". Godišnjak banske vlasti Banovine Hrvatske. Vol. 1. pp. 89–96.
