= Marinići, Croatia =

Marinići
- Village
- Location within Croatia
- Coordinates: 45°22′N 14°24′E
- Country: Croatia
- County: Primorje-Gorski Kotar
- Municipality: Viškovo

Area
  - Total: 1.1 sq mi (2.9 km^{2})

Population (2021)
  - Total: 3,862
  - Density: 3,400/sq mi (1,300/km^{2})
- Time zone: UTC+1 (CET)
  - Summer (DST): UTC+2 (CEST)
- Postal code: 51216

Marinići is a village in Viškovo municipality, Croatia.
