= Viškovo =

- Municipality
- Viškovo Municipality; Općina Viškovo
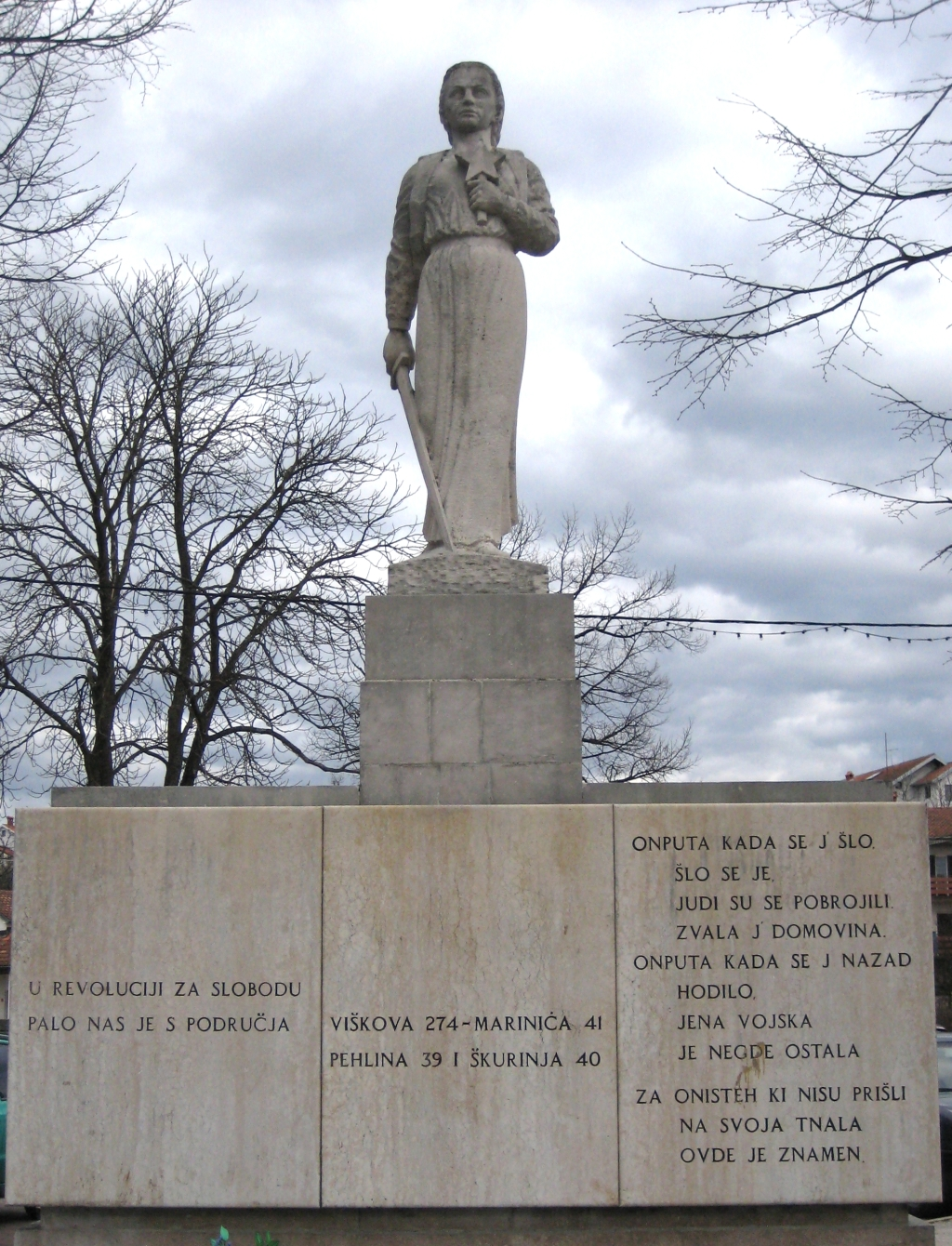
- Monument to fallen fighters

- Flag

- Location within Croatia
- Coordinates: 45°22′40″N 14°23′10″E
- Country: Croatia
- County: Primorje-Gorski Kotar County

Government
  - Mayor: Sanja Udović (Ind.)
  - City Council: 17 members: SDP-PGS-HSU-ARS-IDS (8); _; HDZ-HSS-BUZ (6); _; Independents (1); _; AM-ŽZ (1); _; Independents (1)

Area
  - Municipality: 18.7 km^{2} (7.2 sq mi)
  - Urban: 3.4 km^{2} (1.3 sq mi)

Population (2021)
  - Municipality: 16,084
  - Density: 860/km^{2} (2,230/sq mi)
  - Urban: 3,602
  - Urban density: 1,100/km^{2} (2,700/sq mi)
- Time zone: UTC+1 (CET)
  - Summer (DST): UTC+2 (CEST)
- Area code: 051
- Website: opcina-viskovo.hr

Viškovo is a city and a municipality in the Primorje-Gorski Kotar County in western Croatia.

== Population ==
In the 2011 census, there were a total of 14,445 inhabitants, in the following settlements:

- Kosi, population 808
- Marčelji, population 2,148
- Marinići, population 3,894
- Mladenići, population 1,254
- Saršoni, population 1,532
- Sroki, population 1,741
- Viškovo, population 3,068

In the same census, there were 85% Croats, 5.84% Serbs, 2.36% Bosniaks.

Historical population

Year	Pop.	±%
1857	2,263	—
1869	2,212	−2.3%
1880	2,333	+5.5%
1890	2,644	+13.3%
1900	3,000	+13.5%
1910	3,303	+10.1%
1921	3,082	−6.7%
1931	2,994	−2.9%
1948	2,159	−27.9%

Year	Pop.	±%
1953	2,134	−1.2%
1961	2,310	+8.2%
1971	2,629	+13.8%
1981	4,814	+83.1%
1991	6,918	+43.7%
2001	8,907	+28.8%
2011	14,445	+62.2%
2021	16,084	+11.3%

Source: Naselja i stanovništvo Republike Hrvatske 1857–2021, DZS

== History ==
Historians believe that the village of Viškovo was founded in the 18th century. It developed on Viškoven brege, so in the beginning the settlement was called Viškov breg or Viški.
