= Petrakovo Brdo =

Coordinates: 45°27′25″N 15°28′26″E

- Village
- Interactive map of Petrakovo Brdo
- Country: Croatia
- County: Karlovac County

Area
  - Total: 0.62 sq mi (1.6 km^{2})

Population (2021)
  - Total: 108
  - Density: 170/sq mi (67/km^{2})
- Time zone: UTC+1 (CET)
  - Summer (DST): UTC+2 (CEST)

Petrakovo Brdo is a village in Croatia. It is connected by the D3 highway.
