= Breznica, Croatia =

Breznica
- Municipality
- Location within Croatia
- Coordinates: 46°4′12″N 16°16′12″E
- Country: Croatia
- County: Varaždin County

Government
  - Municipal Mayor: Ivan Andrašek (HDZ)

Area
  - Municipality: 33.5 km^{2} (12.9 sq mi)
  - Urban: 10.3 km^{2} (4.0 sq mi)

Population (2021)
  - Municipality: 1,970
  - Density: 58.8/km^{2} (152/sq mi)
  - Urban: 749
  - Urban density: 72.7/km^{2} (188/sq mi)
- Time zone: UTC+1 (CET)
  - Summer (DST): UTC+2 (CEST)
- Website: breznica.hr

Breznica is a village and municipality in Varaždin County in Croatia.

== Demographics ==
In the 2021 census, the municipality had a population of 1,970 in the following settlements:

- Bisag, population 135
- Borenec, population 98
- Breznica, population 749
- Čret Bisaški, population 18
- Drašković, population 375
- Jales Breznički, population 114
- Jarek Bisaški, population 187
- Mirkovec Breznički, population 87
- Podvorec, population 141
- Tkalec, population 66

The majority of inhabitants are Croats, making up 99.19% of the population.

Breznica: Population trends 1857–2021
v

population	1172	1356	1484	1951	2336	2831	2917	3402	3748	3673	3490	3125	2801	2573	2304	2200	1970
	1857	1869	1880	1890	1900	1910	1921	1931	1948	1953	1961	1971	1981	1991	2001	2011	2021

Sources: Croatian Bureau of Statistics publications

== Administration ==
The current municipal mayor of Breznica is Ivan Andrašek (HDZ) and the Breznica Municipal Council consists of 9 seats.

Groups	Councilors per group
HSS-HDZ-SUS	5 / 9
HS-Most-HSS-SR-BUZ-DOMiNO	4 / 9
