= Zaistovec =

Coordinates: 46°02′N 16°22′E

- Village
- Interactive map of Zaistovec
- Country: Croatia
- County: Koprivnica-Križevci County

Area
  - Total: 9.2 km^{2} (3.6 sq mi)

Population (2021)
  - Total: 229
  - Density: 25/km^{2} (64/sq mi)
- Time zone: UTC+1 (CET)
  - Summer (DST): UTC+2 (CEST)

Zaistovec is a village in Croatia.
