= Križanec =

Coordinates: 46°14′40″N 16°20′45″E

- Village
- Interactive map of Križanec
- Country: Croatia

Area
  - Total: 0.9 km^{2} (0.35 sq mi)

Population (2021)
  - Total: 285
  - Density: 320/km^{2} (820/sq mi)
- Time zone: UTC+1 (CET)
  - Summer (DST): UTC+2 (CEST)

Križanec is a village in Croatia. It is connected by the D3 highway.
