= Biškupec Zelinski =

- Settlement
- Location of Biškupec Zelinski within Croatia
- Coordinates: 45°57′N 16°13′E
- Country: Croatia
- County: Zagreb County
- Municipality: Sveti Ivan Zelina

Area
  - Total: 2.7 km^{2} (1.0 sq mi)
- Elevation: 90 m (300 ft)

Population (2021)
  - Total: 889
  - Density: 330/km^{2} (850/sq mi)
- Time zone: UTC+1 (CET)
  - Summer (DST): UTC+2 (CEST)
- Postal code: 10380 Sveti Ivan Zelina

Biškupec Zelinski is a village in Croatia. It is connected by the D3 highway.
