= Podvorec =

- Location within Croatia
- Coordinates: 46°01′59″N 16°16′59″E
- Country: Croatia
- County: Varaždin County
- Municipality: Breznica

Area
  - Total: 1.1 km^{2} (0.42 sq mi)

Population (2021)
  - Total: 141
  - Density: 130/km^{2} (330/sq mi)
- Time zone: UTC+1 (CET)
  - Summer (DST): UTC+2 (CEST)

Podvorec is a residential area located within the administrative boundaries of the municipality of Breznica in the Varaždin County, Republic of Croatia. Geographically, the area is characterized by predominantly hilly topography, typical of the Hrvatsko zagorje region.

According to the population census data from 2021, Podvorec had 141 inhabitants. The settlement is of importance to the municipality of Breznica as it contributes to the overall demographic and territorial context.
