= Beletinec =

Coordinates: 46°13′N 16°19′E

- Village
- Interactive map of Beletinec
- Country: Croatia
- County: Varaždin County

Area
  - Total: 5.1 km^{2} (2.0 sq mi)

Population (2021)
  - Total: 865
  - Density: 170/km^{2} (440/sq mi)
- Time zone: UTC+1 (CET)
  - Summer (DST): UTC+2 (CEST)

Beletinec is a village in Croatia.
