= Tomaševec Biškupečki =

Coordinates: 46°15′00″N 16°21′14″E

- Village
- Interactive map of Tomaševec Biškupečki
- Country: Croatia

Area
  - Total: 0.46 sq mi (1.2 km^{2})

Population (2021)
  - Total: 339
  - Density: 730/sq mi (280/km^{2})
- Time zone: UTC+1 (CET)
  - Summer (DST): UTC+2 (CEST)

Tomaševec Biškupečki is a village in Croatia.
