= Jarče Polje =

Coordinates: 45°26′49″N 15°24′00″E

- Village
- Interactive map of Jarče Polje
- Country: Croatia
- County: Karlovac County

Area
  - Total: 3.9 km^{2} (1.5 sq mi)

Population (2021)
  - Total: 119
  - Density: 31/km^{2} (79/sq mi)
- Time zone: UTC+1 (CET)
  - Summer (DST): UTC+2 (CEST)

Jarče Polje is a village in Croatia. It is connected by the D3 highway.
