= Gornje Mrzlo Polje Mrežničko =

Coordinates: 45°28′01″N 15°30′11″E

- Village
- Interactive map of Gornje Mrzlo Polje Mrežničko
- Country: Croatia
- County: Karlovac County

Area
  - Total: 5.5 km^{2} (2.1 sq mi)

Population (2021)
  - Total: 544
  - Density: 99/km^{2} (260/sq mi)
- Time zone: UTC+1 (CET)
  - Summer (DST): UTC+2 (CEST)

Gornje Mrzlo Polje Mrežničko (lit. "Upper Cold Field of Mrežnica") is a village in Croatia. It is connected by the D3 highway. It is around 50 kilometers (31 mi) southwest of Zagreb. This village has the longest settlement name in Croatia.
