= Račak, Croatia =

Settlement in Karlovac County, Croatia

Račak
- Settlement
- Interactive map of Račak
- Location of Račak in Croatia
- Coordinates: 45°26′10″N 15°20′10″E
- Country: Croatia
- County: Karlovac County
- Municipality: Netretić

Area
  - Total: 2.4 km^{2} (0.93 sq mi)

Population (2021)
  - Total: 0
  - Density: 0.0/km^{2} (0.0/sq mi)
- Time zone: UTC+1 (CET)
  - Summer (DST): UTC+2 (CEST)
- Postal code: 47000 Karlovac
- Area code: +385 (0)47

Račak is a settlement in the Municipality of Netretić in Croatia. In 2021, its population was 0.

== Demographics ==
Račak: Population trends 1857–2021
v

population	32	36	41	33	28	23	34	37	32	27	10	9	6	12	5
	1857	1869	1880	1890	1900	1910	1921	1931	1948	1953	1961	1971	1981	1991	2001	2011	2021

Sources: Croatian Bureau of Statistics publications
