= Donje Mrzlo Polje Mrežničko =

- Village
- Location within Croatia
- Coordinates: 45°27′43″N 15°30′04″E
- Country: Croatia

Area
  - Total: 1.2 sq mi (3.2 km^{2})

Population (2021)
  - Total: 507
  - Density: 410/sq mi (160/km^{2})
- Time zone: UTC+1 (CET)
  - Summer (DST): UTC+2 (CEST)

Donje Mrzlo Polje Mrežničko (lit. "Lower Cold Field of Mrežnica") is a village in Croatia. It is around 50 kilometers southwest of Zagreb.
