= D22 road (Croatia) =

State road in Croatia

D22 state road

Route information
- Length: 42.7 km (26.5 mi)

Major junctions
- From: D3 and D24 in Novi Marof
- A4 in Novi Marof interchange D41 in Križevci D10 in Križevci interchange
- To: D28 in Sveti Ivan Žabno

Location
- Country: Croatia
- Counties: Varaždin, Koprivnica-Križevci
- Major cities: Novi Marof, Križevci, Sveti Ivan Žabno

Highway system
- Highways in Croatia

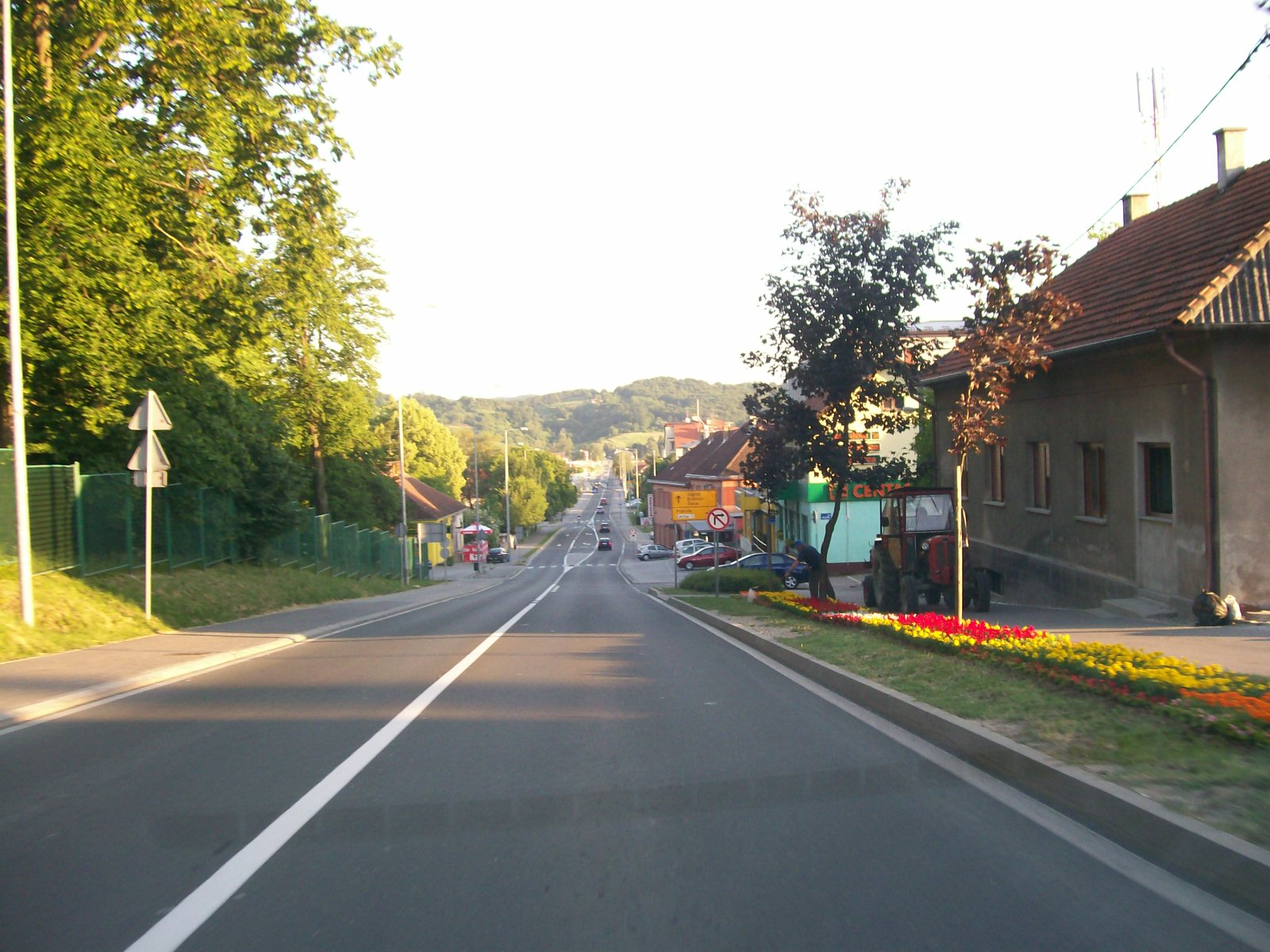
Novi Marof, at the western terminus of the D22 road

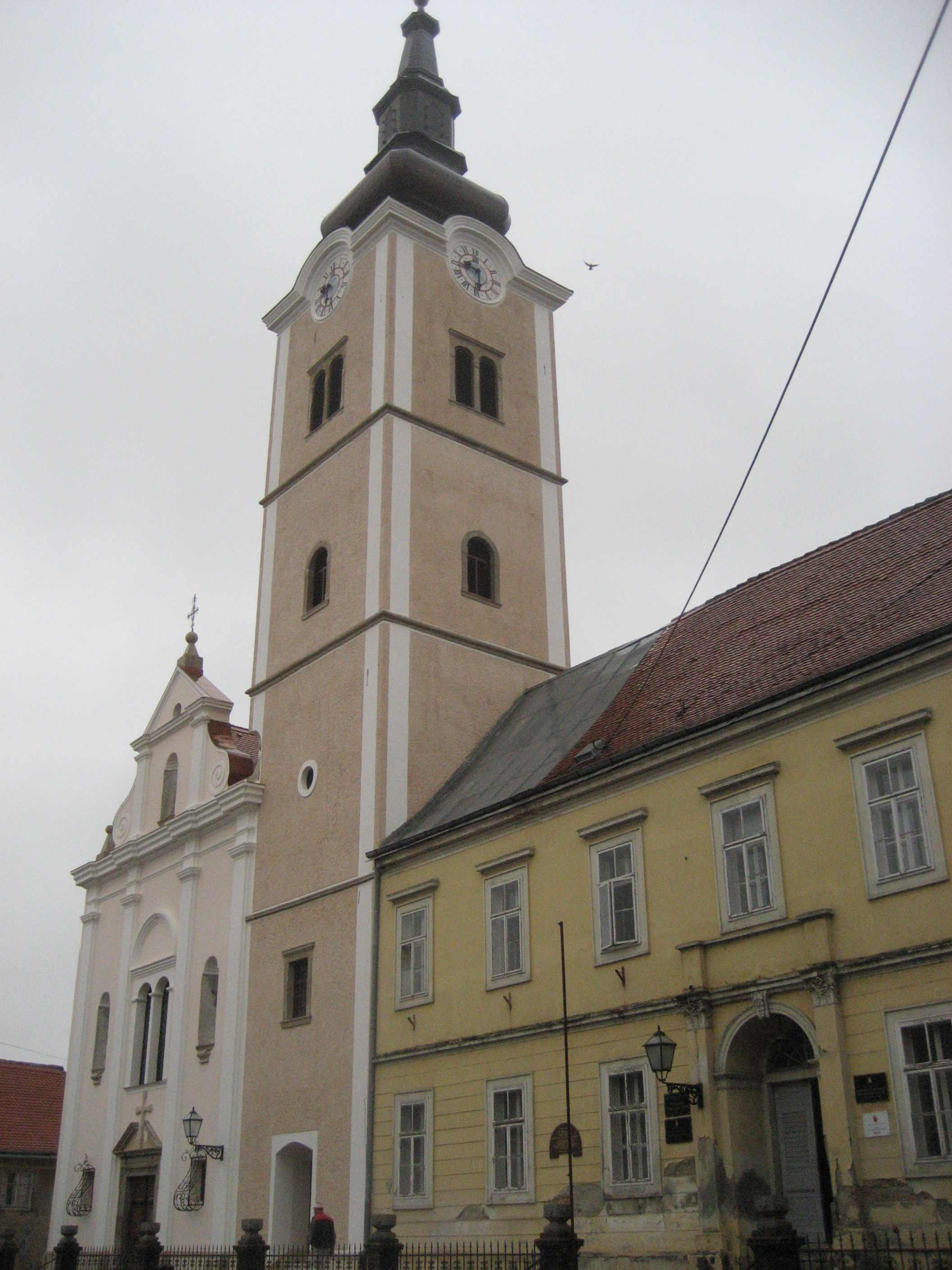
Križevci, on the D22 road route

D22 is a state road in the central Croatia connecting Novi Marof via Križevci, to the Sveti Ivan Žabno. The road is 42.7 km (26.5 mi) long. (Note: Overview map of the D22 (Map). OpenStreetMap.)

Like all state roads in Croatia, the D22 is managed and maintained by Hrvatske ceste, a state-owned company.

== Traffic volume ==
Traffic is regularly counted and reported by Hrvatske ceste, operator of the road.

D22 traffic volume
Road	Counting site	AADT	ASDT	Notes
D22	1233 Možđenec	2,892	2,919	Between the D3 and D24 junction.
D22	1228 Vukovec	1,142	1,306	Adjacent to the L26003 junction.
D22	2125 Trema	2,375	2,286	Adjacent to the Ž2228 junction.

== Road junctions and populated areas ==
D22 junctions/populated areas
Type	Slip roads/Notes
	Novi Marof; D3 to Varaždin (D2) (to the north) and to Sveti Ivan Zelina (to the south). D24 to Zabok (to the west) - the D22 and D24 are concurrent to the east. The western terminus of the road.
	A4 Novi Marof interchange to Varaždin and Zagreb. D24 to Varaždinske Toplice (D526) and Ludbreg (D2) (to the east). The D22 and D24 are concurrent to the west.
	Možđenec; Ž2135 to Grana.
	Sudovec; Ž2175 to Visoko.
	Gornja Rijeka
	Dropkovec
	Vukovec
	Finčevec
	Sveti Petar Orehovec; Ž2176 to Miholec. Ž2177 to Selanec.
	Ž2138 to Selanec and Kalnik.
	Guščerovec; Ž2178 to Bočkovec.
	Križevci; D41 to Koprivnica (D2) (to the north) and to Vrbovec and D10 expressway Vrbovec 1 interchange (to the south). Ž2089 to Apatovec and Ludbreg. Ž2179 to Sveta Helena. Ž2209 within the city. Ž2210 to Veliki Potočec.
	Križevci interchange D10 expressway to Sveta Helena interchange (A4) (to the south).
	Cubinec; Ž2211 to Poljana Križevačka and Dubrava (D26).
	Bukovje Križevačko
	Ž2228 to Trema.
	Sveti Ivan Žabno; D28 to the D10 expressway Gradec interchange (to the south) and to Bjelovar (D43) and Veliki Zdenci (D5) (to the east). The eastern terminus of the road.
