= Švarc =

Notable people with the surname Švarc or Svarc include:

- Alfred Švarc (1907–1986), Croatian composer and lawyer
- Božo Švarc (1920–2007) Yugoslav–Jewish athlete, political activist, and World War II veteran
- Branko Švarc (1894–1972), Croatian judge and mayor of Koprivnica
- Ladislav Švarc (born 1978), former professional tennis player from Slovakia
- Přemysl Švarc (born 1985), Czech triathlete
- Bobby Svarc (born 1946), English former professional footballer who played as a forward
- Cathy Svarc (born 1991), Australian rules footballer
- Ruby Svarc (born 1993), Australian rules footballer
- Ivana Švarc-Grenda (born 1970), Croatian pianist

== See also ==
- Švarc–Milnor lemma
- SK Benešov, formerly known as FK Švarc Benešov
