= Péter Keglevich =

Croatian nobleman and military officer

Peter VII Keglevich of Buzin

Lieutenant of Ban of Croatia
- In office 1702–1712
- Monarchs: Leopold I Joseph I Charles VI
- Governors General: Adam II Batthyány; János Pálffy

Veliki župan of the Požega County
- In office 1707–1724
- Monarchs: Joseph I Charles VI
- Succeeded by: Ladislaus II Keglevich

Personal details
- Born: c. 1660 Lobor, Kingdom of Croatia, Habsburg monarchy
- Died: 30 May 1724 (aged 63–64) Lobor, Kingdom of Croatia, Habsburg monarchy
- Spouse: Maria Johanna Orehóczy (m. 1962)
- Children: 3
- Relatives: Keglević family
- Education: University of Graz

Military service
- Allegiance: Habsburg Monarchy Kingdom of Croatia
- Branch/service: Imperial Army
- Rank: General
- Battles/wars: Great Turkish War: Battle of Vienna; Rákóczi's War of Independence

Peter VII Keglevich of Buzin (Croatian: Petar VII. Keglević Bužimski; c. 1660 – 30 May 1724) was a Croatian nobleman, governor and military officer. A member of the Keglević family was a Commander-in-chief, Imperial Army General, Lieutenant of Ban (Viceroy) of Croatia and a Croatian count.

== Family ==
Keglevich was born to Baron Ladislaus (Croatian: Ladislav; Hungarian: László; ) Keglevich (1640–1665) and Rosina Rattkay (Croatian: Ratkaj) of Great Tabor, a castle in northern Croatia. His paternal grandfather was Peter V Keglevich (1609–1665) who was a military commander and chronicler. His paternal grand-grandfather was Miklós Istvánffy, Hungarian politician, Humanist historian and poet. He was a descendant of Petar II Keglević who was a Ban of Croatia from 1537 to 1542.

== Life and career ==
Keglevich earned his degree in philosophy from the University of Graz in 1679. He acquired the estate in lands of Mali Kalnik and Guščerovec by his marriage in c. 1962. After a 1690–1699 lawsuit with Zagreb Kaptol and Sišćani, he gained the estate in lands of Blinja and Totuševina.

Keglevich took part in the Great Turkish War, notably distinguishing himself during the Battle of Vienna in 1683 when he gathered an army and cared about them at his own expense — at the 1687 parliament meeting in Požun, King of Hungary and Croatia Leopold I of Habsburg granted him the Count's title for military merit. Also, Leopold named him a royal advisor in 1694. In the same year, Keglevich became a Commander-in-chief in Kostajnica for a part of the Banovina in the Una Valley. On 19 September 1698, Keglevich issued a land charter (Croatian: Slabinjska povelja) to the people of Slabinja as a reward for their service in the Great Turkish War and a defence of the Croatian Military Frontier. On duty in Kostajnica, he was also mentioned in 1699–1701. Keglevich participated in drafting particular articles for the Treaty of Karlowitz in 1699 and was a member of several parliamentary committees for boundary delimitation with the Ottoman Empire.

From 1702 he held the office of a lieutenant (Croatian: namjesnik) of Ban of Croatia for military and political affairs. After the death of Adam II Batthyány, in 1703, was a candidate for the Ban but was not elected. During the Rákóczi's War of Independence, Keglevich was in charge of the defence at the border on the Drava river. King Leopold appointed him a Commander-in-Chief of the Kingdom of Croatia Army in 1705.

King Joseph I appointed him a governor (Croatian: veliki župan) of Požega County in 1707 and a Commander-in-Chief of Border Troops in 1708. After retiring from his duties as the Deputy Ban in 1712 due to illness, Keglevich was a member of the border commission for the Croatian Military Frontier borders on the Sava River, towards Carniola and on the Una River.

Keglevich arranged the book publication of Pavao Ritter Vitezović Bossna Captiva in Trnava in 1712. In 1705 or 1707, Keglevich built the Saint Joseph's Chapel on a hill above the Franciscan monastery of Saint Catherine in Krapina. In 1713, he funded the painting and gilding of the altar of the monastery church and built a statue of Saint Mary in front of the church. In 1714, he rebuilt the Krapina Castle.

Peter Keglevich was buried in a Franciscan church in Krapina.

== Marriage and issue ==
He was married to Countess Maria Johanna Orehóczy of Orehocz (Croatian: Marija Ivana Orehovečki; c. 1668–1738), a daughter of Count Stephen Orehóczy in c. 1962. They had three children;

- Count Ladislaus (László) II Keglevich (c. 1693–1750); married on 15 July 1722 in Vienna, to Lady Franziska Thavonat von Thavon (1704–unknown). They had a son:
  - Count Péter VIII Keglevich (1721–1749).
- Countess Kristina Marija Keglevich (c. 1698–1750);
- Count Alexander (Sándor) Keglevich (1706–1752); married in 1736 to Countess Maria Anna Petazzi of San-Servolo and Castell-Novo. They had a son:
  - Count Julius Keglevich (unknown–1810)
