= Peter Keglevic (disambiguation) =

Peter Keglevic may refer to:

- Petar Keglević (died in 1554 or 1555), ban of Croatia and Slavonia
- Péter Keglevich (1660–1724), Croatian nobleman, governor and military officer
- Peter Keglevic (born 1950), Austrian film director and screenwriter
