= Sveti Petar Orehovec =

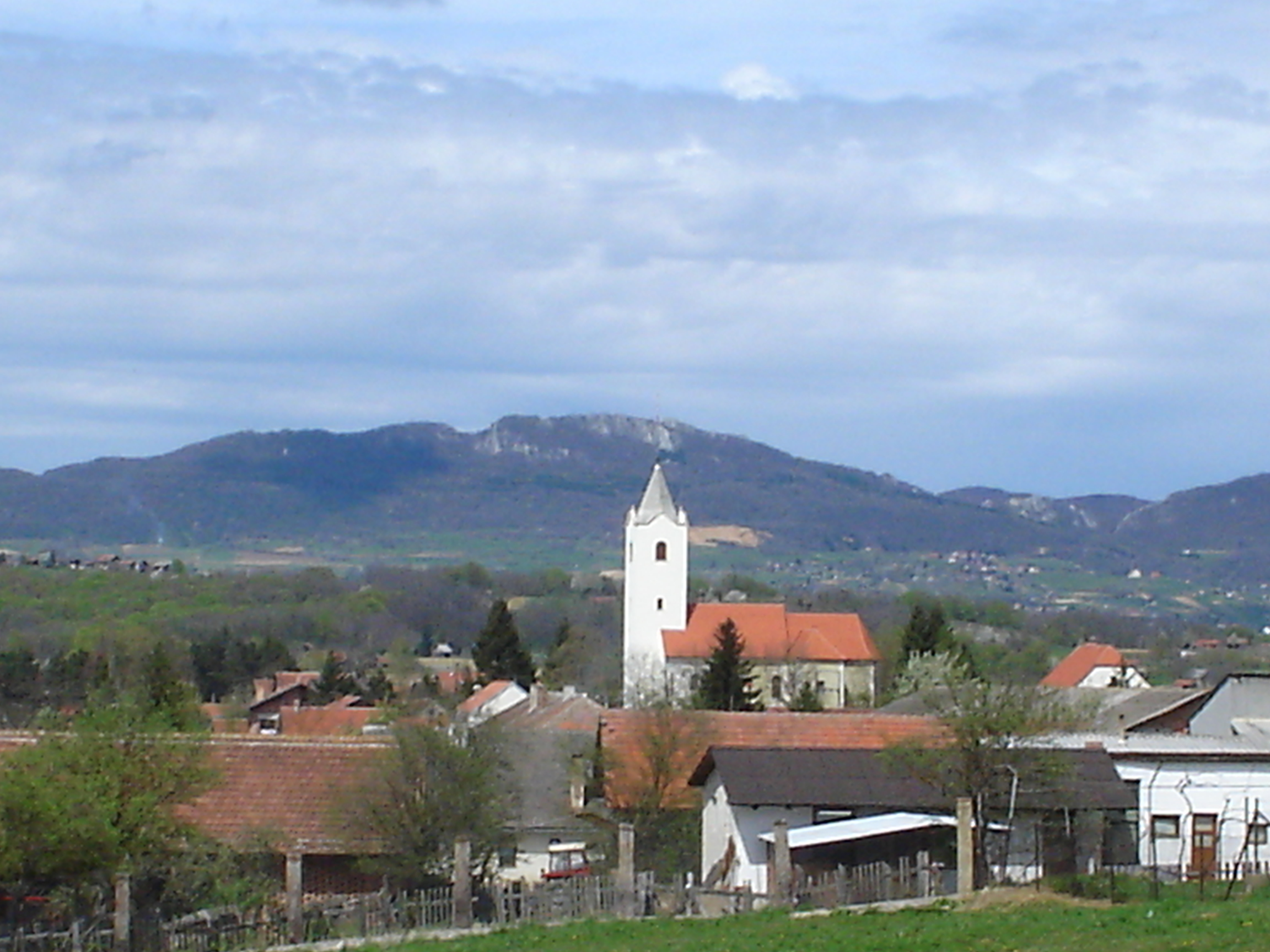
- Interactive map of Sveti Petar Orehovec
- Location within Croatia
- Coordinates: 46°05′N 16°27′E
- Country: Croatia
- County: Koprivnica-Križevci County

Government
  - Mayor: Franjo Poljak (HDZ)

Area
  - Total: 91.0 km^{2} (35.1 sq mi)

Population (2021)
  - Total: 3,942
  - Density: 43.3/km^{2} (112/sq mi)
- Time zone: UTC+1 (CET)
  - Summer (DST): UTC+2 (CEST)
- Postal code: 48260 Križevci
- Website: svetipetarorehovec.hr

Sveti Petar Orehovec is a settlement and a municipality in the Koprivnica-Križevci County in Croatia.

In the 2021 census, the municipality had 3,942 inhabitants.

The municipality was formed in 1993.

== History ==
In the late 19th century and early 20th century, Sveti Petar Orehovec was part of the Bjelovar-Križevci County of the Kingdom of Croatia-Slavonia. It was the seat of the Orehovečki noble family.

== Demographics ==
In 2021, the municipality had 3,942 residents in the following 37 settlements:

- Bočkovec, population 253
- Bogačevo, population 67
- Bogačevo Riječko, population 53
- Brdo Orehovečko, population 42
- Brezje Miholečko, population 136
- Brežani, population 16
- Črnčevec, population 134
- Dedina, population 193
- Donji Fodrovec, population 156
- Ferežani, population 83
- Finčevec, population 72
- Gorica Miholečka, population 48
- Gornji Fodrovec, population 157
- Gregurovec, population 203
- Guščerovec, population 160
- Hižanovec, population 73
- Hrgovec, population 26
- Kapela Ravenska, population 73
- Kusijevec, population 80
- Međa, population 143
- Miholec, population 322
- Mikovec, population 61
- Mokrice Miholečke, population 139
- Orehovec, population 83
- Piškovec, population 28
- Podvinje Miholečko, population 45
- Rovci, population 13
- Sela Ravenska, population 55
- Selanec, population 120
- Selnica Miholečka, population 64
- Sveti Petar Orehovec, population 226
- Šalamunovec, population 45
- Vinarec, population 158
- Voljavec Riječki, population 25
- Vukovec, population 75
- Zaistovec, population 229
- Zamladinec, population 86
Sveti Petar Orehovec: Population trends 1857–2021
v

population	4904	5625	6178	6730	7544	8402	8101	8342	8078	7938	7754	7224	6394	5684	5137	4583	3942
	1857	1869	1880	1890	1900	1910	1921	1931	1948	1953	1961	1971	1981	1991	2001	2011	2021

Sources: Croatian Bureau of Statistics publications

== Administration ==
The current mayor of Sveti Petar Orehovec is Franjo Poljak (HDZ) and the Sveti Petar Orehovec Municipal Council consists of 13 seats.

Groups	Councilors per group
HDZ	9 / 13
SDP	4 / 13
