= Rovci =

Rovci may refer to:

- Rovci or Rovčani, a Montenegrin tribe
- Rovci, Croatia, a village near Sveti Petar Orehovec
