= Križevci =

- Town
- Grad Križevci; Town of Križevci
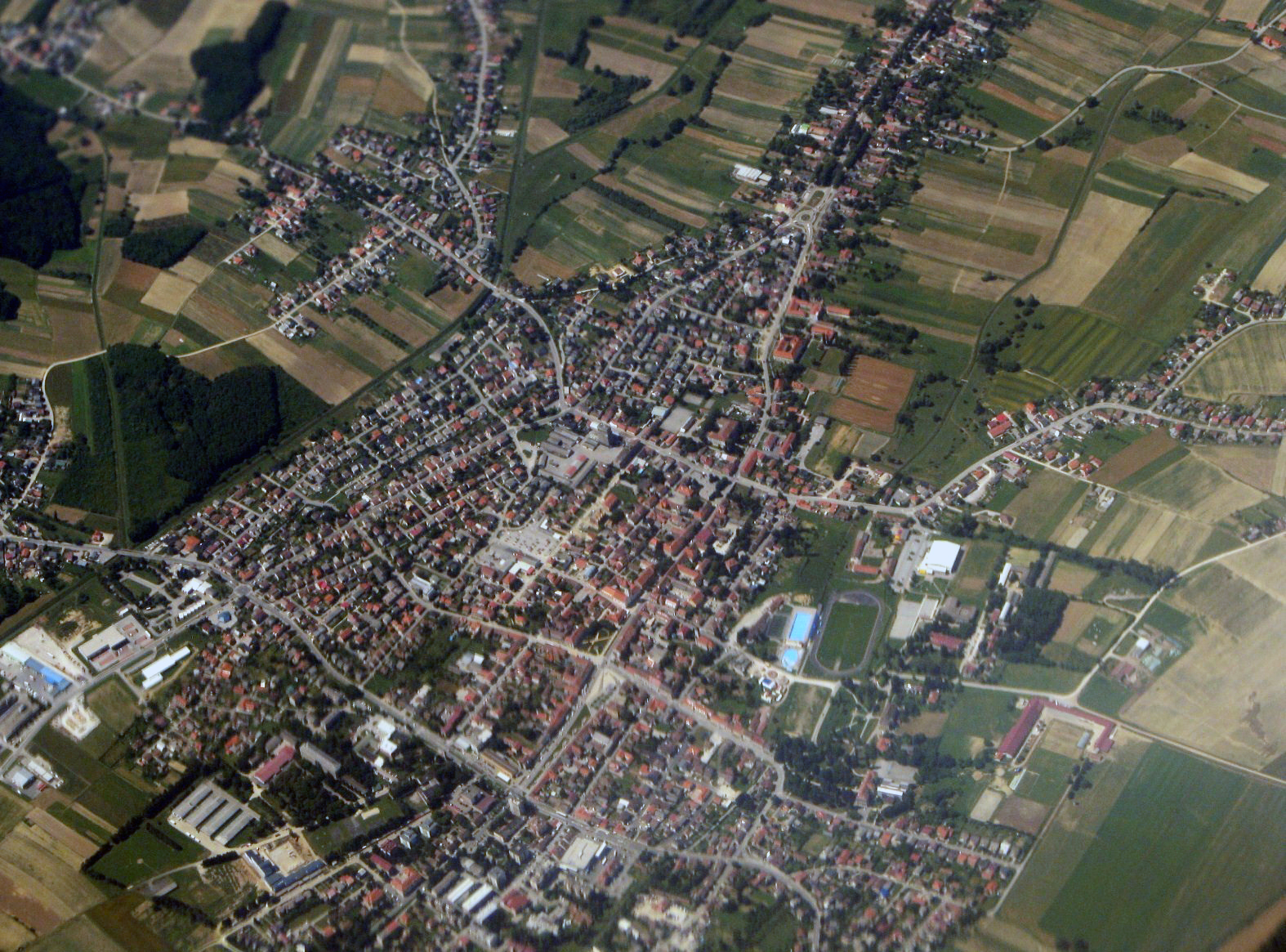
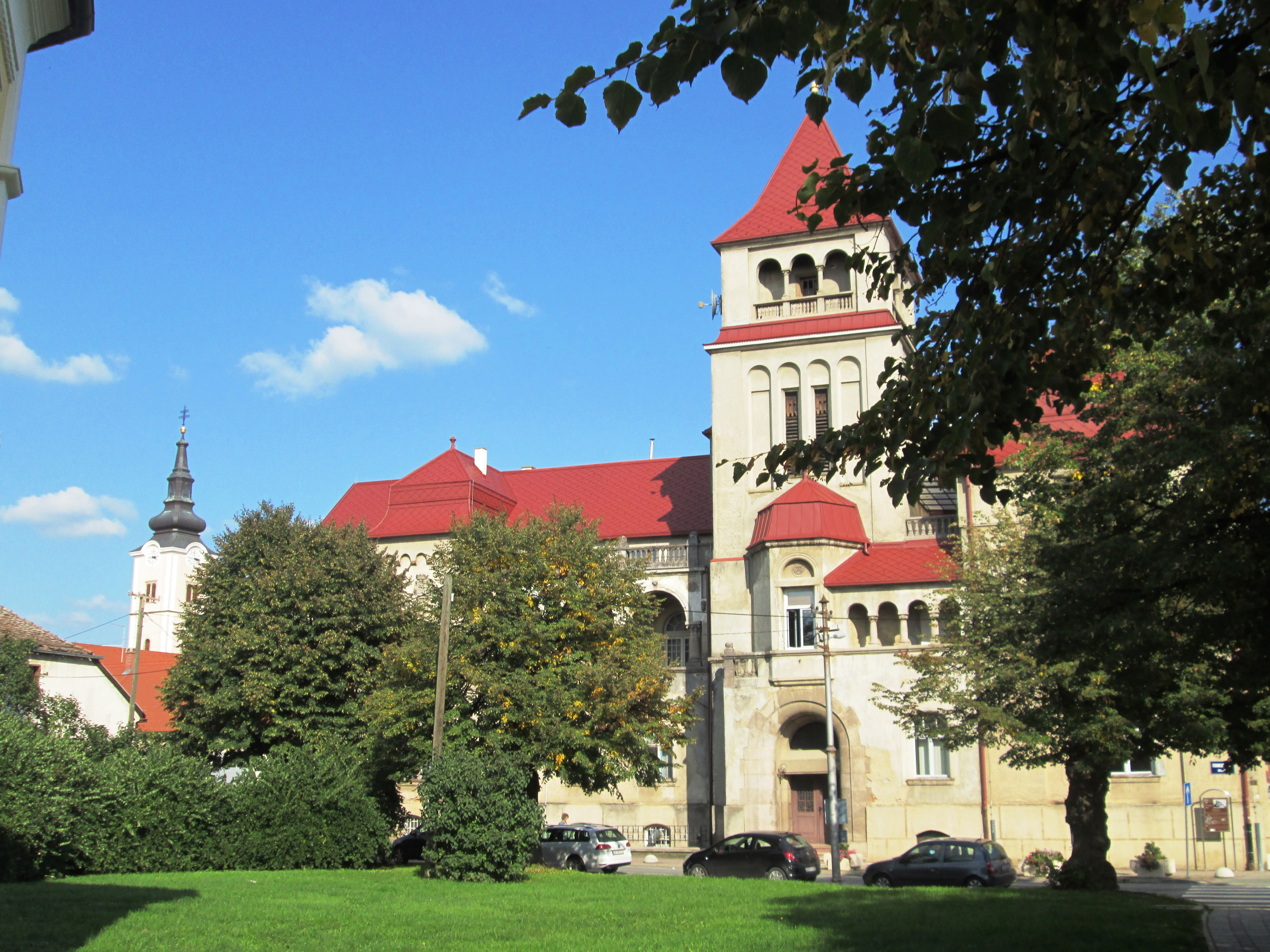
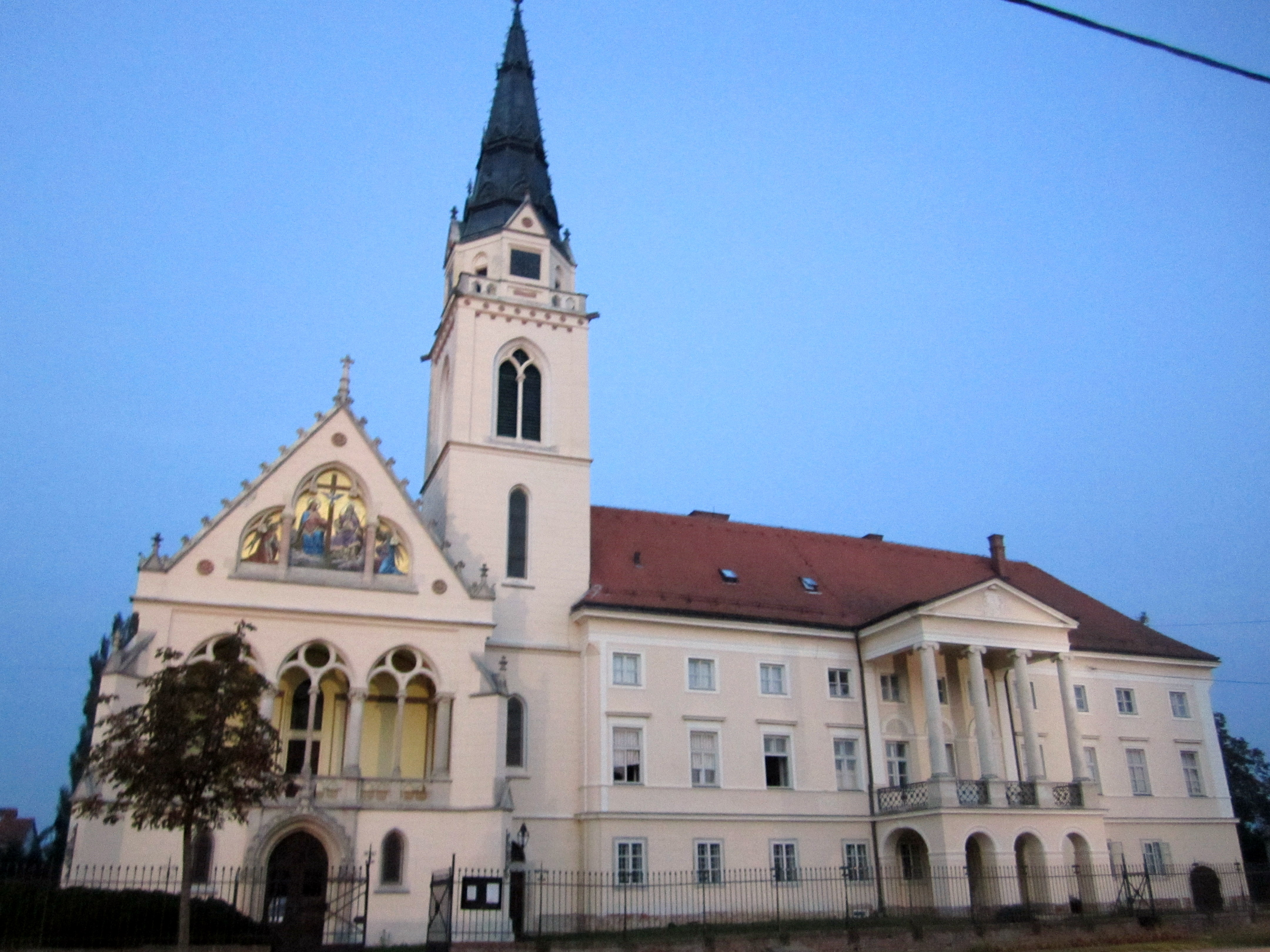
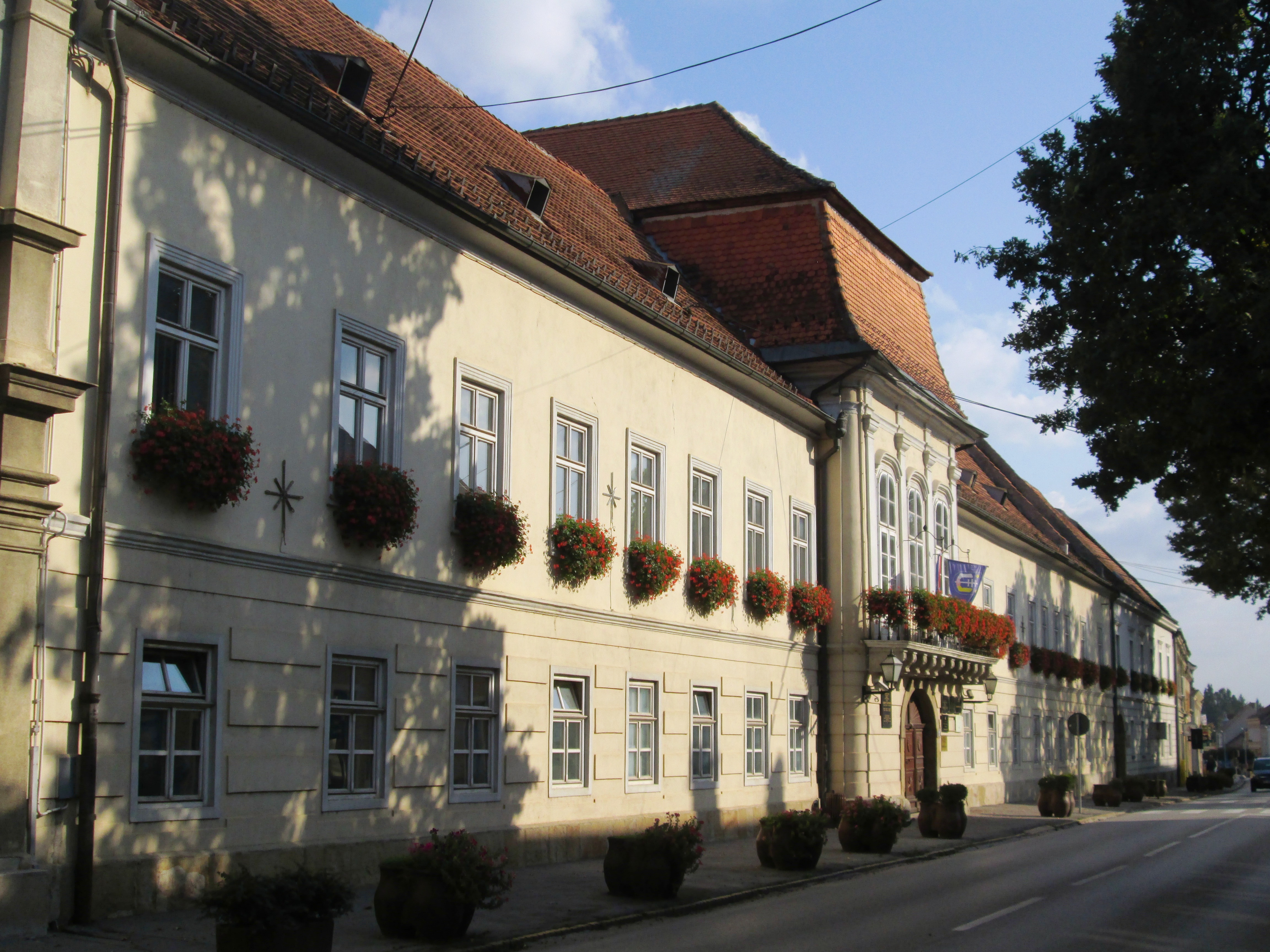
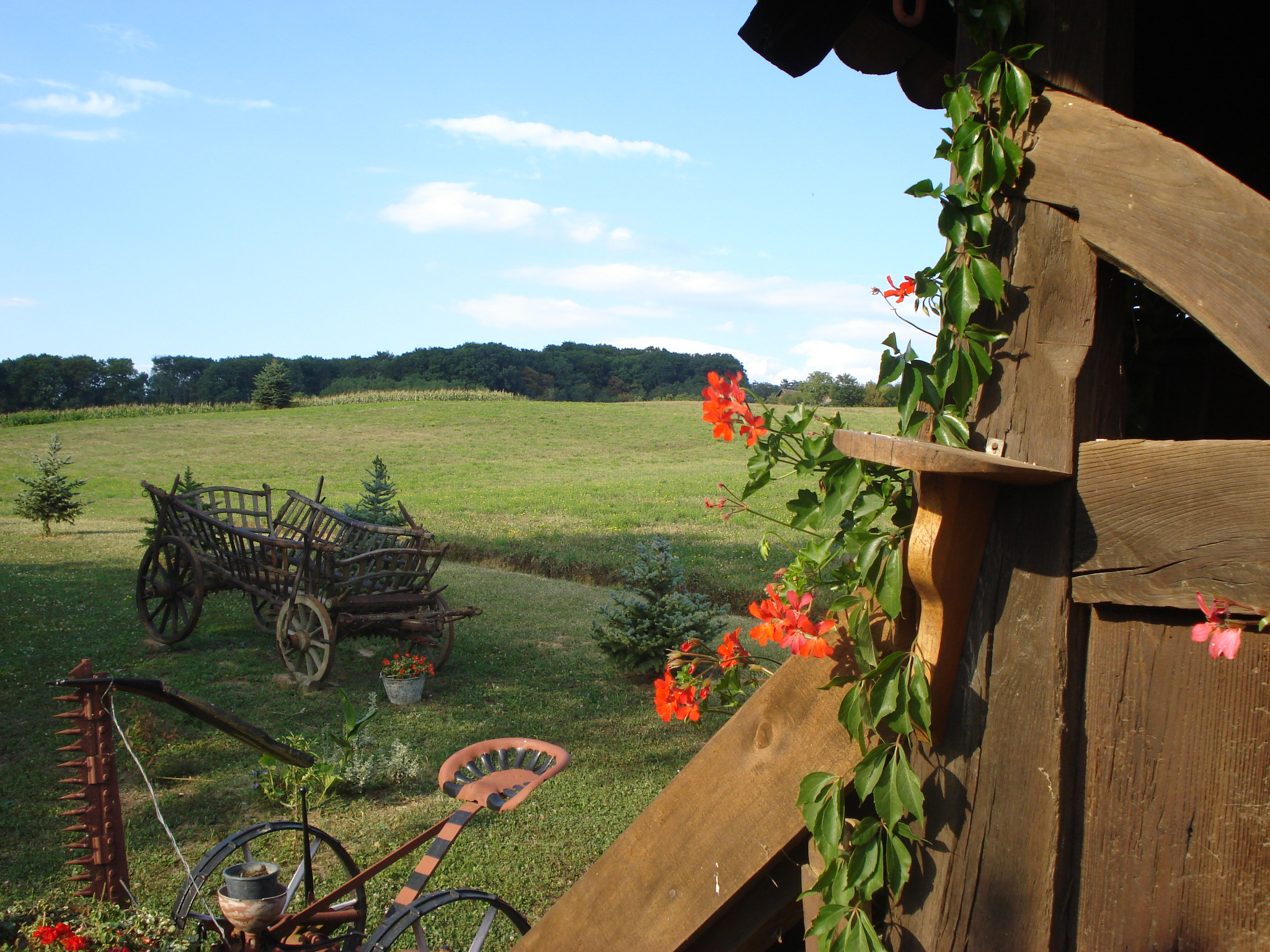
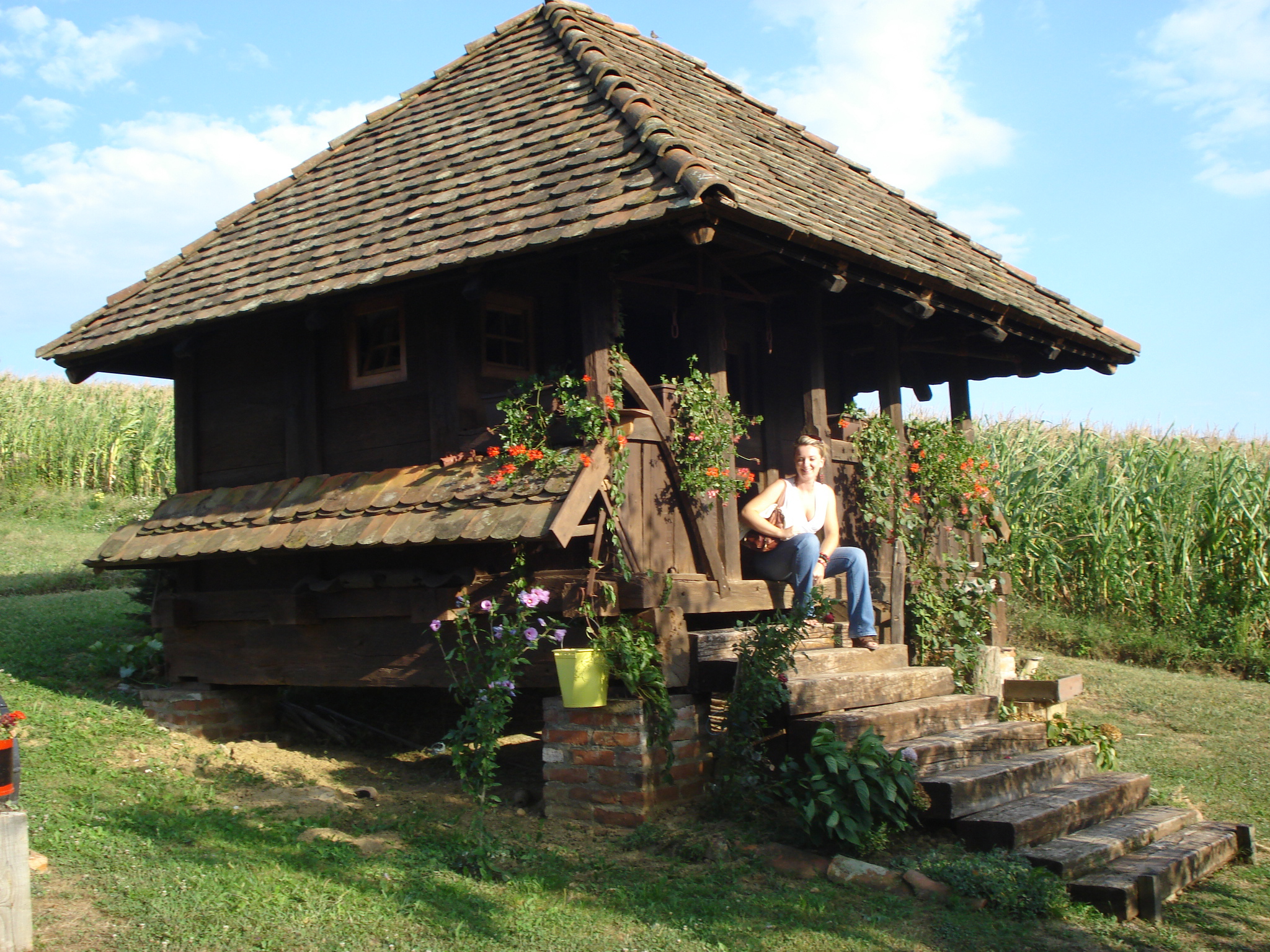
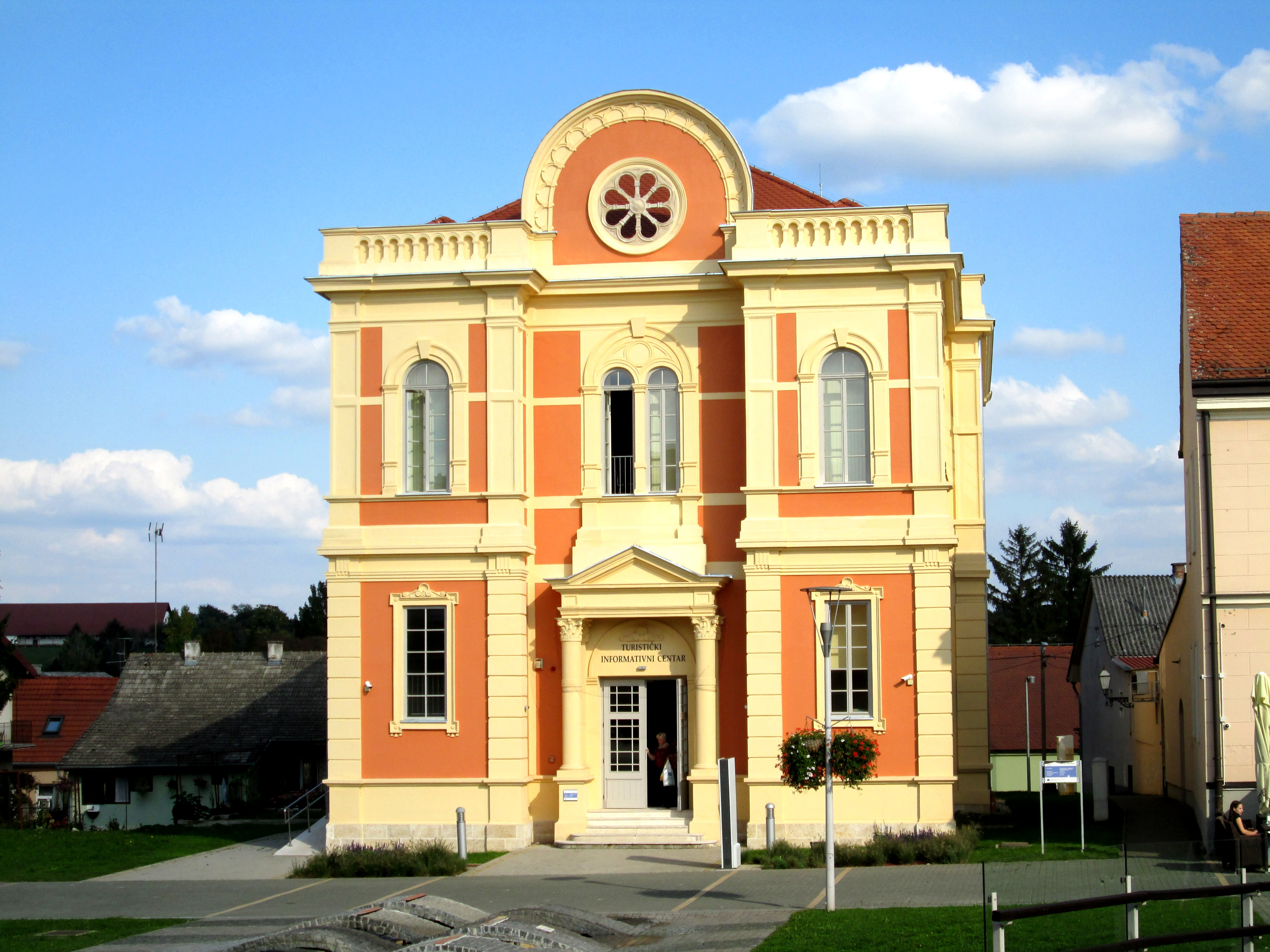
- Križevci
- Interactive map of Križevci
- Location within Croatia
- Coordinates: 46°01′33″N 16°32′33″E
- Country: Croatia
- Region: Central Croatia (Prigorje)
- County: Koprivnica-Križevci County

Government
  - Mayor: Tomislav Katanović (Ind.)

Area
  - Town: 264.2 km^{2} (102.0 sq mi)
  - Urban: 32.0 km^{2} (12.4 sq mi)
- Elevation: 140 m (460 ft)

Population (2021)
  - Town: 18,949
  - Density: 71.72/km^{2} (185.8/sq mi)
  - Urban: 10,522
  - Urban density: 329/km^{2} (852/sq mi)
- Time zone: UTC+1 (CET)
  - Summer (DST): UTC+2 (CEST)
- Postal code: 48260
- Area code: 048
- Vehicle registration: KŽ
- Website: krizevci.hr

Križevci (Croatian: [krǐːʒeːʋtsi]; Latin: Crisium; Hungarian: Kőrös [ˈkøːrøʃ]; German: Kreutz [kʁɔʏts]) is a town in northern Croatia with a total population of 18,949 and with 10,522 in the town itself, It is the oldest town in its county, the Koprivnica-Križevci County.

== History ==
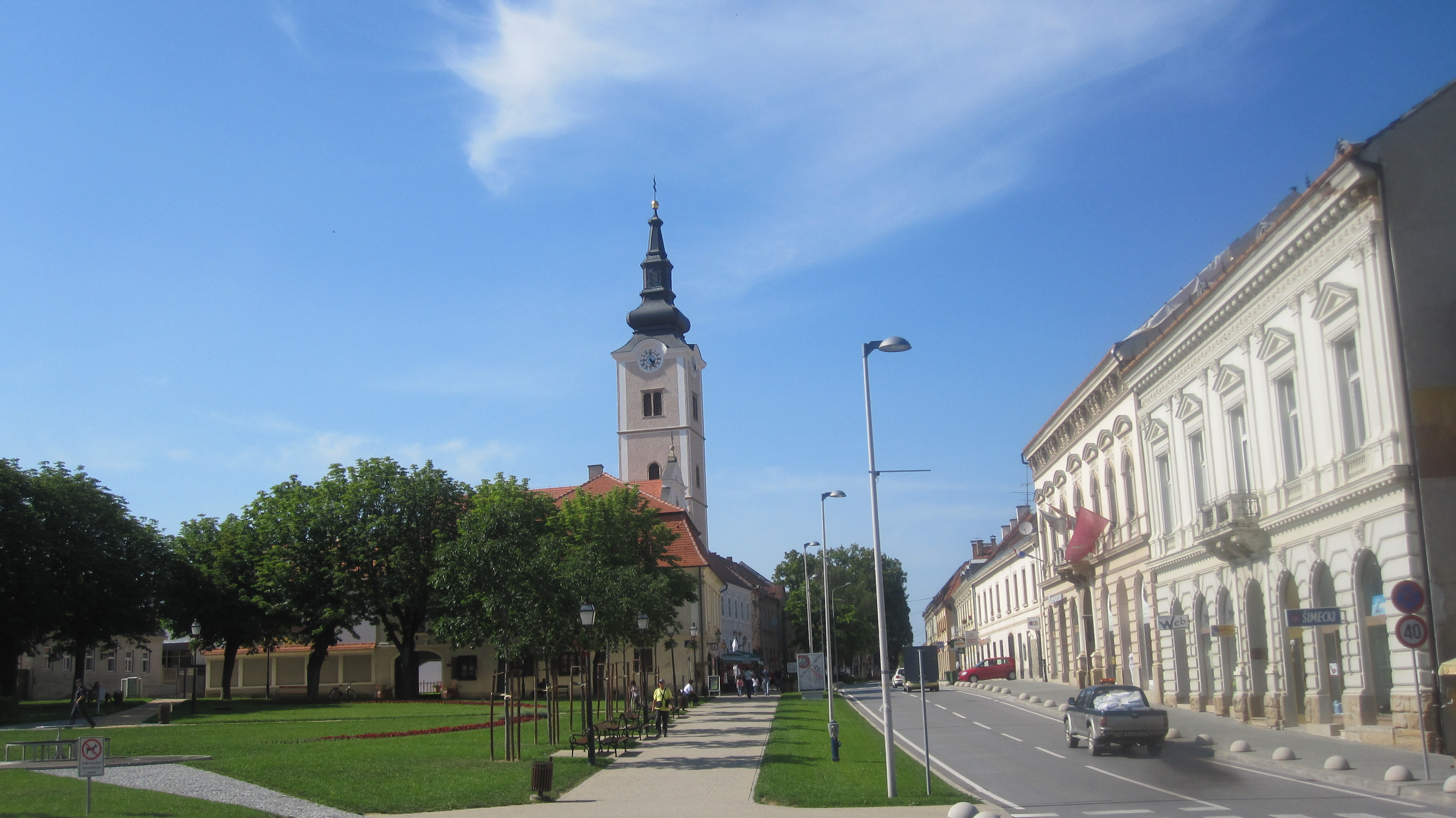
Saint Anne's Church

The first mention of "Upper Križevac" was in 1193 by Béla III, when it was given the status of a Royal Borough in 1252 by the ban (count) Stephan, and which was confirmed by King Béla IV a year later. "Lower Križevac" developed somewhat slower than its twin town: it became a free royal city in 1405, thanks to king Sigismund.

Bloody Sabor of Križevci (Croatian: Krvavi Sabor u Križevcima) refers to the assassination of the Croatian ban Stjepan Lacković and his followers at the orders of king Holy Roman Emperor Sigismund, on 27 February 1397.

Križevac is the birthplace of the Catholic priest and martyr Saint Marko of Križevac, who died at the hands of Calvinists in Košice in 1619, and was subsequently canonized because of his martyrdom. His feast day is celebrated on September 7.

After centuries of separation, Empress Maria Theresa of Austria united Lower and Upper Križevac into "Križevci" in 1752 (the word Križevci is plural of Križevac). The town was attacked during the wars with the Turks, but regained its prominence in 1871 when the newly built railway passed through it connecting Budapest and Rijeka.

In the late 19th century and early 20th century, Križevci was the district capital of the Bjelovar-Križevci County in the Kingdom of Croatia-Slavonia.

Presently, the city has become a center for entrepreneurship, and contains numerous ancient monuments within the town itself and the wider region

Križevci has nine churches (seven Roman Catholic, one Greek Catholic and one Serbian Orthodox), some of them dating back to the Middle Ages. In the oldest Gothic Church of Holy Cross in Križevci, there are important Baroque frescoes and a marble altar dating from the 18th century (by Francesco Robba). Also of artistic and cultural interest is the parish church of St. Anne from the 17th century.

Of particular note is the impressive and culturally significant Greek Catholic Cathedral of the Holy Trinity, the seat of the Eparchy of Križevci since 1789. The cathedral was designed by some of Zagreb's finest architects. Its facade was rebuilt by Bartol Felbinger in 1817; while an internal reconstruction was executed in the Gothic Revival style by Hermann Bolle in 1892-97. The iconostasis and the frescoes are the work of several important Croatian painters, including Ivan Tišov, Celestin Medović and Bela Čikoš-Sesija.

Križevci Synagogue was built in 1895. It was robbed and gutted by the fascist government in 1941, and turned into a cultural center by the communist government after the end of World War II. It was renovated in 2014 and now mainly serves as a Tourist Information Center.

The town museum exhibits a rich archeological, ethnographic and cultural-historical collection.

== Geography ==
Križevci is a town in the Koprivnica-Križevci County. Because of its close proximity to Zagreb (57 km), Križevci is becoming a "satellite suburb" of the national capital. It enjoys a central position in the region due to its close proximity to all the regional centers: Koprivnica (31 km), Bjelovar (33 km) and Varaždin (48 km). The town's importance has always depended on its status as a crossroads. It was known in antiquity and in the Middle Ages because of its location along one of the main caravan routes; in fact, there was a famous "King's Coloman Road" that passed through Križevci, connecting Pannonia and Dalmatia. In the more recent times it became a major transport hub: roads connecting Posavina and the region around Kalnik and Podravina were all already built in the 18th century; the railroad between Hungary and Zagreb, that goes through Koprivnica and Križevci (1870.), and to Bjelovar (1894). Today, the town remains an important center connecting Bjelovar and Koprivnica, and other major regional centers. Križevci is 140 m above sea-level, where the southern part of Kalnik begins.

Topographically, it lies on Pleistocene foundations, between swamped alluvial valleys of the brook Vrtlin from the east and the brook Koruska from the west. Relief, geological-petrografical structure, convenient climate and abundance of water, all contribute to the economic and demographic development of the town. The city has been affected by major demographic and economic regional changes, most notably due to increased industrialization and the consequent decline in agricultural production, and rural communities, with the population move to Križevci.

=== Climate ===
Since records began in 1961, the highest temperature recorded at the local weather station at an elevation of 157 metres (515 ft) was 38.5 °C (101.3 °F), on 6 August 2012. The coldest temperature was −25.5 °C (−13.9 °F), on 16 January 1963.

Climate data for Križevci, Croatia (1971–2000, extremes 1961–present)
| Month | Jan | Feb | Mar | Apr | May | Jun | Jul | Aug | Sep | Oct | Nov | Dec | Year |
|---|---|---|---|---|---|---|---|---|---|---|---|---|---|
| Record high °C (°F) | 18.4 (65.1) | 21.7 (71.1) | 25.2 (77.4) | 29.6 (85.3) | 32.7 (90.9) | 35.1 (95.2) | 37.6 (99.7) | 38.5 (101.3) | 33.5 (92.3) | 27.9 (82.2) | 23.9 (75.0) | 21.6 (70.9) | 38.5 (101.3) |
| Mean daily maximum °C (°F) | 2.9 (37.2) | 6.0 (42.8) | 11.2 (52.2) | 15.7 (60.3) | 20.8 (69.4) | 23.8 (74.8) | 25.9 (78.6) | 25.7 (78.3) | 21.5 (70.7) | 15.4 (59.7) | 8.3 (46.9) | 3.9 (39.0) | 15.1 (59.2) |
| Daily mean °C (°F) | −0.3 (31.5) | 1.7 (35.1) | 6.0 (42.8) | 10.2 (50.4) | 15.0 (59.0) | 18.1 (64.6) | 19.9 (67.8) | 19.2 (66.6) | 15.1 (59.2) | 9.8 (49.6) | 4.4 (39.9) | 0.8 (33.4) | 10.0 (50.0) |
| Mean daily minimum °C (°F) | −3.6 (25.5) | −2.5 (27.5) | 0.9 (33.6) | 4.5 (40.1) | 9.0 (48.2) | 12.3 (54.1) | 13.8 (56.8) | 13.4 (56.1) | 9.8 (49.6) | 5.2 (41.4) | 0.8 (33.4) | −2.3 (27.9) | 5.1 (41.2) |
| Record low °C (°F) | −25.5 (−13.9) | −22.6 (−8.7) | −18.7 (−1.7) | −5 (23) | −3 (27) | 0.5 (32.9) | 4.0 (39.2) | 2.4 (36.3) | −2.0 (28.4) | −7 (19) | −17.2 (1.0) | −21 (−6) | −25.5 (−13.9) |
| Average precipitation mm (inches) | 39.1 (1.54) | 40.1 (1.58) | 46.3 (1.82) | 57.5 (2.26) | 75.2 (2.96) | 90.4 (3.56) | 76.0 (2.99) | 70.5 (2.78) | 75.5 (2.97) | 75.5 (2.97) | 79.0 (3.11) | 60.9 (2.40) | 785.9 (30.94) |
| Average precipitation days (≥ 0.1 mm) | 9.0 | 8.6 | 9.9 | 12.2 | 12.2 | 13.3 | 10.6 | 9.8 | 10.4 | 11.0 | 11.2 | 10.6 | 128.9 |
| Average snowy days (≥ 1.0 cm) | 11.2 | 8.9 | 2.7 | 0.1 | 0.0 | 0.0 | 0.0 | 0.0 | 0.0 | 0.0 | 3.0 | 7.1 | 33.0 |
| Average relative humidity (%) | 84.7 | 78.4 | 72.0 | 69.6 | 71.9 | 73.5 | 73.8 | 76.7 | 81.3 | 83.9 | 85.8 | 87.0 | 78.2 |
| Mean monthly sunshine hours | 58.9 | 101.7 | 142.6 | 171.0 | 232.5 | 237.0 | 282.1 | 260.4 | 192.0 | 127.1 | 66.0 | 49.6 | 1,920.9 |
| Percentage possible sunshine | 24 | 39 | 43 | 46 | 54 | 55 | 64 | 64 | 56 | 44 | 30 | 25 | 48 |
Source: Croatian Meteorological and Hydrological Service

== Demographics ==
According to the 2021 census, Croats form an absolute majority at 97.21% with Serbs making up for 1.46% of the population.

The list of settlements in the administrative area of Križevci is:

- Apatovec, population 287
- Beketinec, population 31
- Bojnikovec, population 194
- Bukovje Križevačko, population 261
- Carevdar, population 350
- Cubinec, population 492
- Čabraji, population 126
- Dijankovec, population 140
- Doljanec, population 37
- Donja Brčkovčina, population 132
- Donja Glogovnica, population 93
- Donji Dubovec, population 30
- Đurđic, population 243
- Erdovec, population 191
- Gornja Brčkovčina, population 146
- Gornja Glogovnica, population 93
- Gornji Dubovec, population 7
- Gračina, population 177
- Ivanec Križevački, population 272
- Jarčani, population 89
- Karane, population 230
- Kloštar Vojakovački, population 318
- Kostadinovac, population 8
- Križevci, population 10,522
- Kučari, population 19
- Kunđevec, population 12
- Lemeš, population 86
- Lemeš Križevački, population 154
- Majurec, population 385
- Male Sesvete, population 35
- Mali Carevdar, population 15
- Mali Potočec, population 159
- Mali Raven, population 23
- Marinovec, population 82
- Mičijevac, population 54
- Novaki Ravenski, population 146
- Novi Bošnjani, population 62
- Novi Đurđic, population 131
- Osijek Vojakovački, population 141
- Pavlovec Ravenski, population 85
- Pesek, population 248
- Pobrđani Vojakovački, population 25
- Podgajec, population 184
- Poljana Križevačka, population 302
- Povelić, population 63
- Prikraj Križevački, population 181
- Ruševac, population 114
- Srednji Dubovec, population 80
- Stara Ves Ravenska, population 34
- Stari Bošnjani, population 82
- Sveta Helena, population 263
- Sveti Martin, population 86
- Špiranec, population 105
- Većeslavec, population 95
- Velike Sesvete, population 62
- Veliki Potočec, population 360
- Veliki Raven, population 234
- Vojakovac, population 207
- Vujići Vojakovački, population 54
- Žibrinovec, population 112
City of Križevci: Population trends 1857–2021
v

| population | 12438 | 12769 | 13752 | 15798 | 17709 | 19108 | 18319 | 19230 | 19729 | 20575 | 21793 | 22534 | 22772 | 22676 | 22324 | 21122 | 18949 |
| | 1857 | 1869 | 1880 | 1890 | 1900 | 1910 | 1921 | 1931 | 1948 | 1953 | 1961 | 1971 | 1981 | 1991 | 2001 | 2011 | 2021 |

Sources: Croatian Bureau of Statistics publications

== Administration ==
The current mayor of Križevci is Tomislav Katanović and the Križevci Town Council consists of 15 seats.

| Groups | Councilors per group |
| Independents | 12 / 15 |
| HDZ-HDS | 2 / 15 |
| SDP-HSS | 1 / 15 |

== Education ==
Križevci is home to the Križevci College of Agriculture, founded in 1860 as the Royal Agriculture and Forestry College.

== Culture ==
Križevci is home to a monument to the 37 people from the town who died in the Croatian War of Independence entitled the Mother of the Fallen Hero.

== Sports ==
The local chapter of the HPS is HPD "Kalnik", which had 56 members in 1936 under the Josip Heršak presidency. Membership rose to 69 in 1937. Membership rose to 97 in 1938.

== Notable people ==
- Dubravko Detoni - Composer
- Ivan Andrija Makar - 17th century Croatian and Habsburg soldier
- Julije Drohobeczky - Bishop
- Sidonija Rubido - First Croatian opera singer
- Branko Hrg - Politician
- Dora Kalaus - Handball player
- Larissa Kalaus
- Marcel Kiepach - Inventor
- Marko Krizin - Catholic Saint
- Franjo Marković - Writer
- Antun Nemčić - Writer
- Dragutin Novak
- Vanessa Radman
- Alfred Švarc
- Marko Tomas - Basketball player
- Ljudevit Vukotinović
- Branko Zorko
- Drago Grdenić
- Antonio Radić (born 1987), known for his YouTube chess channel 'agadmator'.
- Magda Logomer, Herbalist

== See also ==
- Roman Catholic Diocese of Bjelovar-Križevci
- Eparchy of Križevci
