= Dubravko Detoni =

Dubravko Detoni (born 22 February 1937) is a composer, pianist and writer. Although active since the early 1970s, he is almost unknown internationally.

He was born in Križevci, Croatia, educated in Zagreb, Sienna, Warsaw and Darmstadt, and studied with John Cage in Paris. He has written more than a hundred musical pieces, theatrical spectacles, multimedia and performance pieces, books of poetry, essays, commentaries, and radio and TV programs.

His son Danijel is a pianist.

As the founder and leader of the ensemble Acezantez, he has performed around Europe, Asia and North America.

In 2000, the Paradigm Discs record label released Dubravko Detoni a CD of pieces from 3 LPs that appeared on Jugoton (today's Croatia Records) in the mid 1970s.
