= Mali Raven =

Coordinates: 45°59′N 16°29′E

- Village
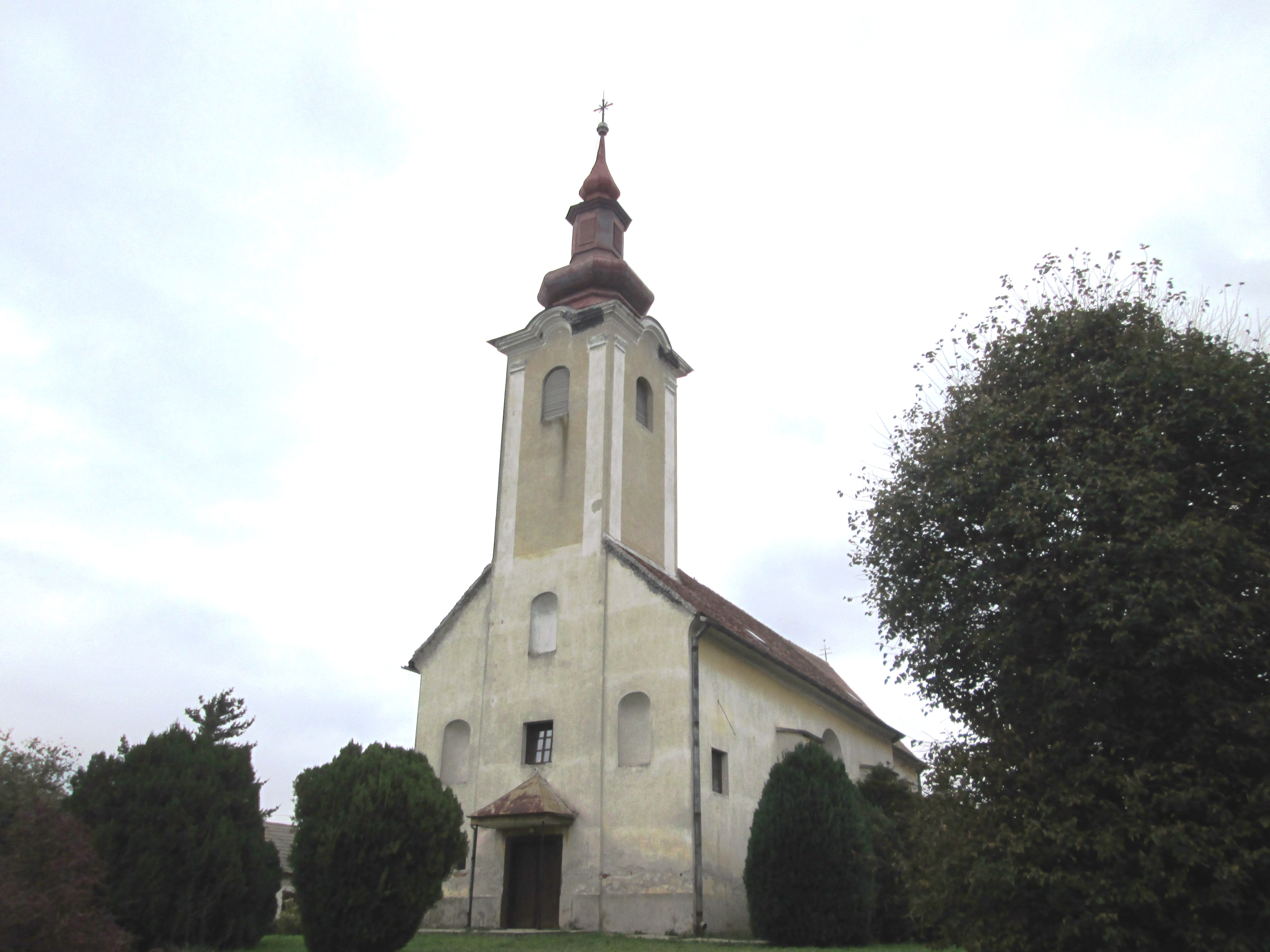
- Church in Mali Raven, Croatia.
- Interactive map of Mali Raven
- Country: Croatia
- County: Koprivnica-Križevci
- Municipality: Križevci

Area
  - Total: 1.7 km^{2} (0.66 sq mi)

Population (2021)
  - Total: 23
  - Density: 14/km^{2} (35/sq mi)
- Time zone: UTC+1 (CET)
  - Summer (DST): UTC+2 (CEST)

Mali Raven is a village in Croatia. It is connected by the D41 highway.
