= Blinja =

- Village
- Location of Blinja in Croatia
- Coordinates: 45°21′25″N 16°22′19″E
- Country: Croatia
- Region: Continental Croatia (Banovina)
- County: Sisak-Moslavina
- Municipality: Petrinja

Area
  - Total: 1.5 sq mi (3.8 km^{2})

Population (2021)
  - Total: 58
  - Density: 40/sq mi (15/km^{2})
- Time zone: UTC+1 (CET)
  - Summer (DST): UTC+2 (CEST)
- Postal number: 44211
- Area code: (+385) 44

Blinja is a village in central Croatia, in the Town of Petrinja, Sisak-Moslavina County. It is connected by the D30 highway.

== History ==
Petar Keglević obtained the medieval fortification in Blinja in the 16th century. In 1559 Ivan Lenković proposed destruction of the fortress so that it would not fall into Ottoman hands. In a report written by the commissioner of the Holy Roman Emperor Ferdinand I, the fortress is described as the last one before the Ottoman-controlled lands, and that its walls were damaged and surrounded by water. During the wider Siege of Gvozdansko offensive in 1578, the fortress was under siege and damaged but was not conquered by the Ottomans. The fortress remained unconquered until the Ottoman retreat after the end of the Great Turkish War and the signing of the Treaty of Karlowitz. Since that time the fortification has been unused and has deteriorated over the years. The modern day ruins of the fortification are located in the forest-covered hill south-east of the village.

== Demographics ==
According to the 2011 census, the village of Blinja had 78 inhabitants. This represents 37.14% of its pre-war population according to the 1991 census.

Population change 1857–2011
v

population	305	363	366	454	476	510	499	477	366	354	352	313	262	210	74	78
	1857	1869	1880	1890	1900	1910	1921	1931	1948	1953	1961	1971	1981	1991	2001	2011

Sources: Croatian Bureau of Statistics publications

== Religion ==
=== Serbian Orthodox Church of Saint Elijah ===
The Serbian Orthodox Church of Saint Elijah in Blinja was constructed in 1809 on the site of the earlier wooden church from 1780. The local Orthodox parish was established in 1777 while its public records books have been kept since 1770. The architectural style selected for the new church was a combination of neoclassicism and baroque. Permission for construction of the church was issued by the Zagreb General Command of the Military Frontier and it is therefore believed that the project itself was designed by some of Zagreb's architects.
