= Bukovje Križevačko =

Coordinates: 45°59′N 16°34′E

- Village
- Interactive map of Bukovje Križevačko
- Country: Croatia
- County: Koprivnica-Križevci
- Municipality: Križevci

Area
  - Total: 2.3 km^{2} (0.89 sq mi)

Population (2021)
  - Total: 261
  - Density: 110/km^{2} (290/sq mi)
- Time zone: UTC+1 (CET)
  - Summer (DST): UTC+2 (CEST)

Bukovje Križevačko is a village in Croatia. It is connected by the D22 highway.
