= Veliki Raven =

Coordinates: 45°59′N 16°29′E

- Village
- Interactive map of Veliki Raven
- Country: Croatia
- County: Koprivnica-Križevci
- Town: Križevci

Area
  - Total: 6.0 km^{2} (2.3 sq mi)

Population (2021)
  - Total: 234
  - Density: 39/km^{2} (100/sq mi)
- Time zone: UTC+1 (CET)
  - Summer (DST): UTC+2 (CEST)

Veliki Raven is a village in Croatia. It is connected by the D41 highway.
