= Bojnikovec =

Coordinates: 46°00′50″N 16°26′15″E

- Village
- Interactive map of Bojnikovec
- Country: Croatia
- County: Koprivnica-Križevci
- Town: Križevci

Area
  - Total: 3.0 km^{2} (1.2 sq mi)

Population (2021)
  - Total: 194
  - Density: 65/km^{2} (170/sq mi)
- Time zone: UTC+1 (CET)
  - Summer (DST): UTC+2 (CEST)

Bojnikovec is a village in Croatia. It is connected by the D41 highway.
