= Marcel Kiepach =

Croatian inventor

Marcel Kiepach (12 February 1894 – 12 August 1915) was an inventor who was a subject of the Austro-Hungarian Empire of Croatian ethnicity. The works and inventions of this child prodigy belong to the areas of electronics, magnetism, acoustics, transmission of sound signals, and transformers.

Marcel was born in Križevci as a descendant of the noble family Kiepach, which came to Križevci in the early 19th century and became influential in the town. He studied economics in Berlin and electrical engineering in Charlottenburg.

In Berlin on 16 March 1910, as a boy of sixteen, Marcel patented a maritime compass that indicates north regardless of the presence of iron or magnetic forces. He patented an improved version in London on 20 December 1911. This second version was a remote maritime compass device, consisting of ammeters as the indicating instruments located in different parts of the ship, resistant to magnetic forces or magnetic masses in their vicinity.

In France, he patented a dynamo for vehicle lighting. It was an electric generator combined with the mechanical drive of the vehicle itself. His "small transformer" for low voltage was widely implemented according to the "Kiepach-Weiland System". He also patented a power switch. He was active in various other areas of mechanics and electronics. He held correspondence with famous world scientists and inventors.

When World War I broke out, Kiepach volunteered. He died at the Russian front when he was 21. His remains were brought to Križevci in 1917, where they were laid in the family tomb in the Town Cemetery.

His two patents were included in the big exhibition Centuries of Natural Science in Croatia: Theory and Application (June–October 1996, Klovićevi Dvori Gallery). Prof. Vladimir Muljević lectured about his work at the 4th international symposium on new technologies 1993. Today, Križevci have the Marcel Kiepach Innovation Society. The town museum keeps many of his documents and family photographs. In 2004, Križevci held an exhibition about the Kiepach family.
