= Sudovec =

Coordinates: 46°06′07″N 16°21′32″E

- Village
- Interactive map of Sudovec
- Country: Croatia
- County: Međimurje County
- City: Novi Marof

Area
  - Total: 10.1 km^{2} (3.9 sq mi)

Population (2021)
  - Total: 304
  - Density: 30.1/km^{2} (78.0/sq mi)
- Time zone: UTC+1 (CET)
  - Summer (DST): UTC+2 (CEST)

Sudovec is a village near Novi Marof in northern Croatia. It is connected by the D22 highway.
