= Dropkovec =

Coordinates: 46°06′10″N 16°24′45″E

- Village
- Interactive map of Dropkovec
- Country: Croatia
- County: Koprivnica-Križevci County

Area
  - Total: 2.1 km^{2} (0.81 sq mi)

Population (2021)
  - Total: 150
  - Density: 71/km^{2} (180/sq mi)
- Time zone: UTC+1 (CET)
  - Summer (DST): UTC+2 (CEST)

Dropkovec is a village in Croatia. It is connected by the D22 highway.
