= Finčevec =

Coordinates: 46°06′01″N 16°25′37″E

- Village
- Interactive map of Finčevec
- Country: Croatia
- County: Koprivnica-Križevci County
- Municipality: Sveti Petar Orehovec

Area
  - Total: 1.6 km^{2} (0.62 sq mi)

Population (2021)
  - Total: 72
  - Density: 45/km^{2} (120/sq mi)
- Time zone: UTC+1 (CET)
  - Summer (DST): UTC+2 (CEST)

Finčevec is a village in Croatia. It is connected by the D22 highway.
