= House of Orehovečki =

Orehovečki (Orehóczy)
- Croatian noble family
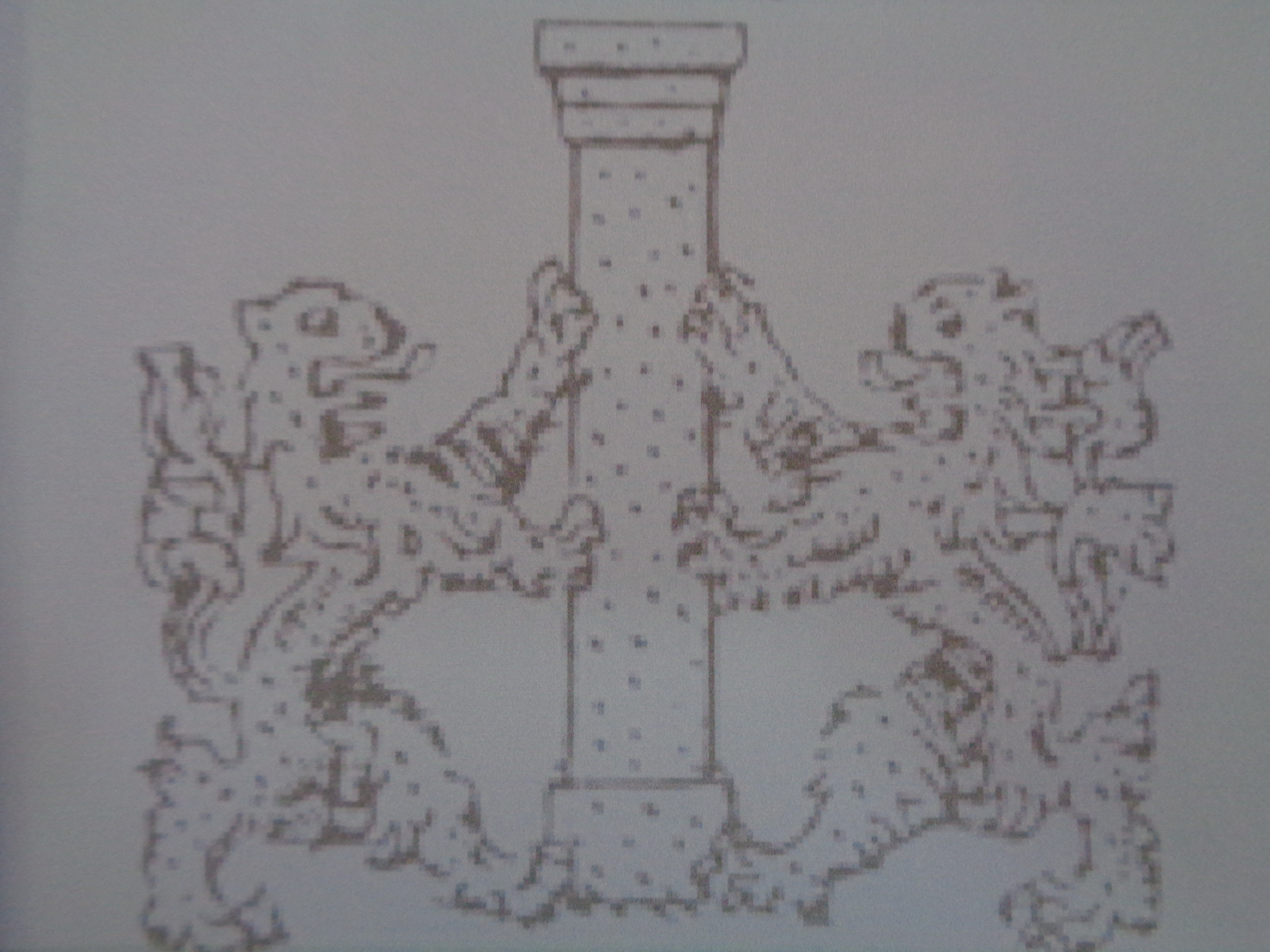
- Family coat of arms
- Country: Kingdom of Croatia in personal union with Hungary, Kingdom of Croatia in Habsburg Monarchy
- Founded: 13th century
- Founder: Pavao (Paul) Orehovečki
- Current head: extinct
- Final ruler: Count Stanislav Orehovečki
- Titles: baron, count (since 1690)
- Estates: Sveti Petar Orehovec, Guščerovec, Psarjevo, Trem, Tosovec
- Dissolution: 1727 (as counts)

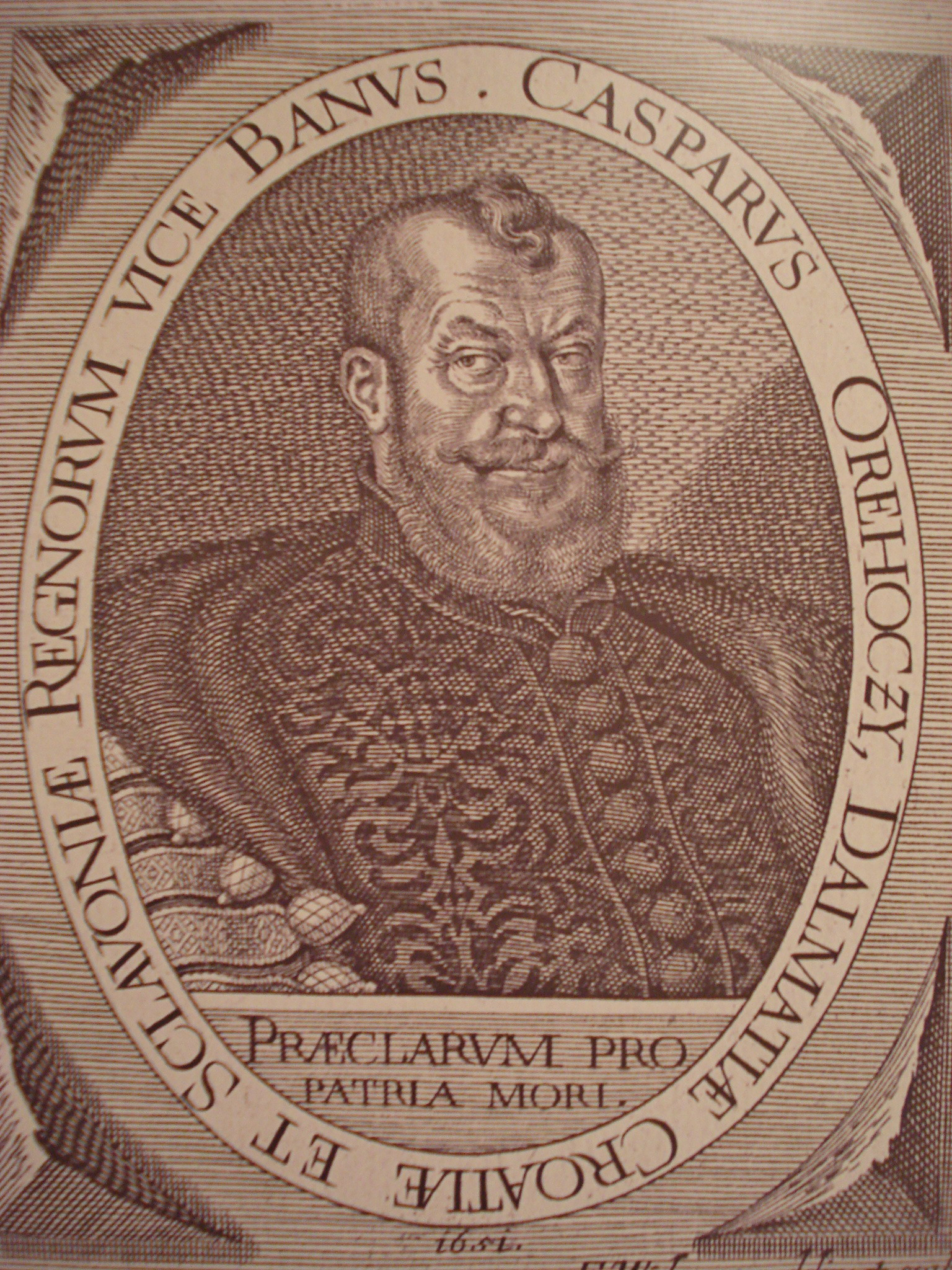
Gašpar Orehovečki (c. 1600 – 1672), Vice-Ban of Croatia (1647–1670)

The House of Orehovečki (Croatian pronunciation: [ɔrehɔˈʋetʃki], Hungarian: Orehóczy) was a Croatian noble family, descending from Sveti Petar Orehovec in the former Bjelovar-Križevci County, where it had its largest estates, and reached its peak in the 17th century. Thanks to the marriage connections, it was connected to many influential noble families like Keglević, Patačić, Ratkaj, Alapić etc. Notable members of the family were important state officials (like Vice-Ban of Croatia, and župan - head of the county), military officers, Catholic Church prelates and so on.

== Family history ==
The first family members were mentioned in the 13th century. Pavao/Paul Orehovečki lived around the year 1300, his son Juraj/George was mentioned in 1334, and his grandson Martin was born around 1320 (died after 1375). Over the next centuries the family acquired real estates in Guščerovec, Psarjevo, Trem and Tosovec, according to which the family branches were formed. The most powerful and distinguished branch was the Guščerovec one, whose members can be seen in the family tree: Gašpar/Casper, founder of the branch (who lived between 1512–1560/1562), his son Franjo/Francis (~1552–1614/1615), grandson Gašpar/Casper (~1600–1672), great-grandson Stjepan/Stephen (~1640–1703) and finally great-great-grandson Stanislav/Stanislaus (~1681–1727).

Gašpar Orehovečki (~1600–1672) had a title of baron and served as Vice-Ban of Croatia (1647-1670), the deputy of Nikola Zrinski. When Zrinski was killed while hunting on November 18, 1664 at Kuršanec in northern Croatia, Gašpar continued to serve as the deputy of Petar Zrinski, Nikola's younger brother. His son Stjepan was given the title of count in 1690 by the king Leopold I of Habsburg. The last member of the Guščerovec noble family branch, Stjepan's son Stanislav, died in 1727, having no children.

During the following centuries, total number of family members of all branches slowly increased: at the beginning of the 17th century there were 48 of them and at the beginning of the 19th century already 68. In the recent times their number has been more than a hundred. In the past, Orehovečkis possessed a significant number of castles and manor houses in Croatia. The most notable of them were Stari grad Veliki Kalnik, Stari grad Mali Kalnik and Gornja rijeka.

== Castles and manor houses ==
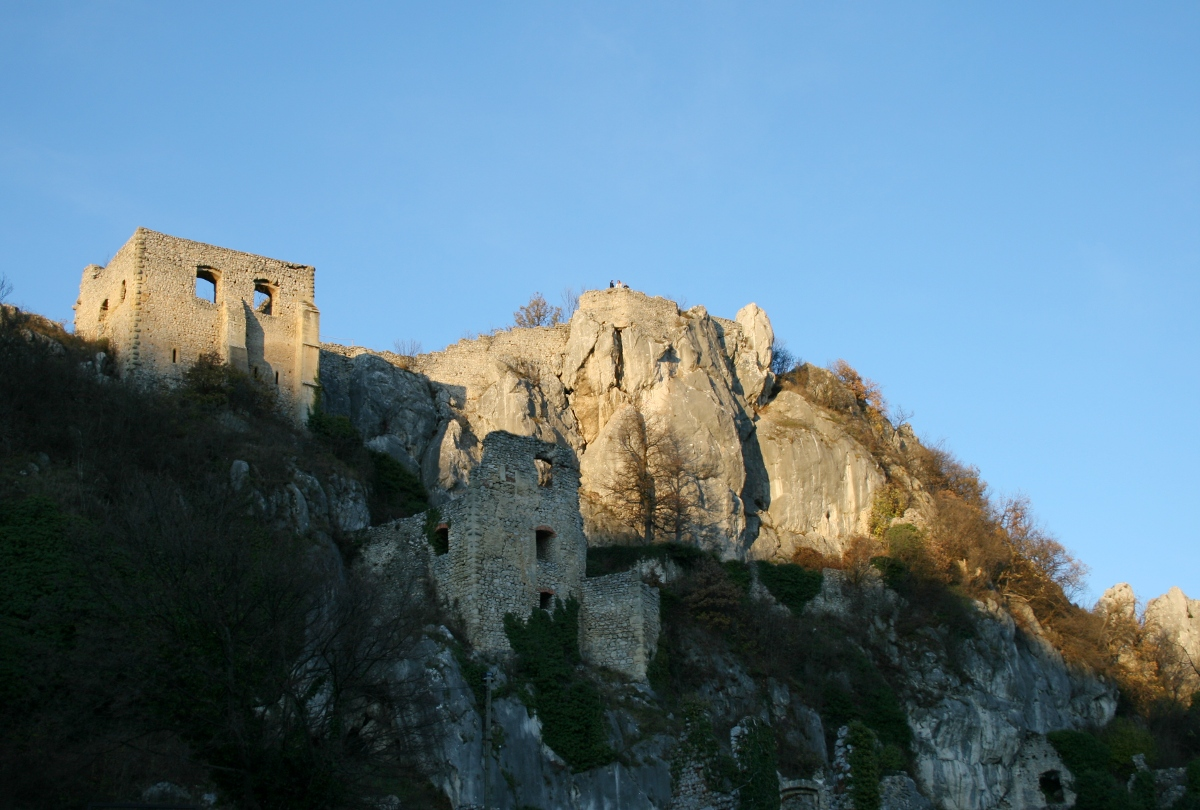
Stari grad Veliki Kalnik

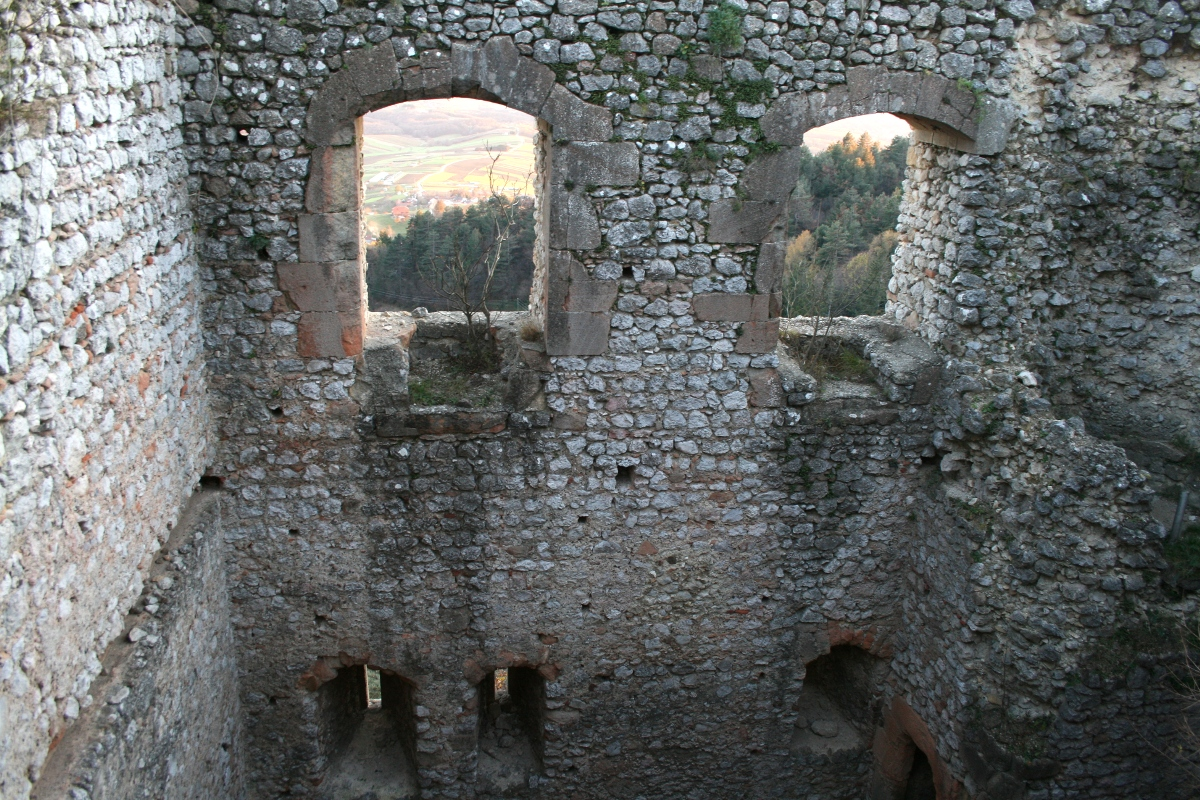
Stari grad Mali Kalnik

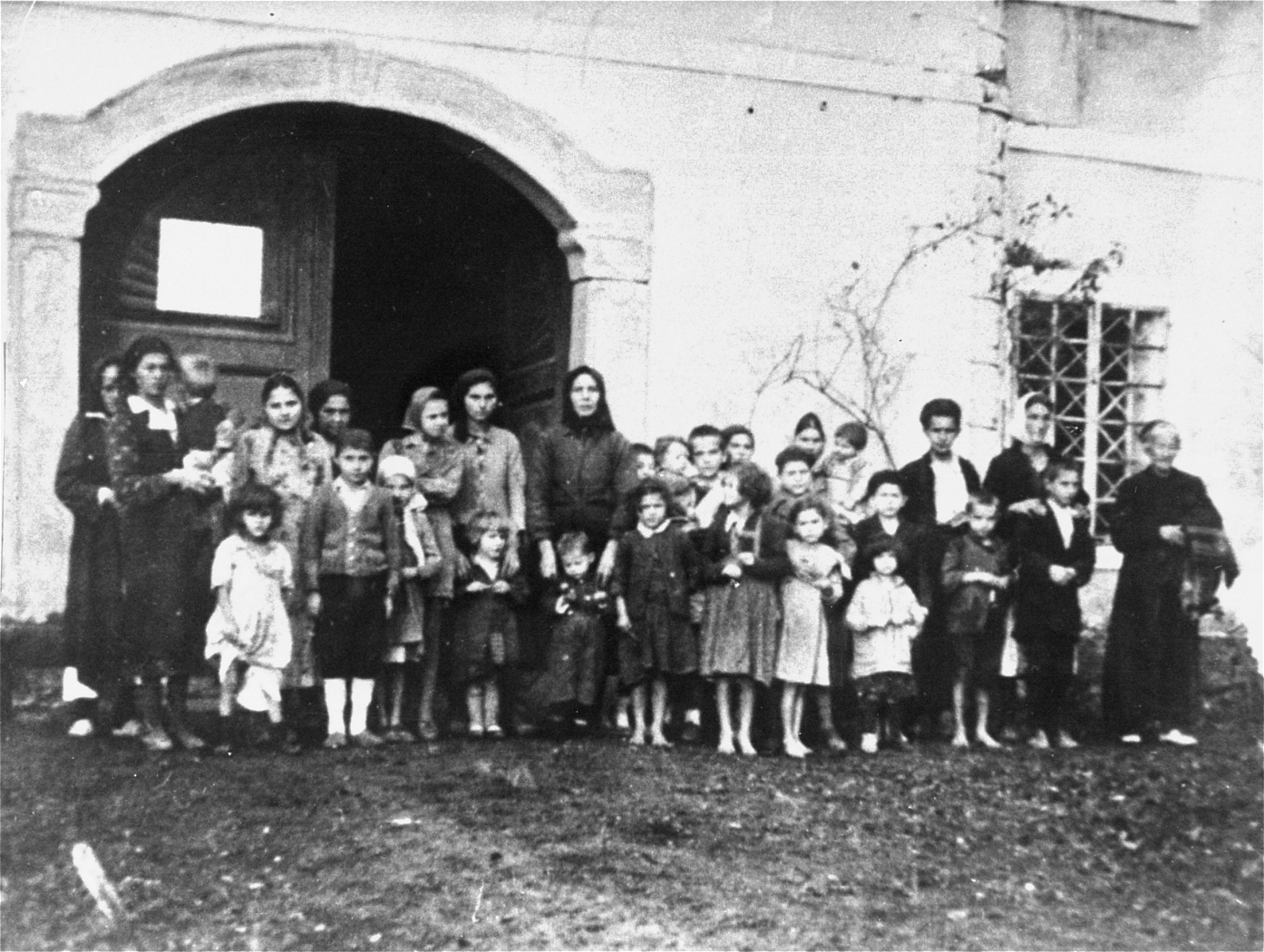
Dvorac Gornja Rijeka

== See also ==
- Bans of Croatia
- List of noble families of Croatia
- Croatia in personal union with Hungary
- History of Croatia
- List of castles in Croatia
