= Bočkovec =

Coordinates: 46°05′03″N 16°29′46″E

- Village
- Interactive map of Bočkovec
- Country: Croatia
- County: Koprivnica-Križevci County
- Municipality: Sveti Petar Orehovec

Area
  - Total: 3.4 km^{2} (1.3 sq mi)

Population (2021)
  - Total: 253
  - Density: 74/km^{2} (190/sq mi)
- Time zone: UTC+1 (CET)
  - Summer (DST): UTC+2 (CEST)

Bočkovec is a village in Croatia.
