= Selanec =

Coordinates: 46°04′45″N 16°28′39″E

- Village
- Interactive map of Selanec
- Country: Croatia
- County: Koprivnica-Križevci County
- Municipality: Sveti Petar Orehovec

Area
  - Total: 1.3 km^{2} (0.50 sq mi)

Population (2021)
  - Total: 120
  - Density: 92/km^{2} (240/sq mi)
- Time zone: UTC+1 (CET)
  - Summer (DST): UTC+2 (CEST)

Selanec is a village in Croatia.
