= Cubinec =

Coordinates: 45°59′N 16°34′E

- Village
- Interactive map of Cubinec
- Country: Croatia
- County: Koprivnica-Križevci County

Area
  - Total: 1.1 sq mi (2.8 km^{2})

Population (2021)
  - Total: 492
  - Density: 460/sq mi (180/km^{2})
- Time zone: UTC+1 (CET)
  - Summer (DST): UTC+2 (CEST)

Cubinec is a village in Croatia. It is connected by the D22 highway.
