= Božo Švarc =

Božo Švarc (Schwarz) (6 September 1920 – 4 May 2007) was a Yugoslav - Jewish athlete, political activist, and WW2 veteran.

Švarc is one of a very few survivors of notorious Jadovno concentration camp and one of the founding fathers of Partizan Belgrade.

== Biography ==
Božo Švarc was born in 1920 in Zagreb, Croatia. Before the start of World War II, he was a student of Technical Faculty and member of the youth branch of Communist Party of Yugoslavia, since 1939.

During the 1930s Švarc was an active member of the Maccabi World Union sports club (skiing and high-jump).

Švarc was among 165 Jewish youths arrested by Ustasha nazi collaborators in May 1941. He escaped execution from Jadovno concentration camp in the Lika region. In August 1941 Švarc was deported to Jasenovac concentration camp. Together with his friend and fellow Macabee Pavel Lev, Švarc escaped Jasenovac and joined the partisans in Banija region in September 1942.

After WW2, Švarc was among founders of Partizan Belgrade football club, and long-standing president of Partizan ice-hockey and Partizan swimming club.

Švarc also served as the Chairman of the archive of Military History Institute in Belgrade. He retired in 1980 in the rank of the JNA colonel.

Švarc died in Belgrade in May 2007.
