= Vukovec =

Coordinates: 46°06′N 16°25′E

- Village
- Interactive map of Vukovec
- Country: Croatia

Area
  - Total: 0.8 km^{2} (0.31 sq mi)

Population (2021)
  - Total: 75
  - Density: 94/km^{2} (240/sq mi)
- Time zone: UTC+1 (CET)
  - Summer (DST): UTC+2 (CEST)

Vukovec is a village in Croatia. It is connected by the D22 highway.
