= Branko Švarc =

Croatian communist and Mayor of Koprivnica (1894–1972)

- Born: 1894; Koprivnica, Austro-Hungarian Empire, (now Croatia)
- Died: 1972 (aged 78); Koprivnica, SFR Yugoslavia
- Resting place: Koprivnica cemetery
- Occupation: Politician
- Years active: 1932–1937 (Mayor)
- Known for: Mayor of Koprivnica
- Spouse: Marija Brozović

Dr. Branko Švarc (1894–1972) was a Croatian judge and Mayor of Koprivnica.

Švarc was born in Koprivnica to a Croatian Jewish family. His father was suits trader. Švarc was educated in Prague and Zagreb. He was an active member of the "Academics Club" and later a member of the numerous societies in Koprivnica. Švarc was married to Marija (née Brozović) Švarc, sister of a notable veterinary historian Leander Brozović. In 1932 he was elected as a Mayor of Koprivnica, position which he held until 1937. During World War II Švarc joined the Partisans. In Varaždin Švarc held the position of a judge. Švarc died in 1972 and is buried in a Jewish part of Koprivnica cemetery.

== Bibliography ==
- Kraus, Ognjen (1998). Dva stoljeća povijesti i kulture Židova u Zagrebu i Hrvatskoj. Zagreb: Židovska općina Zagreb. ISBN 953-96836-2-9.
