= Rovci, Croatia =

Settlement in Koprivnica-Križevci County, Croatia

Rovci
- Settlement
- Interactive map of Rovci
- Location of Rovci in Croatia
- Coordinates: 46°01′40″N 16°21′05″E
- Country: Croatia
- County: Koprivnica-Križevci
- Municipality: Sveti Petar Orehovec

Area
  - Total: 1.2 km^{2} (0.46 sq mi)

Population (2021)
  - Total: 13
  - Density: 11/km^{2} (28/sq mi)
- Time zone: UTC+1 (CET)
  - Summer (DST): UTC+2 (CEST)
- Postal code: 48260 Križevci

Rovci is a settlement in the Municipality of Sveti Petar Orehovec in Croatia. In 2021, its population was 13.

== Demographics ==
Rovci: Population trends 1857–2021
v

population								40	106	88	99	82	35	22	24	14	13
	1857	1869	1880	1890	1900	1910	1921	1931	1948	1953	1961	1971	1981	1991	2001	2011	2021

Sources: Croatian Bureau of Statistics publications
