= Poljana Križevačka =

Coordinates: 45°58′10″N 16°32′20″E

- Village
- Interactive map of Poljana Križevačka
- Country: Croatia
- County: Koprivnica-Križevci County
- Municipality: Križevci

Area
  - Total: 5.1 km^{2} (2.0 sq mi)

Population (2021)
  - Total: 302
  - Density: 59/km^{2} (150/sq mi)
- Time zone: UTC+1 (CET)
  - Summer (DST): UTC+2 (CEST)

Poljana Križevačka is a village in Croatia.
