= Alfred Švarc =

- Born: Alfred Schwarz; April 24, 1907
- Died: November 21, 1986 (aged 79)
- Era: 20th century
- Works: http://quercus.mic.hr/quercus/person/392

Alfred Švarc or Schwarz, composer and lawyer, was born on April 24, 1907, in Križevci, Croatia, Austria-Hungary where he died on November 21, 1986.

== Biography ==
While still a child he "discovered his musicality" and started to learn the piano at the age of seven. While attending high school in Zagreb, he went on with his piano studies in the class of Ernest Krauth in the Music Academy's Secondary School. He attained a degree at the Law Faculty at which he got a bachelor's in 1933 and acquired a doctorate. In parallel with his studies in the law, Švarc continued to be absorbed in music, and enrolled a class of conducting at the Music Academy's College. Alfred Švarc (then spelled Schwarz) is also recorded as having been a student of composition in the class of Blagoje Bersa at the Music Academy in Zagreb, as confirmed by Bersa's diary entry for October 14, 1929. The first presentation and reception of Alfred Švarc as a composer occurred at the 18th Public Performance of the State Music Academy in which compositions of graduates of the school of Blagoje Bersa were played. In the company of Miroslav Magdalenić and Emil Cipra, Švarc introduced himself with his First String Quartet, written in 1930. In a review of the young composers' evening, Pavao Markovac wrote that European models were to be seen in Švarc, while Božidar Širola observed: “A. Schwarz is endeavouring to become free and to create from himself, without models, or rather, according to Romantic and modern models.”

== Oeuvre ==
Alfred Švarc belongs among composers who at the time when Croatian music was dominated by the neo-national course chose his own path in composition, based on late Romantic and the then prevailing compositional and technical forms of expression. Disappointed with the composing course for the Academy did not offer him what he had imagined, Švarc got a job in 1933 in Križevci in the law, and also worked in Daruvar and Bjelovar. For almost twenty years, 1930 – 1950, he composed nothing, although during World War II, he did go in for music while imprisoned in Osnabrück, where he ran a choir of the inmates. Švarc filled the period in which he did not compose with an intensive study of melody, harmony and polyphony, their interdependence and unity. When in 1950 he went back to composing, while performing the duties of judge in Glina from 1945 to 1969, he endeavoured to make up for lost time with really vigorous creative work, building up his own composing style. His works are characterised by individually conceived melodic lines, original and specific harmony solutions, a lush polyphony and above all richness of content and profoundly felt music. The more than one hundred works in his oeuvre tend to make great demands on the performer, which is perhaps the reason that only nine works were ever presented to the public during his lifetime, including the two student works First String Quartet (1930) and Etude for Piano (1930), as well as seven works from his maturity: String Quartet in A Major (1951), Fragments from the War for choir (1955), the symphonic poem Song of the Young Hero (1958), the orchestral Overture to a Merry Play (1961), Songs of My Grief for alto and orchestra (1962), Miniatures for Piano (1965) and Concerto for Piano, Violin and Cello (1973).

== Works ==
- Symphony No 1 "Dramatic" (1952)
- String Quartet No 2 (1951)
- String Quartet No 3 (1951)
- String Quartet No 4 "Ways of Life" (1959)
- String Quartet No 5 (1960)
- String Quartet No 6 "Two Worlds" (1961)
- String Quartet No 7 "At the Bottom" (1961)
- Bakonja fra Brne, symphonic poem (1958)
- Sleepless Night Op 56 for voice and piano
- Dundo Maroje, symphonic poem (1959)
- Eroica, symphonic poem (1956)
- Fragments from the War for choir and orchestra (1955)
- Small Town Near the River for voice and piano
- String Quartet
- One Word for voice and piano
- Kadinjača, symphonic poem, Op 25 (1954)
- Rain in the Night for voice and piano
- Chamber Symphony (1956)
- At the River for voice and piano
- King Lear, symphonic poem (1959)
- Plague's House, symphonic poem (1954)
- Lyricalf Balance for voice and piano (1955)
- Love for voice and piano
- Love Thy Neighbour, symphonic poem (1961)
- Miniatures for piano
- After a Parting for voice and piano
- Hope for voice and piano
- Hands Found for voice and piano
- Innocence of the Other Shore for voice and orchestra
- Night Op 56 for voice and piano
- Night in Tito's Užic, cantata (1956)
- About a Young Hero, symphonic poem (1958)
- Questions for voice and piano
- Song to a Mountain for voice and piano
- Songs of My Sorrow for voice and piano (1962)
- Sunken Branch of the Night for voice and piano
- The Return Without a Home, cantata (1960)
- Prelude for a Joyful Dance (1961)
- Spring for voice and piano
- One Ought to Change the Course for voice and piano
- Requiem, cantata (1963)
- On the Other Side – symphonic poem of a young hero, Op 38
- Alone for voice and piano
- Just One Wound for voice and piano
- Dream for voice and piano (1968)
- Serenade, for string orchestra
- Symphony of Peace (1953)
- Symphony of Life (1958)
- Symphonic Variations and Fugue on a Folk Theme (1958)
- Sonata for piano (1951)
- Headquarters, cantata (1961)
- Things for voice and piano
- Twilight Op 56 for voice and piano
- All in Vain for mezzo-soprano and piano (1917)
- All the Knives in the World Op 56
- Theme, Variations and Fugue for orchestra (1951)
- It Is Here for voice and piano
- They Are Not Angels for voice and piano
- Tragic Overture (1961)
- Three Songs for voice and piano (1955)
- The Taming of the Shrew, symphonic poem (1960)
- Variations and Fugue "Jume, Jume" for orchestra (1955)
- Variations on a Folk Theme for string quartet (1959)
- Evening for voice and piano
- The Merry Wives of Windsor, symphonic poem (1962)
- I Believe for choir and orchestra (1960)
