= Miholec =

Coordinates: 46°03′N 16°26′E

- Village
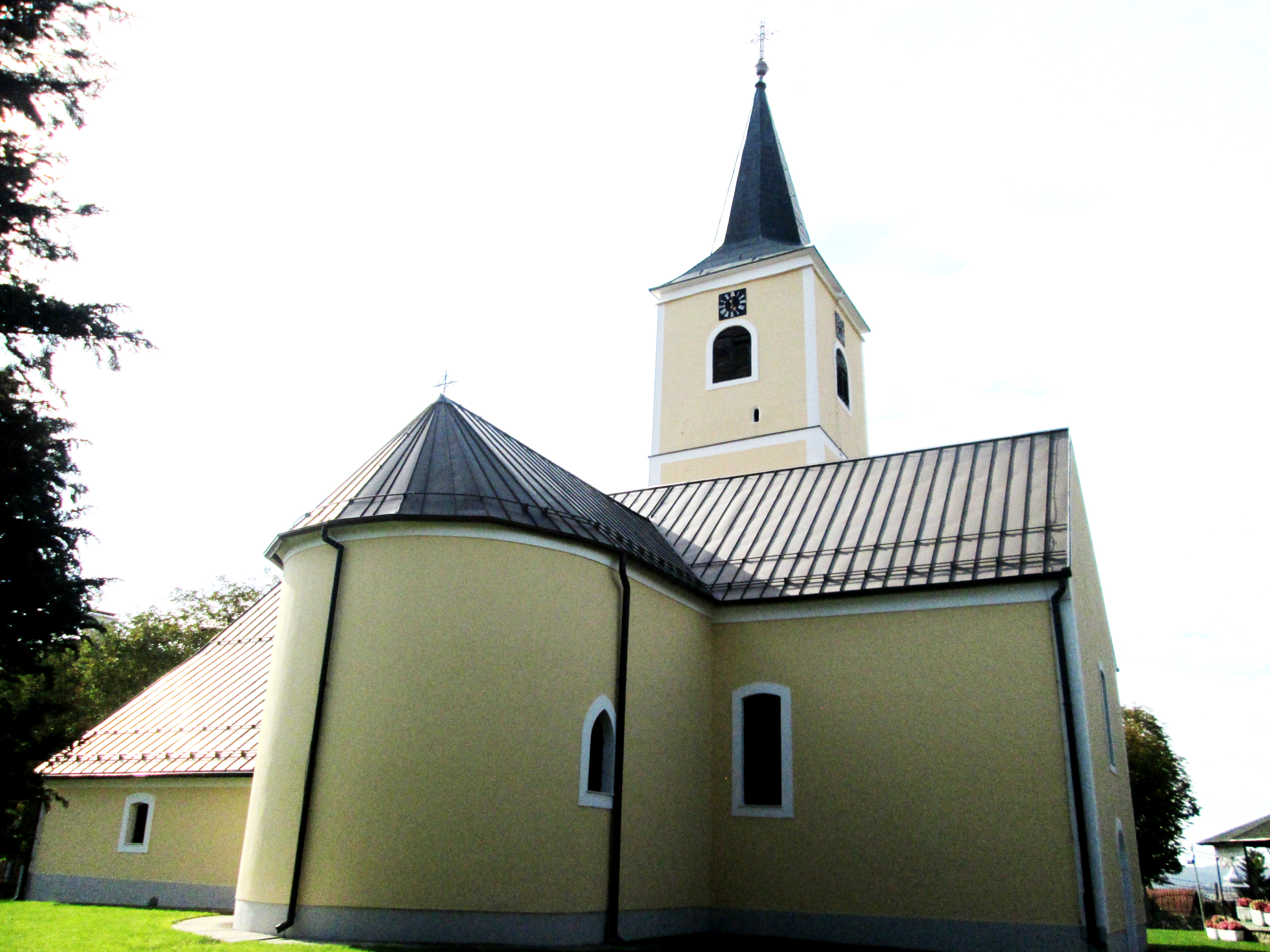
- St. Michael Church in Miholec, Croatia.
- Interactive map of Miholec
- Country: Croatia

Area
  - Total: 7.9 km^{2} (3.1 sq mi)

Population (2021)
  - Total: 322
  - Density: 41/km^{2} (110/sq mi)
- Time zone: UTC+1 (CET)
  - Summer (DST): UTC+2 (CEST)

Miholec is a village in Croatia.
