= Veliki Potočec =

Coordinates: 46°03′N 16°34′E

- Village
- Interactive map of Veliki Potočec
- Country: Croatia
- County: Karlovac County

Area
  - Total: 2.2 sq mi (5.7 km^{2})

Population (2021)
  - Total: 360
  - Density: 160/sq mi (63/km^{2})
- Time zone: UTC+1 (CET)
  - Summer (DST): UTC+2 (CEST)

Veliki Potočec is a village in Croatia.
