= Petar Keglević =

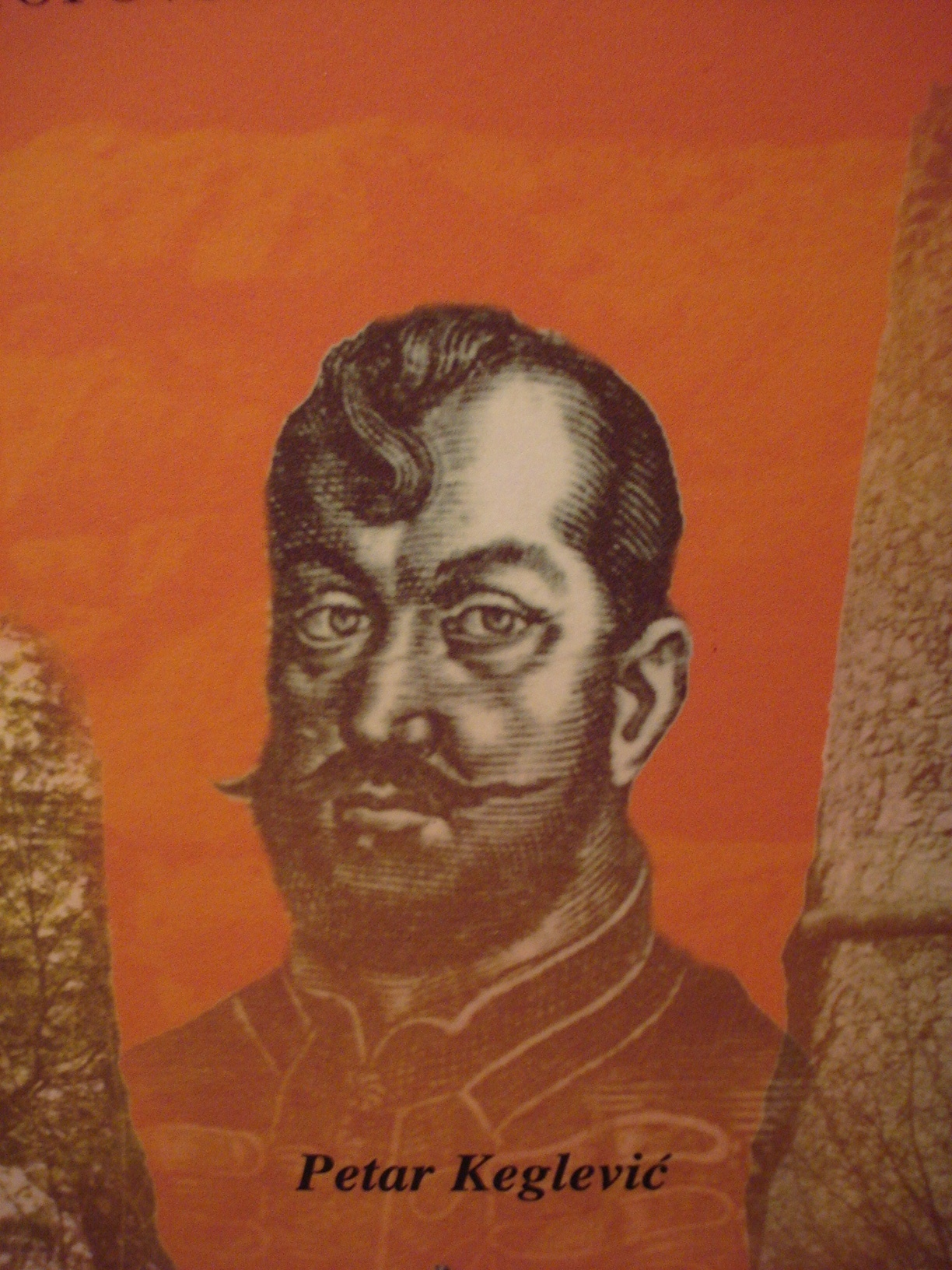

Ban of Croatia
- In office 9 December 1537 – 1 November 1542
- Preceded by: Louis Pekry
- Succeeded by: Nikola Šubić Zrinski

Personal details
- Died: 1554 or 1555
- Resting place: Church of the Assumption of the Blessed Virgin Mary, Pregrada, Croatia

Military service
- Battles/wars: Siege of Jajce (1521)

Petar Keglević II of Bužim (died in 1554 or 1555) was the ban of Croatia and Slavonia from 1537 to 1542. He was also a captain of Bihać from 1535 to 1539.

== Career ==
Keglević was captain from 1521 to 1522 and later ban of Jajce. In 1526, some months before the Battle of Mohács, he got the jus gladii, even though he did not take part in the battle (he arrived too late). In (1525 - 1526) he becomes one of the captains and chief officers of the royal Hussars. From 25 May 1533 to 9 December 1537, he was the royal commissary for Croatia and Slavonia as attorney general. From 1537 to 1542, he was the ban of Croatia and Slavonia.

The Battle of Mohács was very traumatic. The history of the persons who were relevant after that - among them also Petar Keglević - is described again and again. A part of Zagreb is still named after him. He distinguished himself in battles against the Ottoman Empire and he achieved a special agreement. After the battle of Mohács, he sided with Emperor Ferdinand against János Szapolyai. Zápolya had made a Franco-Hungarian alliance. Petar Keglević made a special agreement with the Ottoman Empire. The result was a Franco-Ottoman alliance and as an unintended consequence moved Jeronimo Bassano from Venice to England (see also: Ottoman–Venetian War ). This architecture of Europe should be kept for centuries.

He increased his family's holdings through purchases (Kostel and Krapina) and royal gifts (Bijela Stijena near Pakrac, Lobor, Novigrad (the permission to build novi grad, i.e. "new towns"), Zsámbék, Perbál, Tök and Fürstenfeld).

After the death of Keglević's son-in-law Gašpar Ernušt in 1540, he assumed ownership of his possessions in Međimurje, northernmost part of Croatia, and stayed in fortified Čakovec Castle but was later forced by Nikola Šubić Zrinski to leave it.

In 1542, he was sentenced as an infidel by the Diet in Pressburg, because of his special agreement with the Ottoman Empire and because of the unlawful ownership of Međimurje. Croato-Hungarian King and Holy Roman Emperor Ferdinand removed him from his position as ban and confiscated his properties in 1542 (see also: Little War in Hungary (1543)). He moved south to Lika region and led the Croatian military forces that defeated the Turkish army in the battle of Otočac in 1543.

One of the sons of Petar Keglević moved to Valladolid (see: Conflicts with the Ottoman Empire) and Mehmed-paša Sokolović became Commander of the Imperial Squires and later Grand Vizier. Emperor Ferdinand imprisoned Keglević in 1546 in house arrest in one of his own houses of his own choice. In 1548 he was granted an amnesty and was returned all of his goods along with his grandfather's Bužim. In the year 1552 Emperor Ferdinand visited him as a private person and brought him news from Valladolid.

He was not involved in the dynastic fight between the Habsburgs and the Jagiellonians, although he made the business with George, Margrave of Brandenburg-Ansbach, so that this one pulled back from Hungary and Croatia.

Petar Keglević was married to Barbara Strezsemley from Streza (today Pavlin Kloštar near Bjelovar), from family Bissenus de Streza. Streza was the uncle of king Dmitar Zvonimir. Streza descended from Bissenus de genere Aba, who was a descendant of the Hungarian king Samuel Aba, a grandson of Géza, Grand Prince of the Hungarians. Count Petar VII Keglević is his descendant.

He died in 1554 or 1555.

== See also ==
- House of Keglević
- List of feudal lords of Međimurje

Preceded by Louis Pekry	Ban of Croatia; 1537-1542	Succeeded by Nikola Šubić Zrinski
