= Guščerovec =

Coordinates: 46°03′N 16°29′E

- Village
- Interactive map of Guščerovec
- Country: Croatia
- County: Koprivnica-Križevci County

Area
  - Total: 3.7 km^{2} (1.4 sq mi)

Population (2021)
  - Total: 160
  - Density: 43/km^{2} (110/sq mi)
- Time zone: UTC+1 (CET)
  - Summer (DST): UTC+2 (CEST)

Guščerovec is a village in Croatia. It is connected by the D22 highway.
