= Bosiljevo =

- Municipality
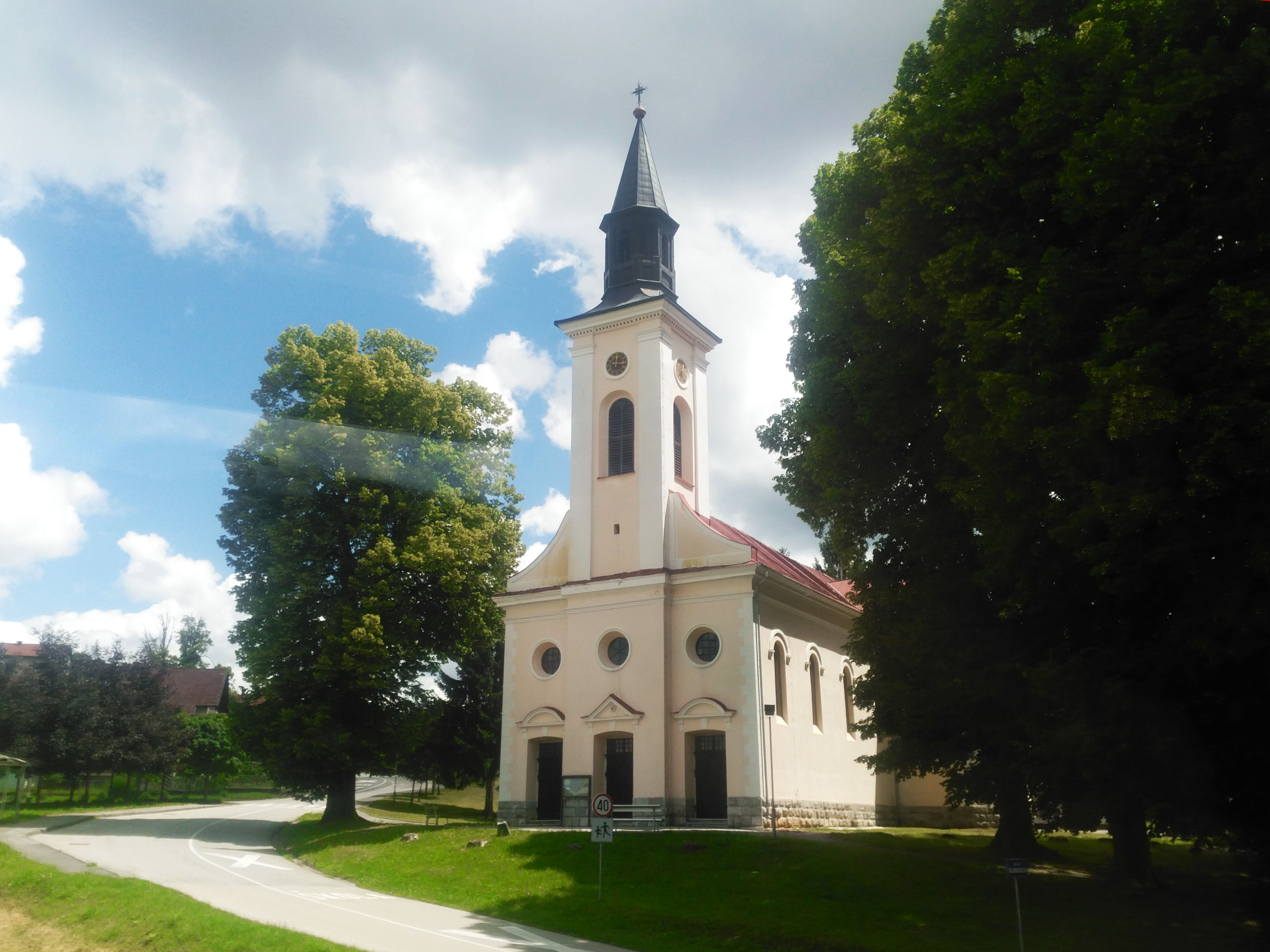

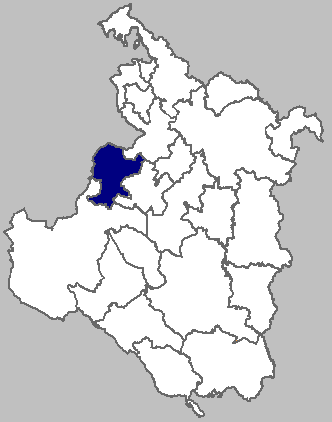
- Map of Bosiljevo within Karlovac County

- Location of Bosiljevo in Croatia
- Coordinates: 45°24′N 15°18′E
- Country: Croatia
- County: Karlovac County

Area
  - Municipality: 111.5 km^{2} (43.1 sq mi)
  - Urban: 0.3 km^{2} (0.12 sq mi)

Population (2021)
  - Municipality: 1,040
  - Density: 9.33/km^{2} (24.2/sq mi)
  - Urban: 44
  - Urban density: 150/km^{2} (380/sq mi)
- Time zone: UTC+1 (CET)
  - Summer (DST): UTC+2 (CEST)
- Website: bosiljevo.hr

Bosiljevo is a village and municipality in Karlovac County, Croatia. It is located in the Gorski Kotar region, 25 km south-west from Karlovac, on the highways A1 and A6 leading to Zagreb, Rijeka and Split.

== Name ==
It was recorded as Boszilieuo on the 1673 map of Stjepan Glavač.

== Settlements ==
The total population of the municipality is 1,284, in the following forty-three settlements (villages and hamlets):

- Beč, population 9
- Bitorajci, population 16
- Bosanci, population 40
- Bosiljevo, population 63
- Dani, population 8
- Dugače, population 14
- Fratrovci, population 31
- Fučkovac, population 23
- Glavica, population 34
- Grabrk, population 117
- Hrsina, population 41
- Jančani, population 26
- Johi, population 33
- Kasuni, population 58
- Korenić Brdo, population 2
- Kraljevo Selo, population 2
- Krč Bosiljevski, population 27
- Laslavići, population 1
- Lipošćaki, population 14
- Lisičina Gorica, population 5
- Malik, population 24
- Mateše, population 59
- Milani, population 10
- Novo Selo Bosiljevsko, population 25
- Orišje, population 50
- Otok na Dobri, population 60
- Podrebar, population 18
- Podumol, population 30
- Potok Bosiljevski, population 5
- Pribanjci, population 126
- Rendulići, population 10
- Resnik Bosiljevski, population 16
- Sela Bosiljevska, population 69
- Skoblić Brdo, population 2
- Soline, population 38
- Spahići, population 32
- Strgari, population 14
- Špehari, population 1
- Umol, population 37
- Varoš Bosiljevski, population 18
- Vodena Draga, population 37
- Vrhova Gorica, population 8
- Žubrinci, population 31

== Geography ==
The Bosiljevo municipality is divided into four districts: Bosiljevo, Grabrk, Prikuplje and Vodena Draga.

It is situated between the rivers Kupa (the western part lying roughly along the Slovenia-Croatia border) and Dobra. To the south, the municipality shares borders with the Primorje-Gorski Kotar County and the town of Vrbovsko, to the south-east Ogulin, to the east Generalski Stol, and Netretić to the north.

Located in Gorski Kotar, the area's landscape is shaped by karst relief, and its most prominent features are the hills Družac and Privis, which stand at 469 and 461 meters respectively. The geology and climate of the region have traditionally been well-suited for pastoralism.

== Climate ==
Since records began in 1981, the highest temperature recorded at the local weather station was 39.6 °C (103.3 °F), on 8 August 2013. The coldest temperature was −23.9 °C (−11.0 °F), on 13 February 1985.

== History ==
Bosiljevo castle floor plan

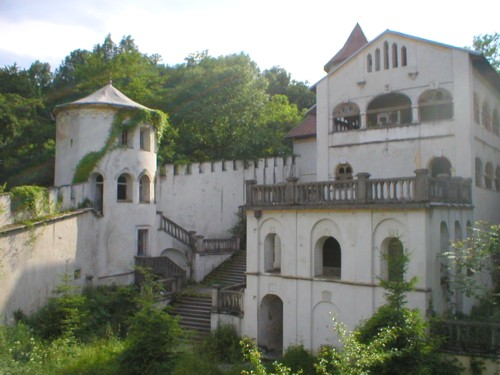
Bosiljevo castle

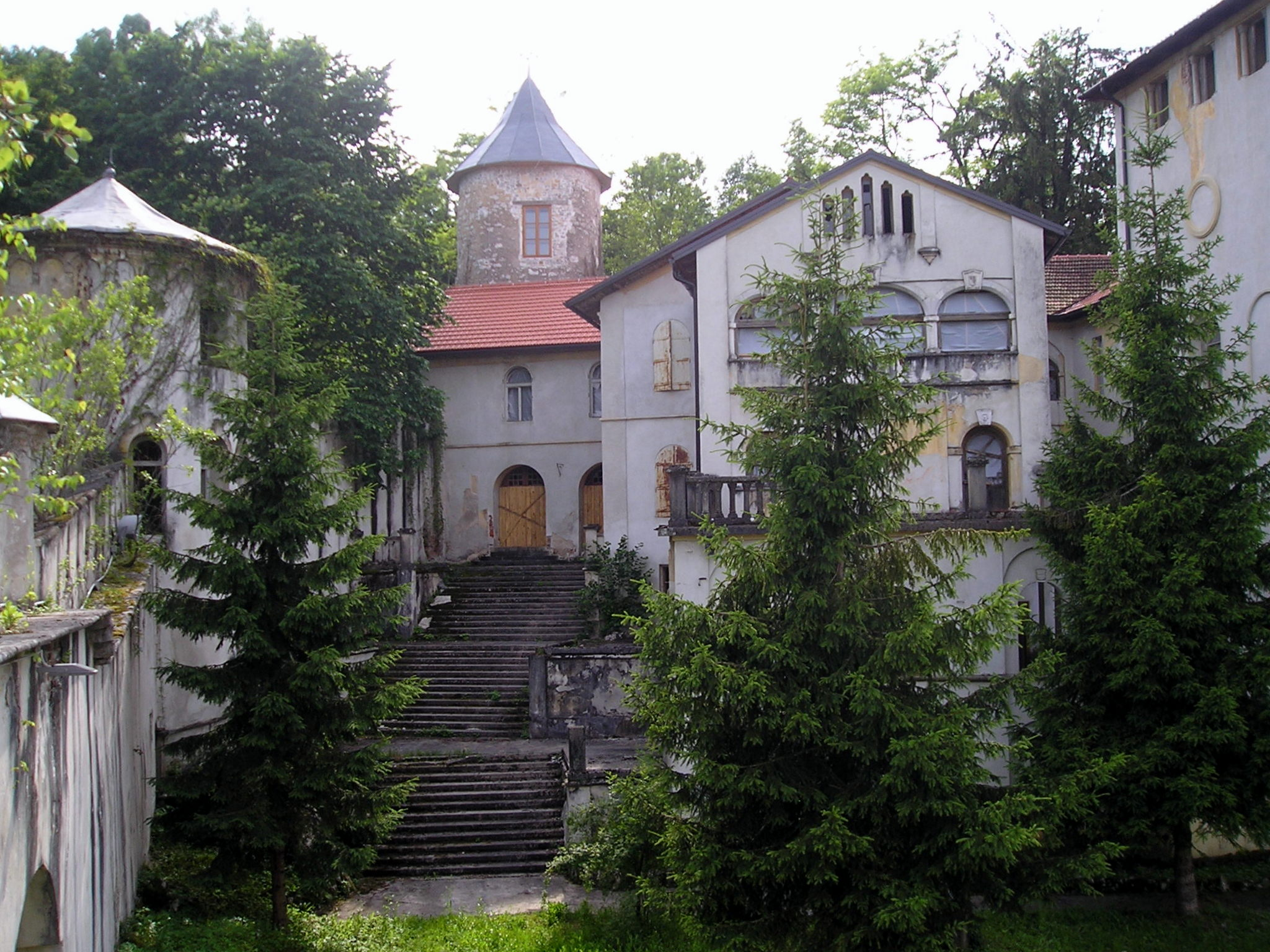
Bosiljevo castle (later)

The area has been inhabited since the Neolithic period, as evidenced by pottery found in a site near the village of Hrsina.

The earliest references to Bosiljevo date back to documents from the year 1334 when Ivan the Archdeacon of Gorica mentioned the parish church of Sancti Mauri in Bozilio in the constitution of the Zagreb bishopric. The Bosiljevo castle was most likely built in the early 15th century, and its first owner was Bartol IX Frankopan, a member of the Frankopan family.

During the fortification of Karlovac in 1588, Bosiljevo was part of its supply chain, being counted together with Dubovac, Novigrad and Ribnik. Ozalj owed the same as all of these four. Each owed 6 carts of timber, and although there were complaints about the conduct of the soldiers stationed in Karlovac, the order was complied with.

For the fortification of For the fortification of Ivanić in 1598, Bosiljevo and Novigrad had to supply 30 labourers.

On 17 September 1602, the županijski sudac Bernardo Severšić issued from Bosiljevo a judgement on a case between the Frankapan family members Juraj, Nikola and Vuk on the one hand ant the Vlachs of Gomirje on the other.

On 30 September 1632, a document written by a committee including Ivan Adam à Vernegg and Zagreb cleric Ivan Somogy tasked with delimiting the border between the possessions of the Zrinski family and of the Frankapan family was written in Bosiljevo.

On 9 June 1774, Gregorij Knežić lord of Bosiljevo drew up in Bosiljevo on behalf of the widow lady Ana Vojković and her housekeeper Elizabeth de Pozzi a list of duties of freemen in Jadrč and Osojnik. The transcript survives in the HDA in Zagreb, and was published by Rudolf Strohal. The original survives in the HDA, and was published by Rudolf Strohal.

In 1870, the road through Štokani was repaired.

Cultural and historical monuments, such as the Castle Frankopan (which has been in a desolate state of frame since the nuns were expelled in the late 70's), the ruins of the Castle Steljnik, old mansions, churches and monasteries yield the county a certain attraction.

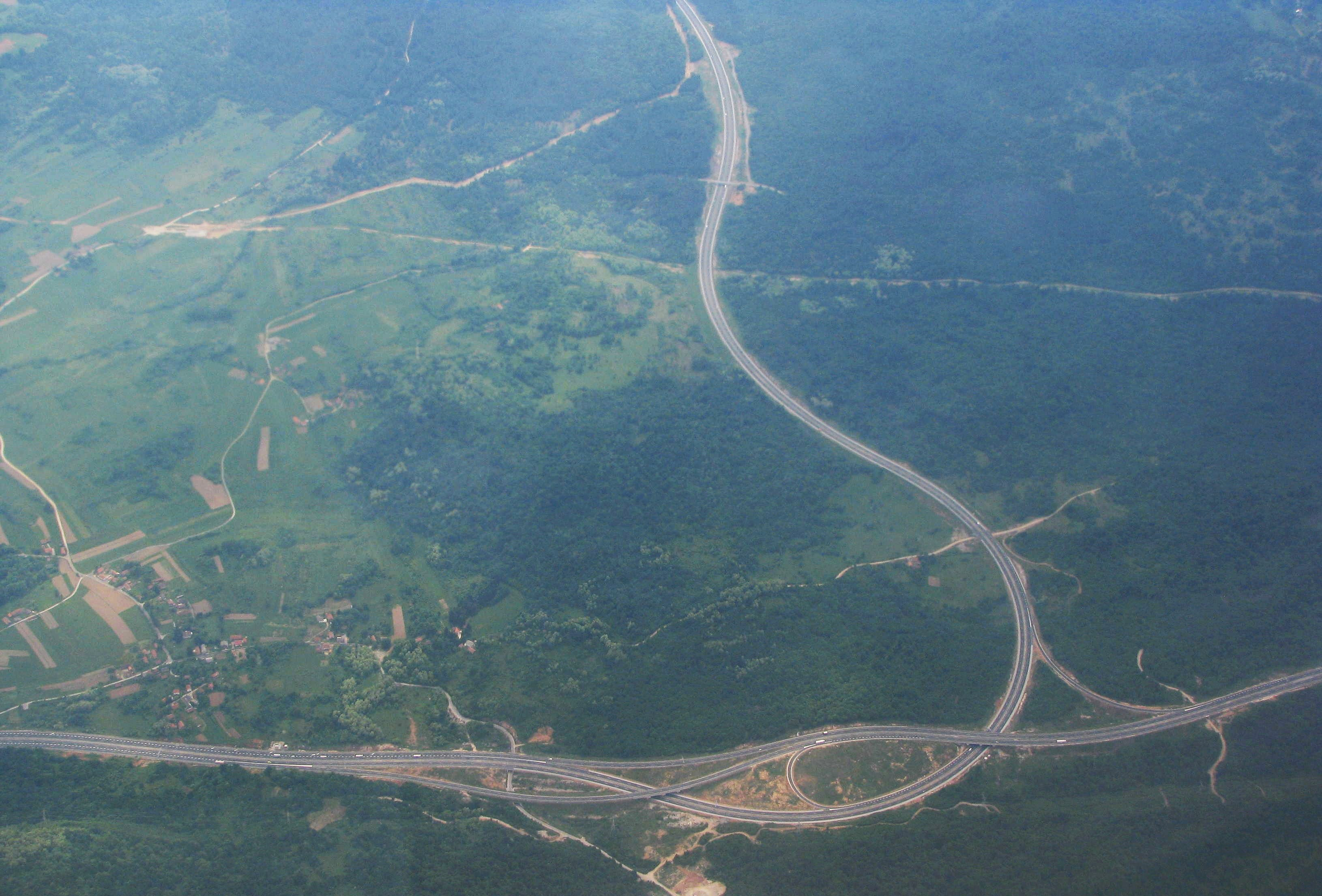
Bosiljevo 2 interchange

Two volunteer fire departments are presently active in Bosiljevo. The first one, DVD Bosiljevo, was founded on 2 December 1934 by Matija Bukovac. The other, DVD Grabrk, was founded on 17 June 1951. Together with the DVD Prikuplje in Ribnik, these make up the VZ Općine Bosiljevo.

There is also a local cultural club called "Frankopan" and the hunting club "Družac".

=== WWII ===
In July 1941, when the deportations of Serbs to accommodate the Slovenes of the population exchange commenced, the logornik in Vrbovsko informed his superiors that all the Serbs were in Moravice apart from two retired Serb gunmen in Severin na Kupi. For the temporary accommodation of Slovenes in Bosilhevo, the castle was offered for the housing of 30 people but for its occupation by the Italians.

At 21:00 on 21 June, a large group of Partisans attacked the arms depot in Bosiljevo. The attack lasted until 4:00 the next morning, but was ultimately repelled. A search of the grounds found much blood and a Mannlicher rifle, meaning there were losses on the Partisan side.

=== Recent ===
Bosiljevo has one post office, one tavern (stand 2006), two shops and the restaurant "Bosiljevo" in Bosanci, on the old road (Rijeka-Zagreb). The most important companies are "Maier-Textil" in Bosiljevo and the saw-mill "Korenić" in Orišje. With the new roads, Bosiljevo and the surrounding area are opening up for the future.

From 31 January to 2 February 2014, while S and SW geostrophic wind dominated, freezing rain fell on Gorski Kotar, glazing the entire region. It wrecked roofs, power lines an forests, causing power loss for about 14,000 households in Gorski Kotar, or about 80% of its population. Because of power lines falling on the A6, the highway was closed in of Rijeka between Bosiljevo and Kikovica, and between Kikovica and Delnice in the direction of Zagreb. It took about 10 days to restore essential infrastructure to the region, and within months electricity was back in most of its former range, but at a cost of about 84.4 million HRK to HEP. At the time it was the largest peacetime damage since its Secession from Yugoslavia, even without counting the forestry losses. Clearing blocked forestry roads and forest paths would take years, and thanks to the declining population some were never cleared.

== Governance ==
=== National ===
At the 1920 Kingdom of Serbs, Croats and Slovenes Constitutional Assembly election in Modruš-Rijeka County, Bosiljevo voted mainly for the Croatian People's Peasant Party.

Results at the poll in Bosiljevo
Year	Voters	Electors	NRS	DSD	KPJ	HPSS	Independent	SS	HSP	HZ
1920	770	470	2		1	450	1	4		12

=== Local ===
The current mayor of Bosiljevo County is Josip Korenić, also the owner of the Korenić saw mill in Orišje.

Municipal notaries:

- ? (–1871)

It is the seat of the Local Committee of Bosiljevo, encompassing itself, Beč, Bitorajci, Dugače, Fučkovac, Hrsina, Korenić Brdo, Kraljevo Selo, Krč Bosiljevski, Laslavići, Lisičina Gorica, Novo Selo Bosiljevsko, Orišje, Podrebar, Potok Bosiljevski, Rendulići, Resnik Bosiljevski, Skoblić Brdo, Strgari and Varoš Bosiljevski, Vrhova Gorica.

== Demographics ==
In 1811, the Vrbovski kanton comprised the kotari of Vrbovsko, Severin and Bosiljevo. The Bosiljevski kotar had a population of 3995 in 30 villages.

Religion in Vrbovsko Municipality (1890 census)
Religion	Percentage
Catholics	99.9%
Eastern Orthodox	0.1%

In 1890, the općina of Bosiljevo (court at Popovci), (Note: So the 1890 census. The 1910 census gave the location more generally, as "Bosiljevo".) with an area of 142 kilometres (88 mi), belonged to the kotar and electoral district of Vrbovsko (Vrbovsko court) in the županija of Modruš-Rieka (Ogulin court and financial board). There were 1051 houses (1102 in 1910), with a population of 7165 (the largest in Vrbovsko kotar): 3163 male and 4002 female; this fell to 6029 in 1910. The majority were Croatian or Serbian speakers, but 66 spoke Slovene, 7 Czech, 1 Hungarian, 1 German and 8 spoke other languages. The majority were Catholic, but 10 were Eastern Orthodox. Its 56 villages and 37 hamlets (Note: Counted simply as 48 villages in 1910.) were divided for taxation purposes into 16 porezne općine, under the Ogulin office.

In 1910, the entire općina had only one resident soldier. Militarily, Bosiljevo fell under the 26th Landwehr Infantry Regiment and 26th Landsturm Infantry Brigade, both at Karlovac.

According to the 2011 census, Bosiljevo has a population of 1,284 inhabitants, of which 97% are ethnic Croats. The local dialect is mixed Kajkavian-Chakavian.

The patron saint of Bosiljevo is St. Vitus the Martyr, who is celebrated on 15 June.

=== Further reading ===
- Kraljevski zemaljski statistički ured (May 1913). "Repertorij prebivališta po županijama, upravnim kotarima, gradovima, upravnim i poreznim općinama". Političko i sudbeno razdjeljenje i Repertorij prebivališta Kraljevina Hrvatske i Slavonije po stanju od 1. siječnja 1913. Zagreb: Kraljevska hrvatsko-slavonsko-dalmatinska zemaljska vlada, 🖶 Kraljevska zemaljska tiskara. pp. 1–126. Pages 31, 32.

== Governance ==
=== Judiciary ===
Karlovac was once the seat of the kotar court for an 1870 population of 53,148. In 1875, the kotar court of Karlovac was responsible for the općine: Karlovac city, Banija, Rečica, Draganić, Ozalj, Novigrad, Ribnik, Bosiljevo and Severin.

== Gallery ==
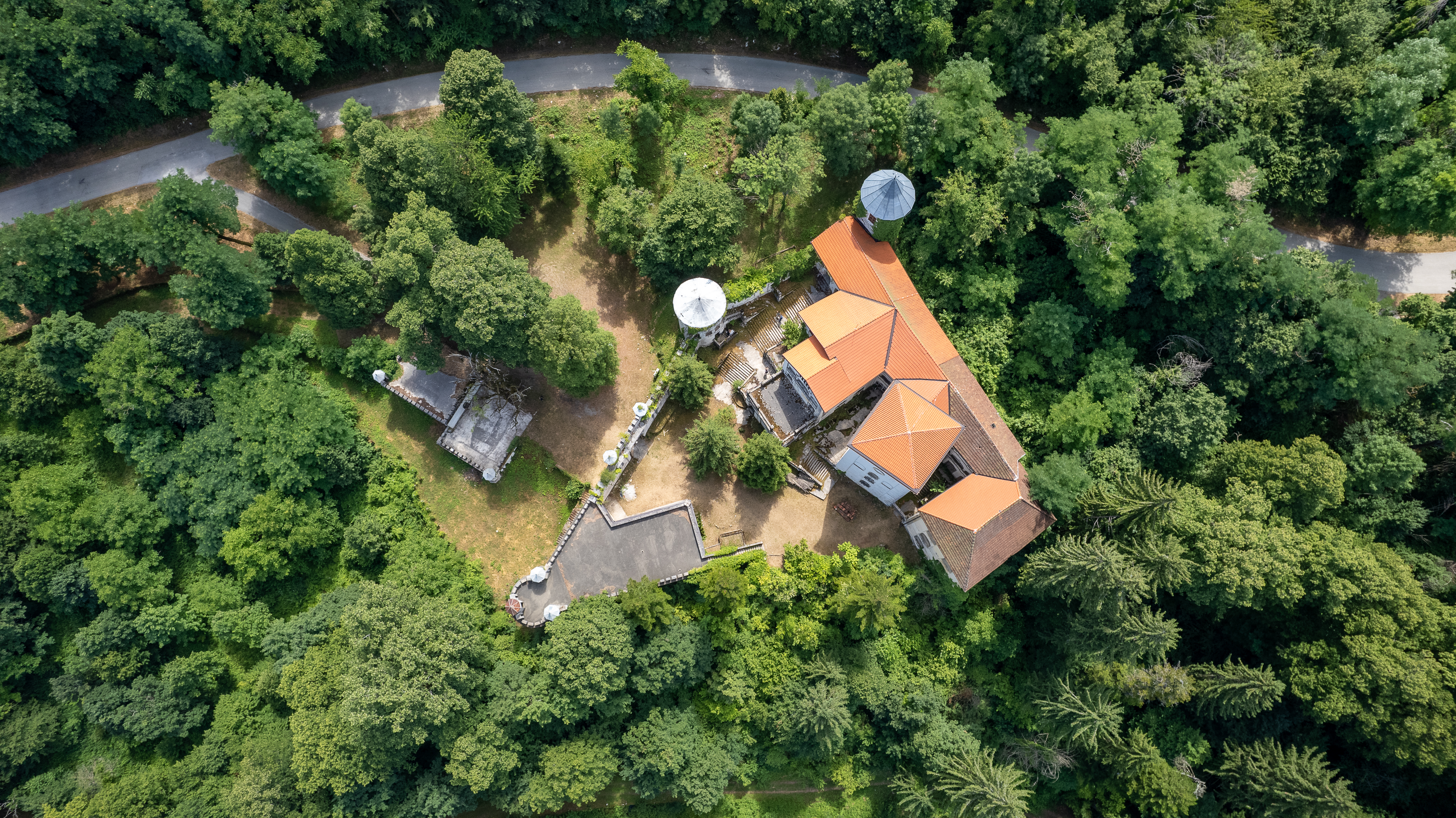
Castle from above

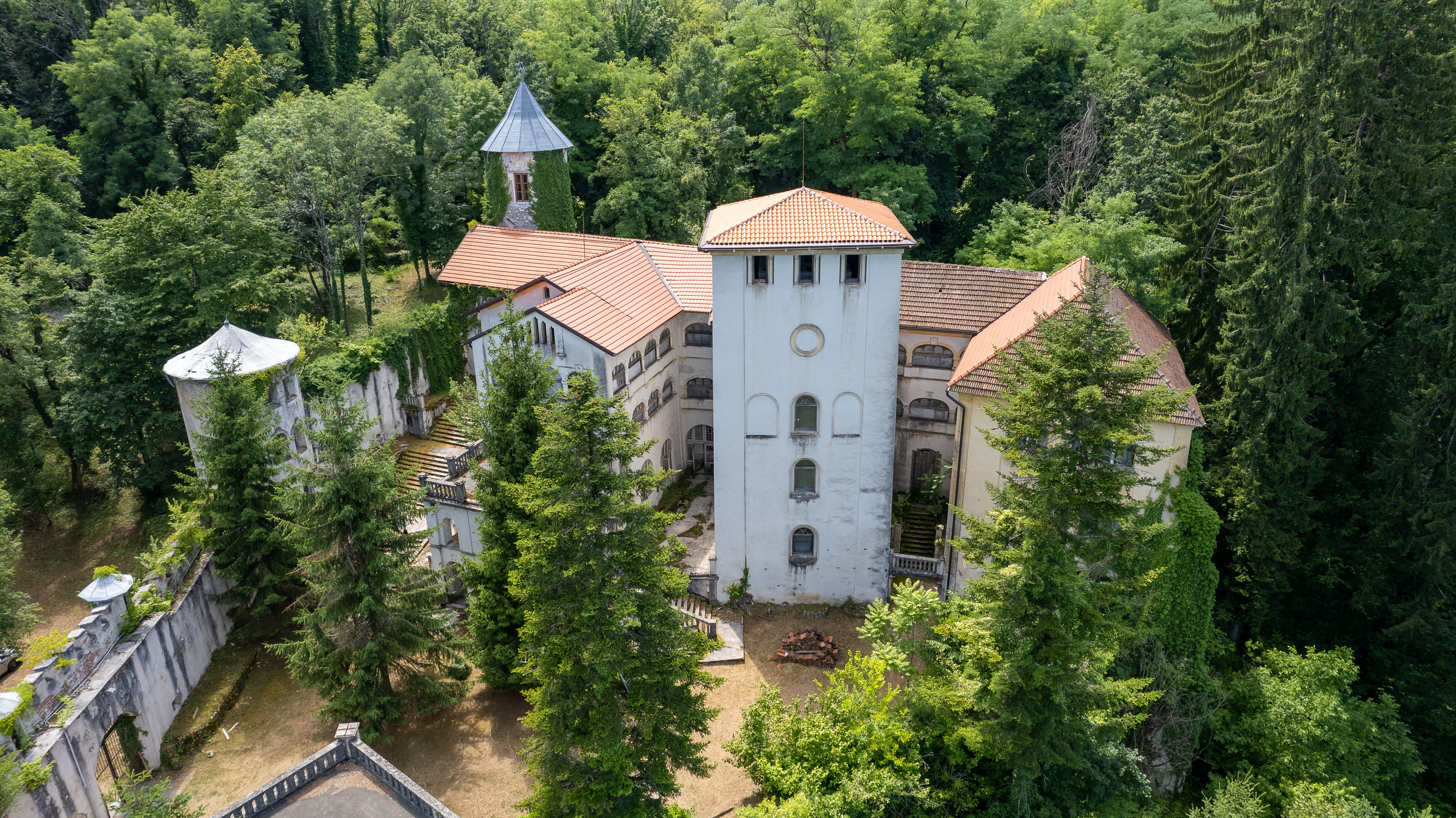
Tower from above

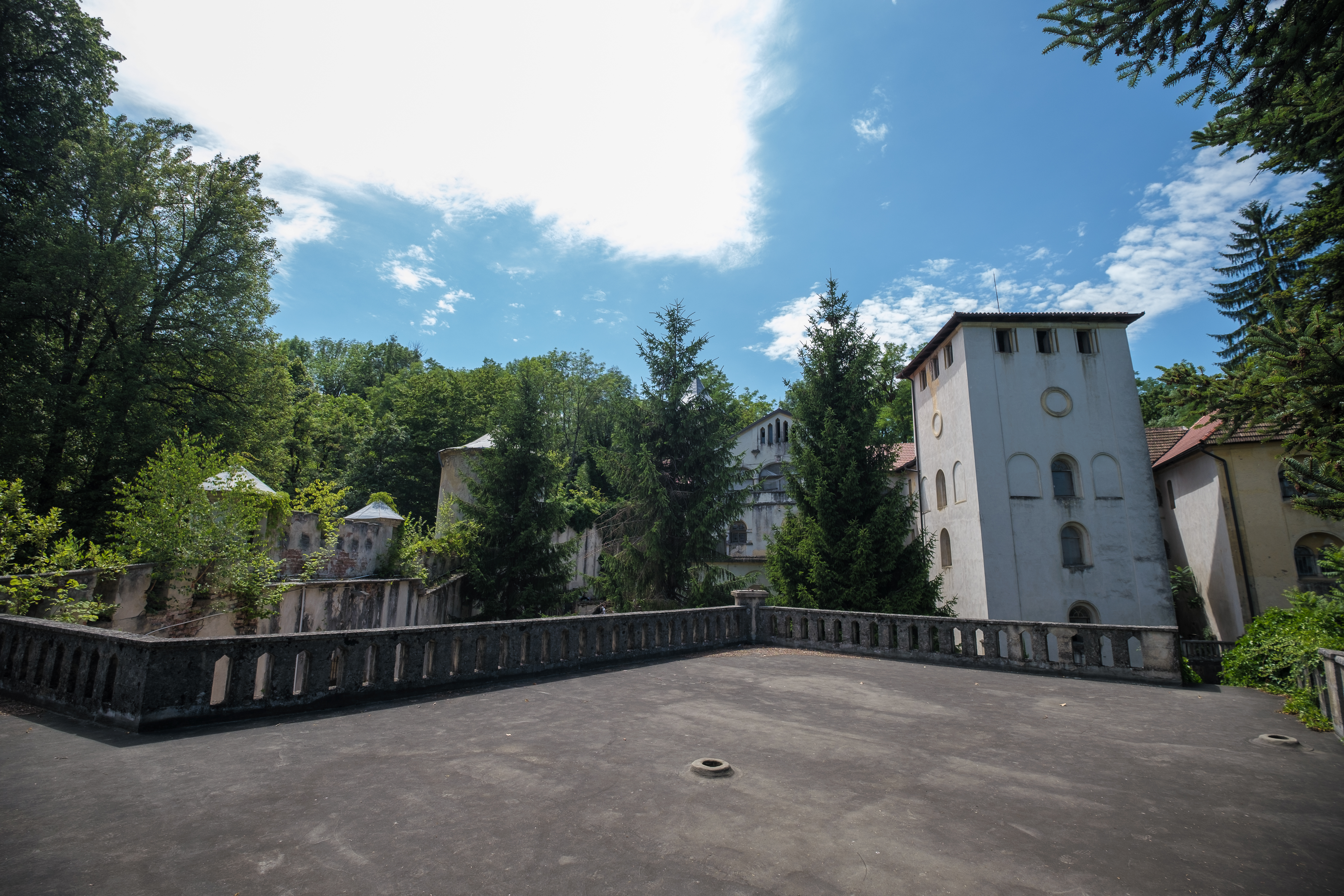
Castle

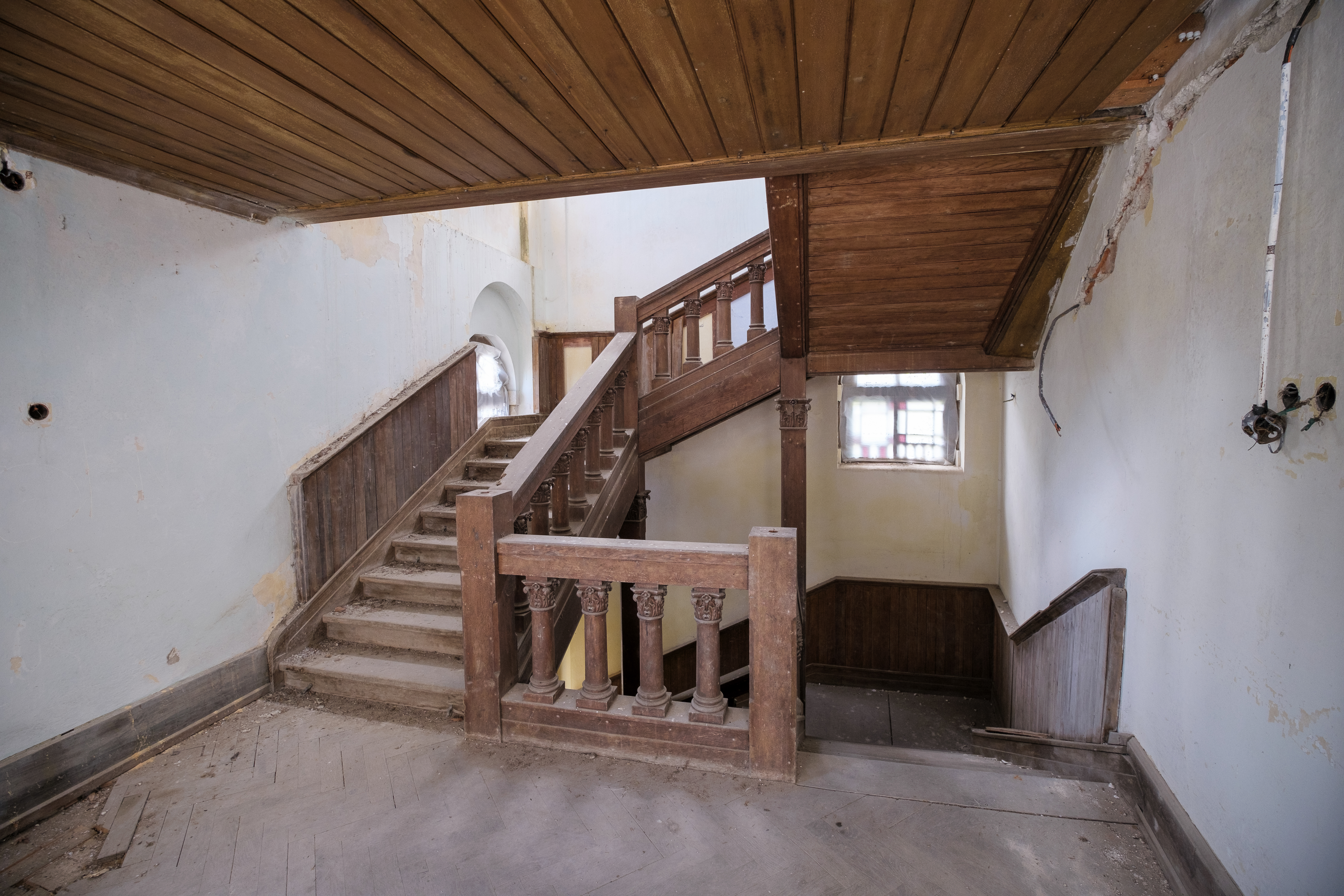
Castle interior

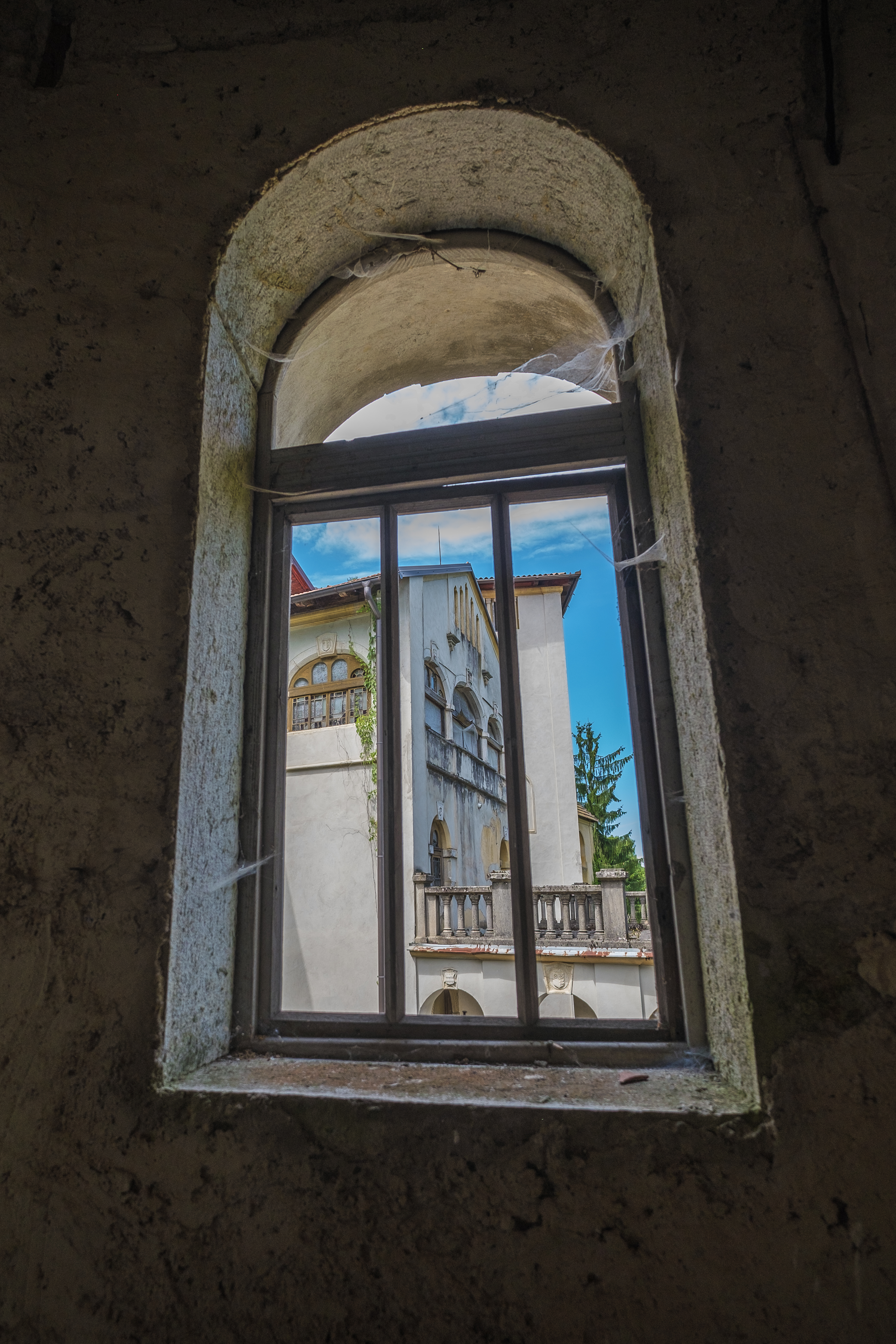
Window view

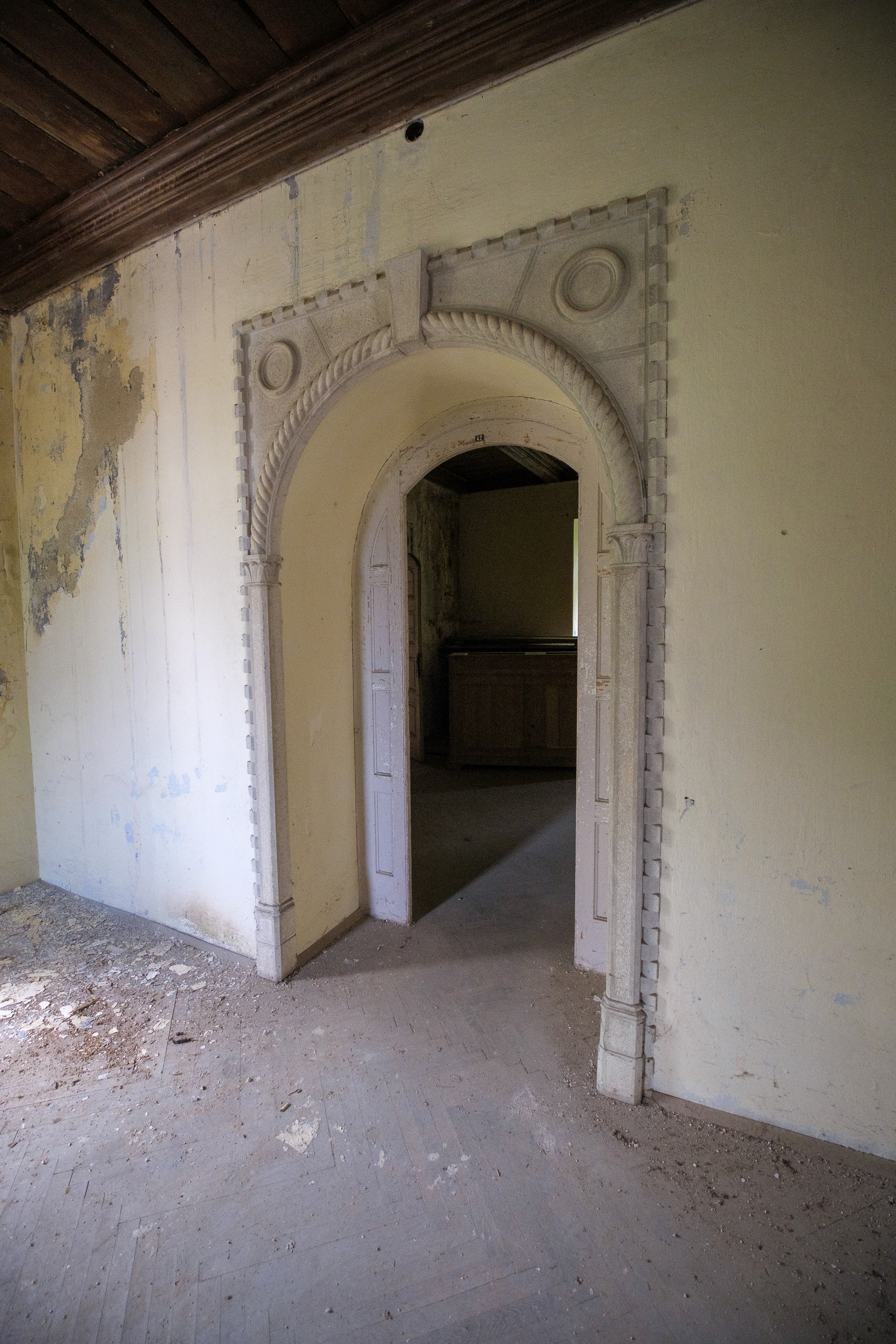
Castle doorway

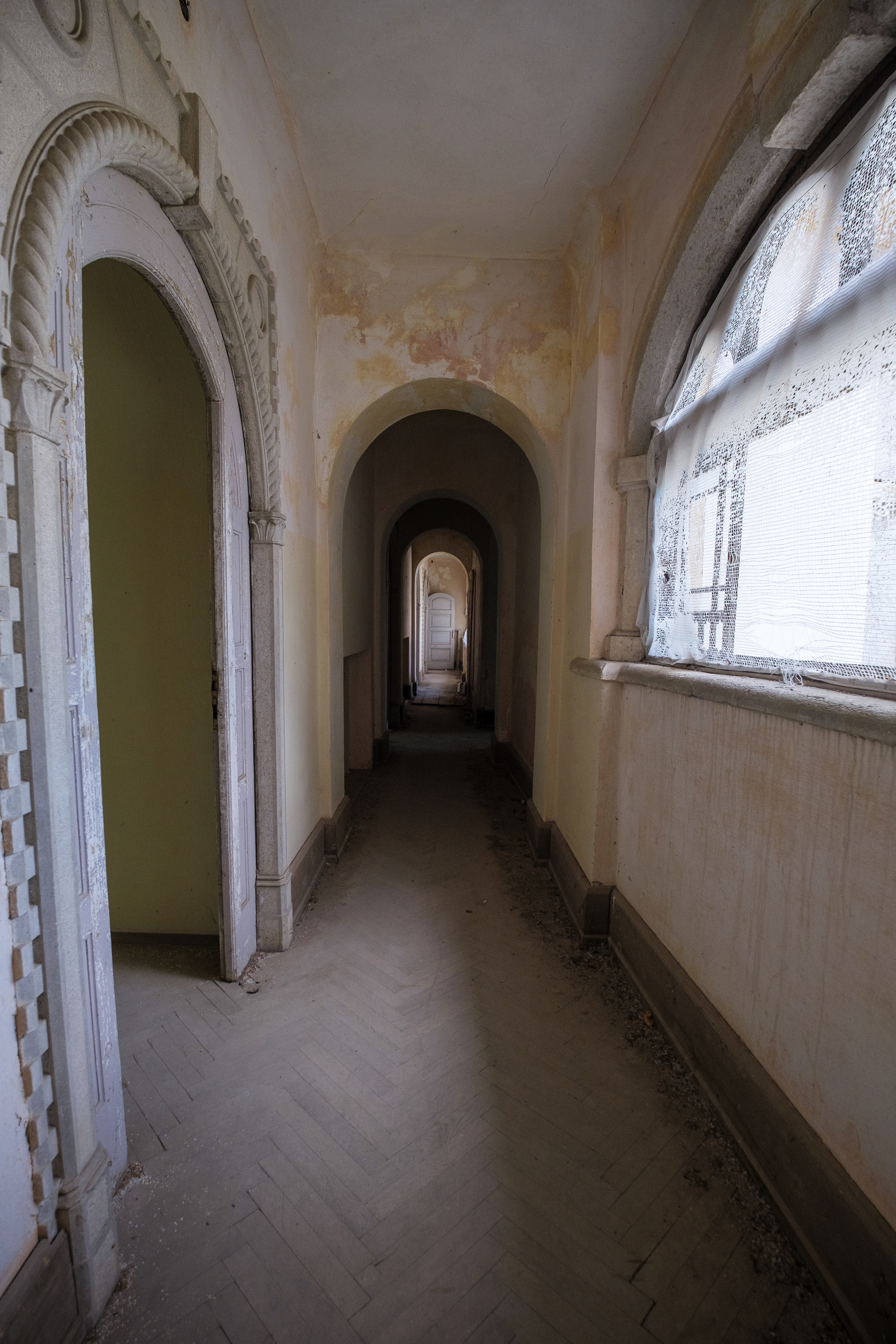
Hallway

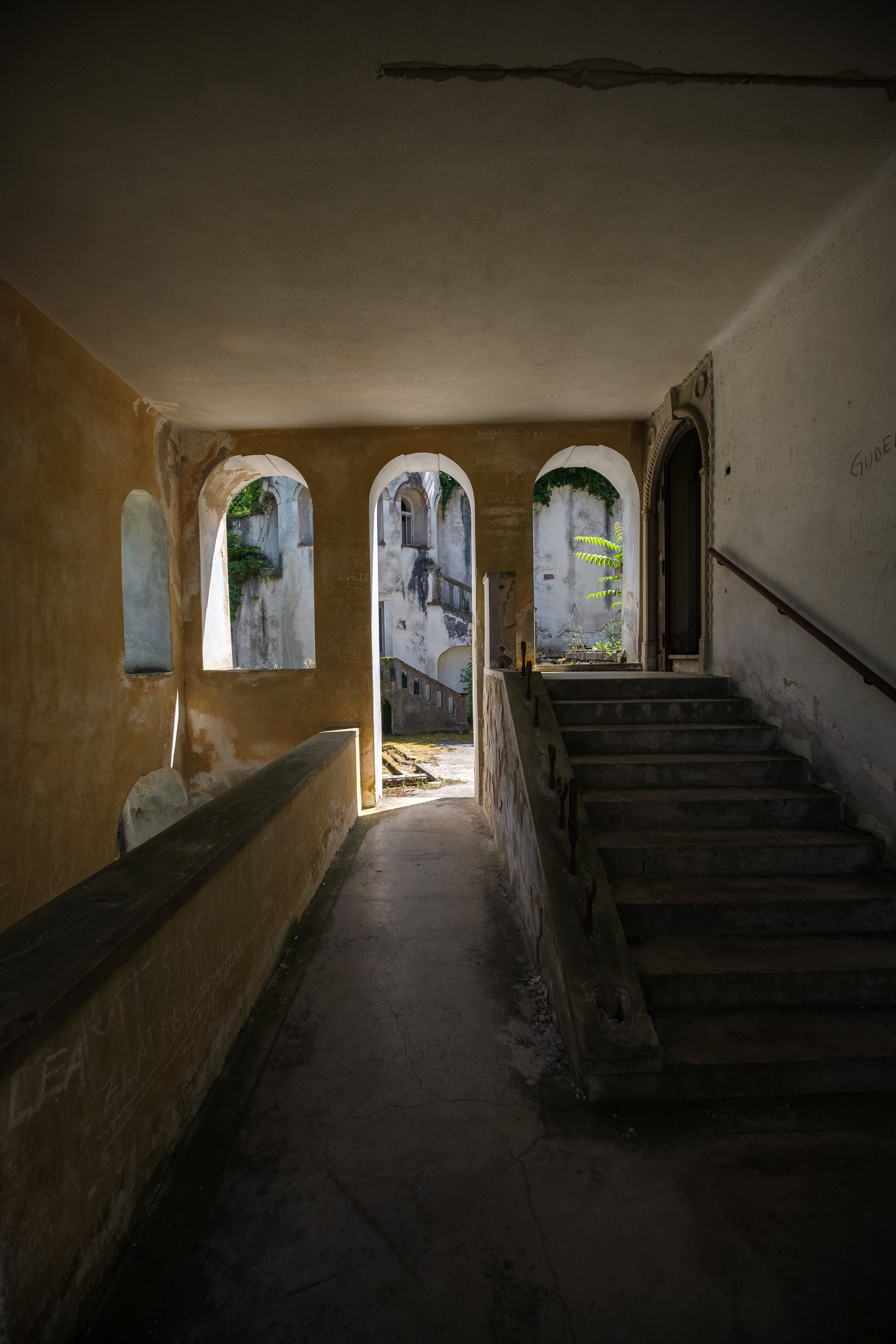
Archway

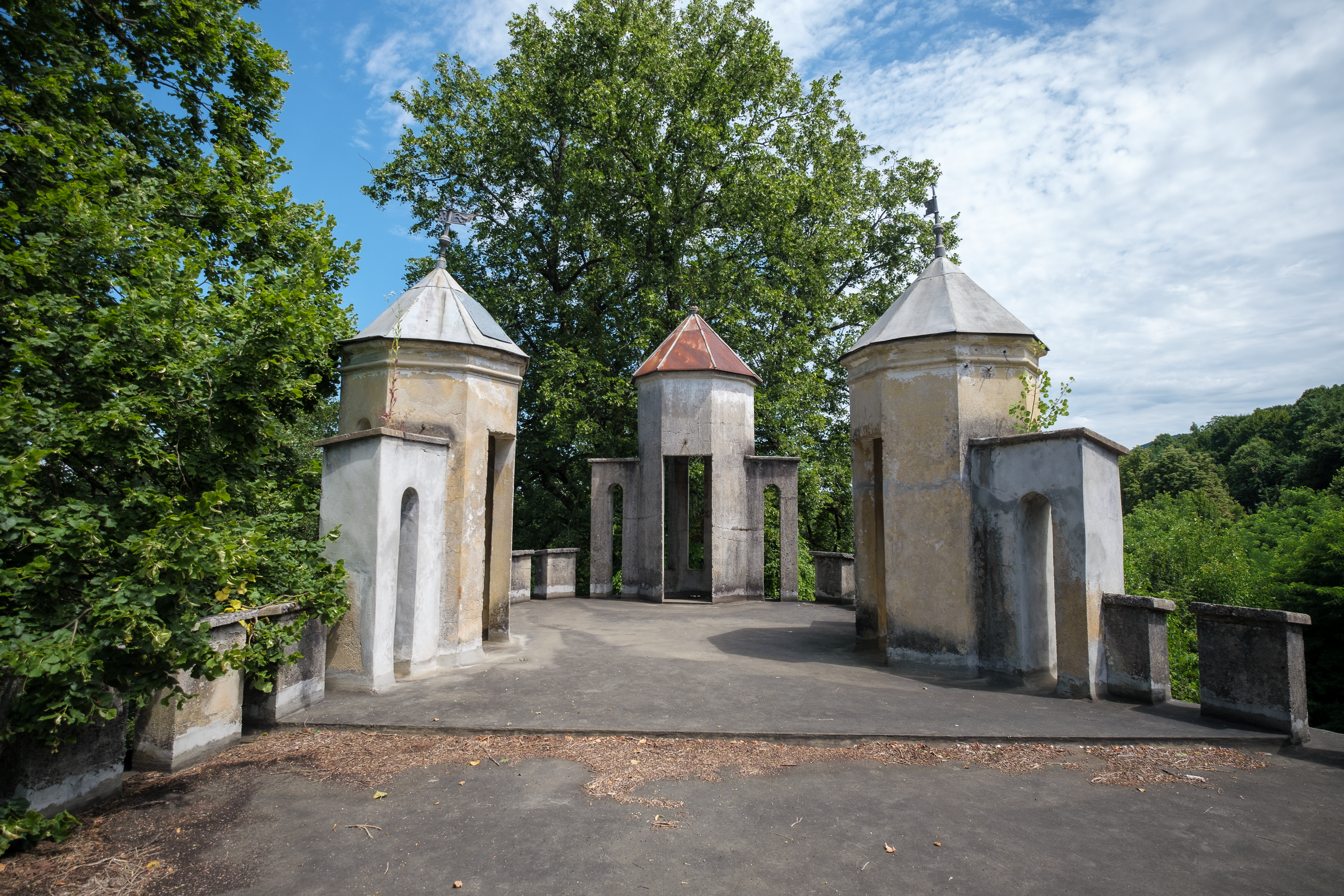
Castle lookout

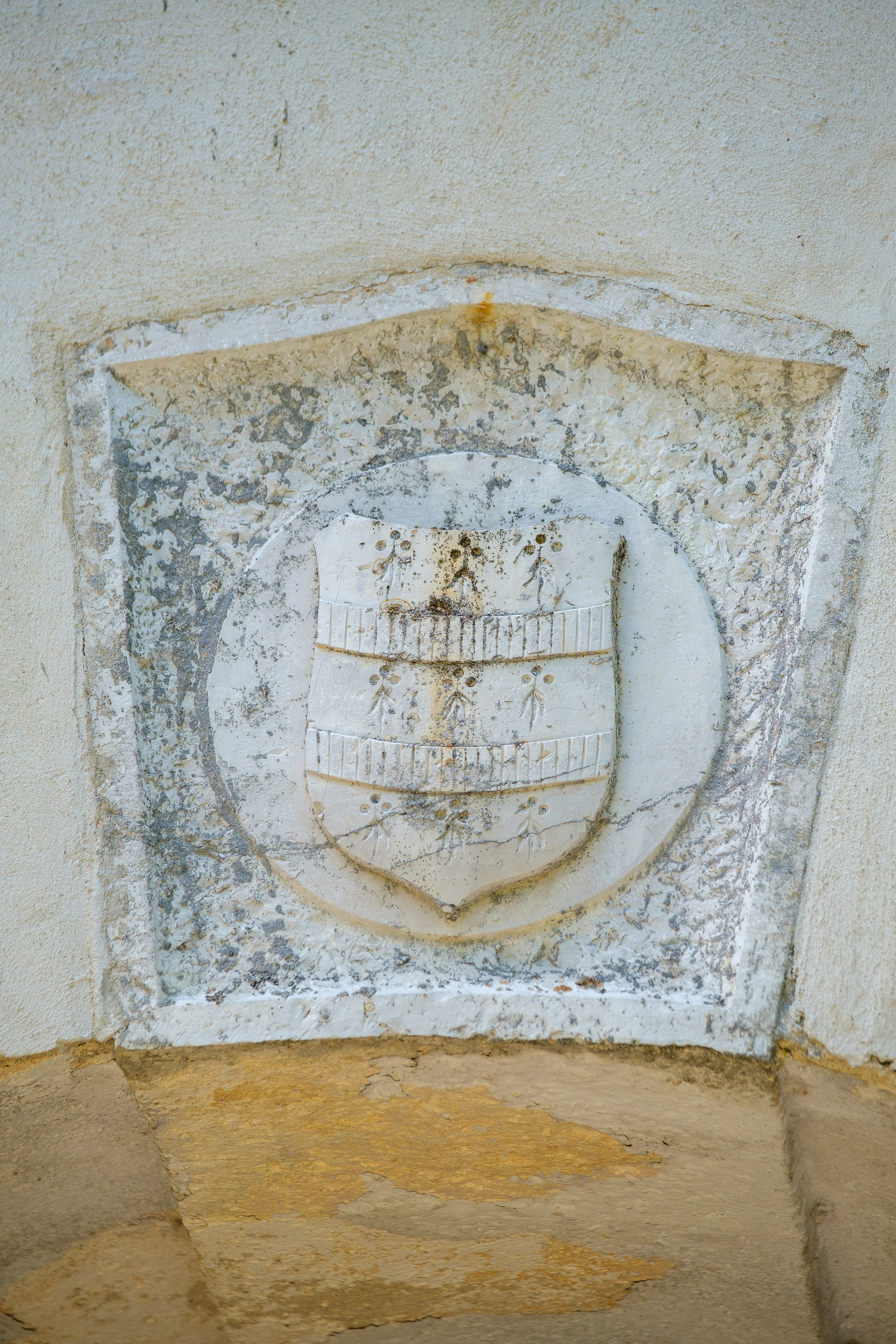
Crest

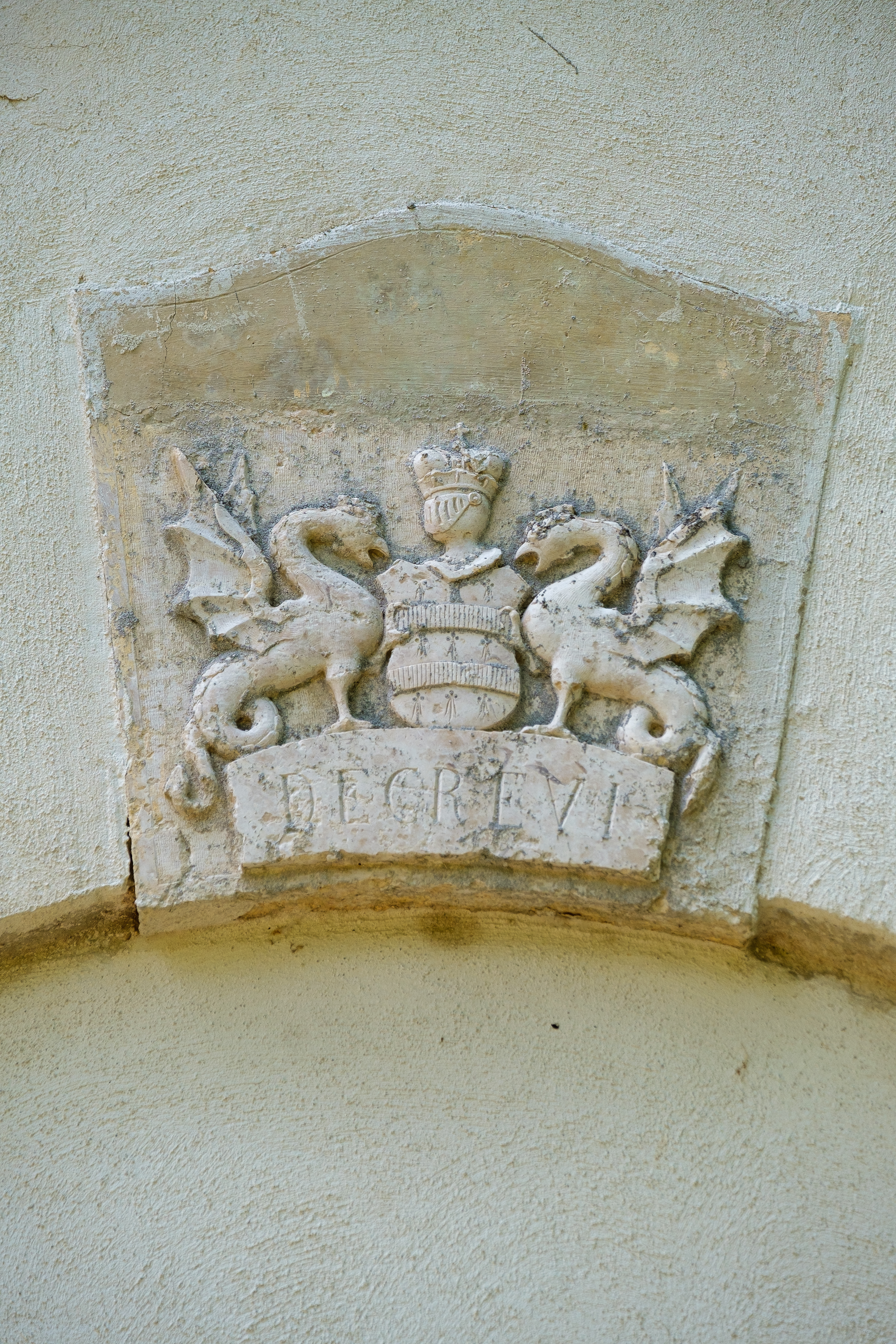
Inscription

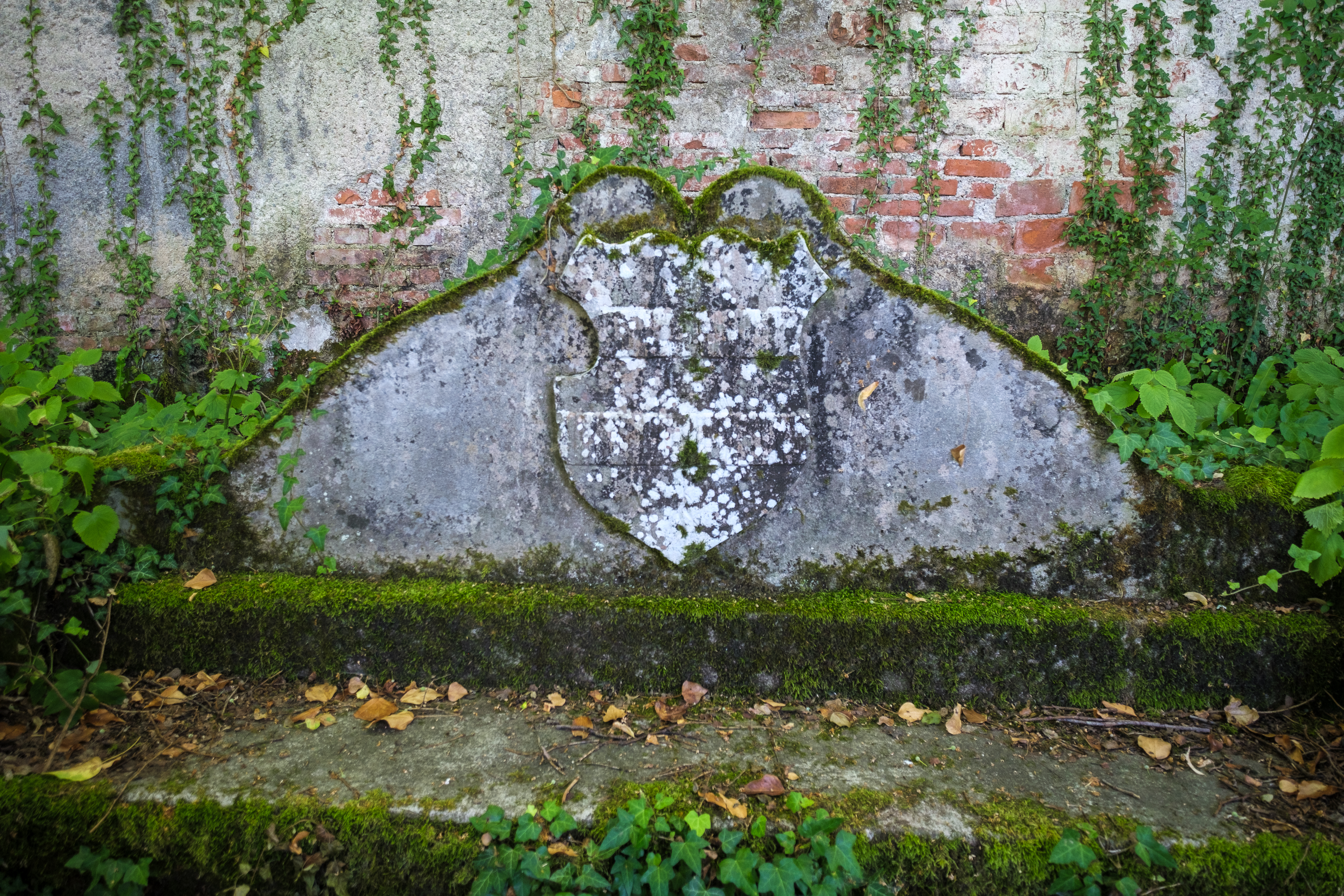
Family crest

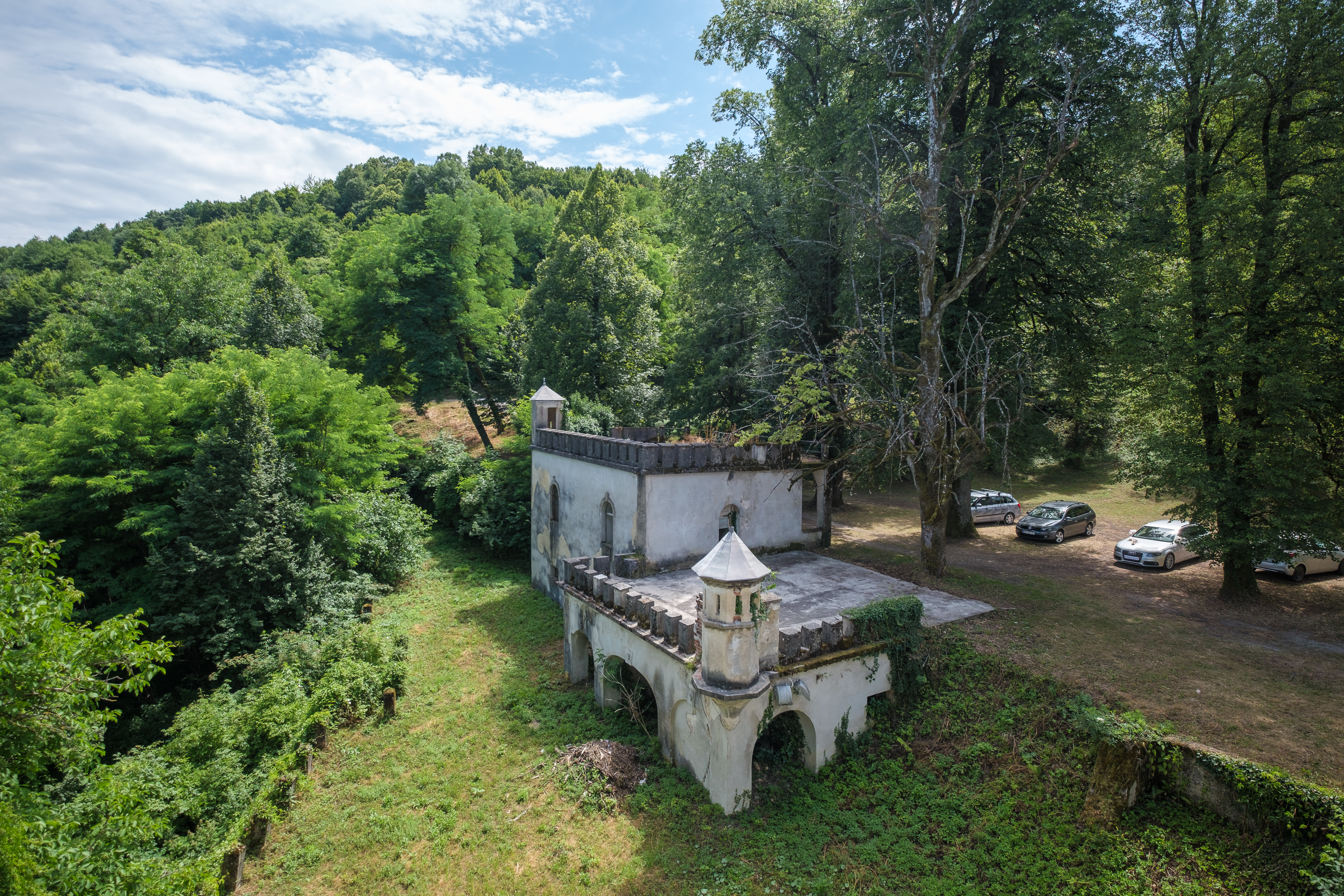
Corner

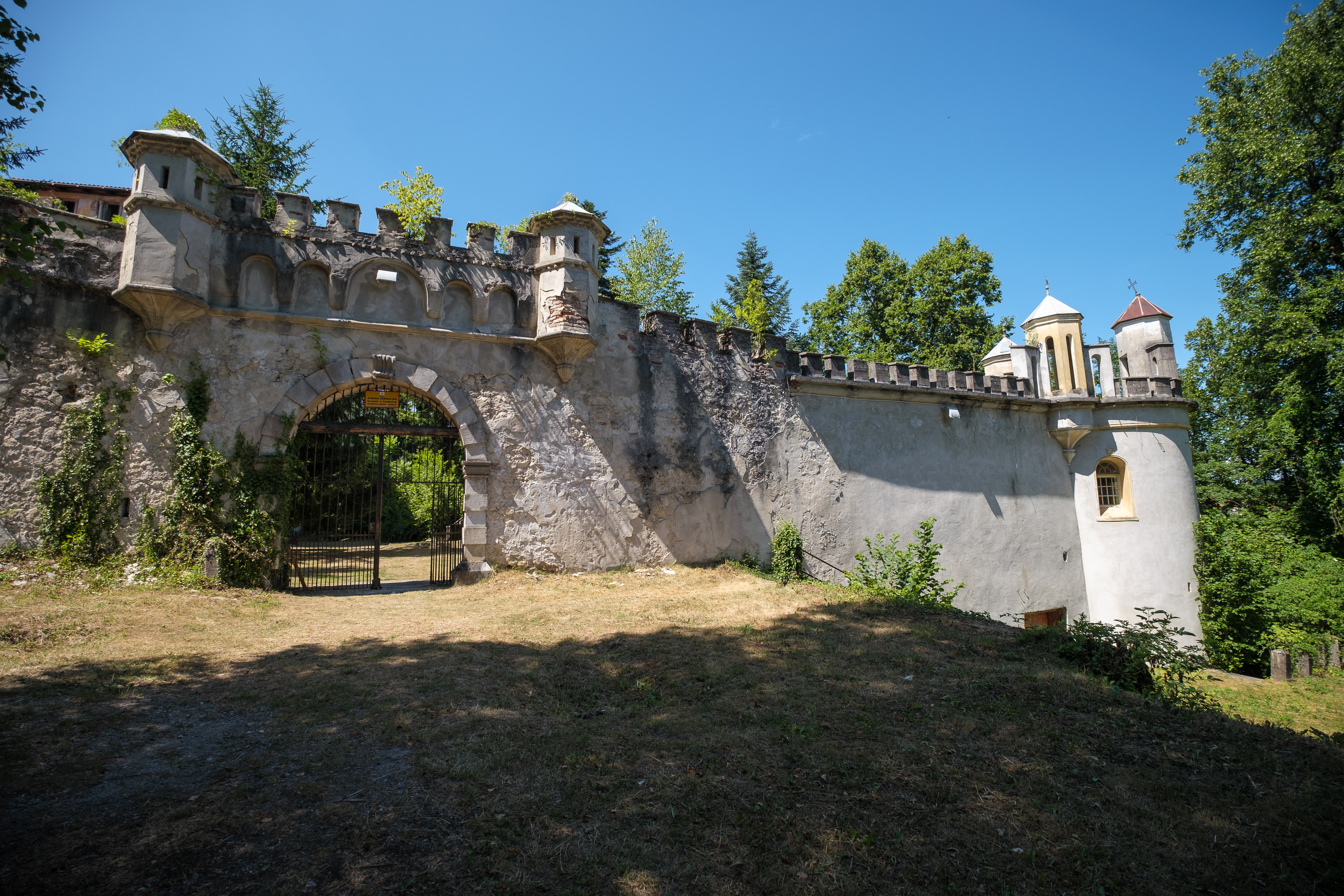
Gateway

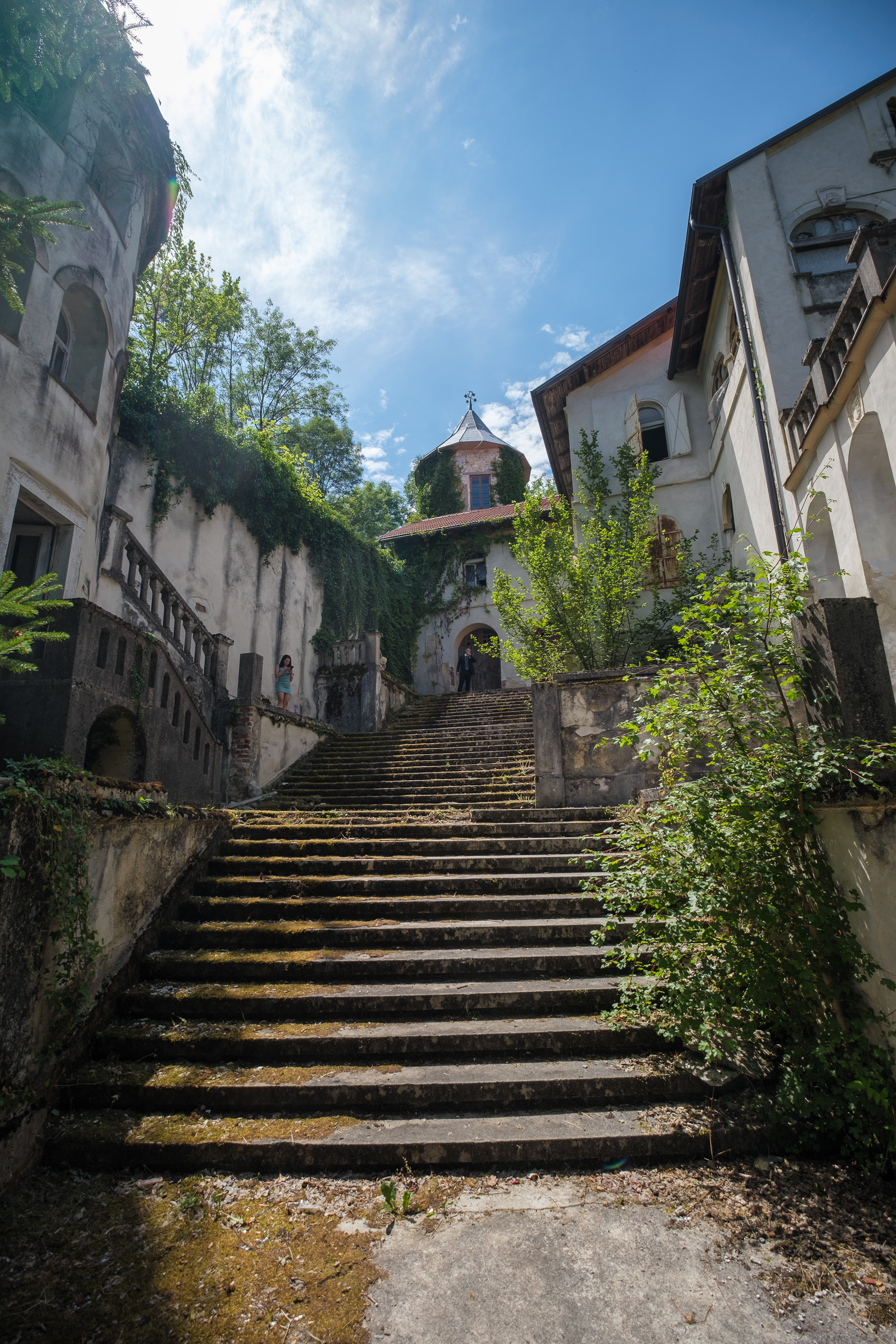
Stairway

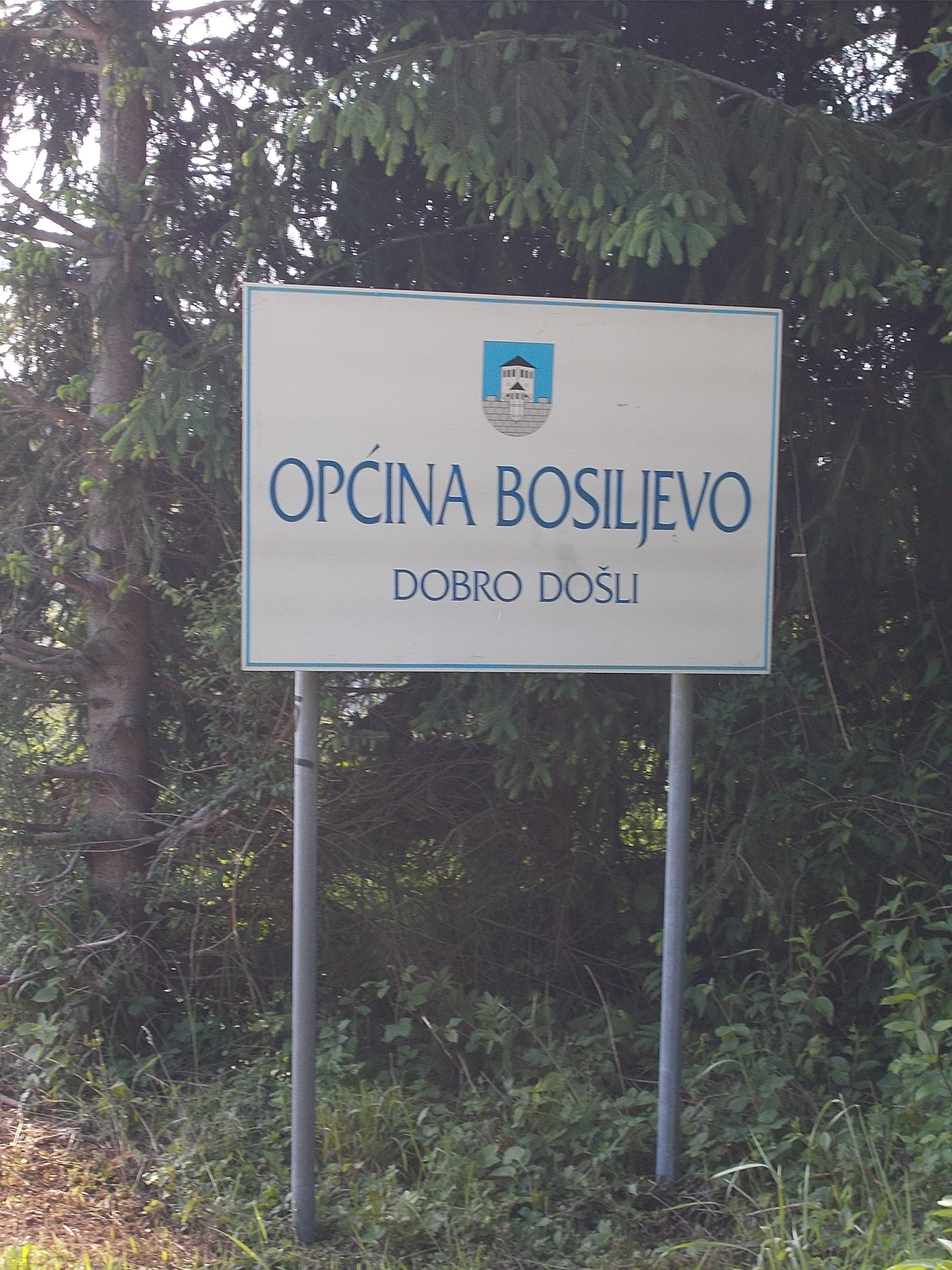
Welcome sign with Općina coat of arms

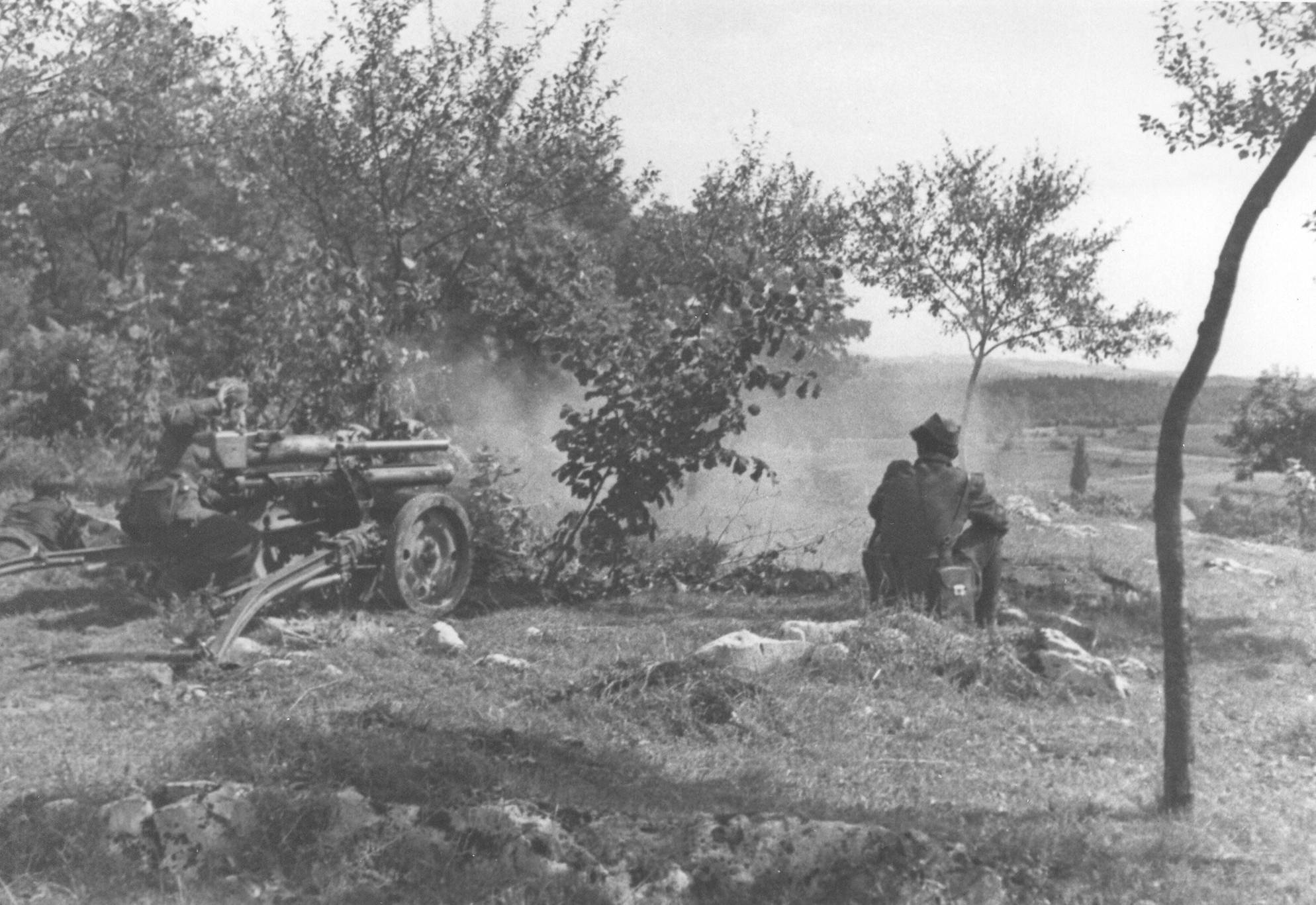
Battle for Bosiljevo (1944)

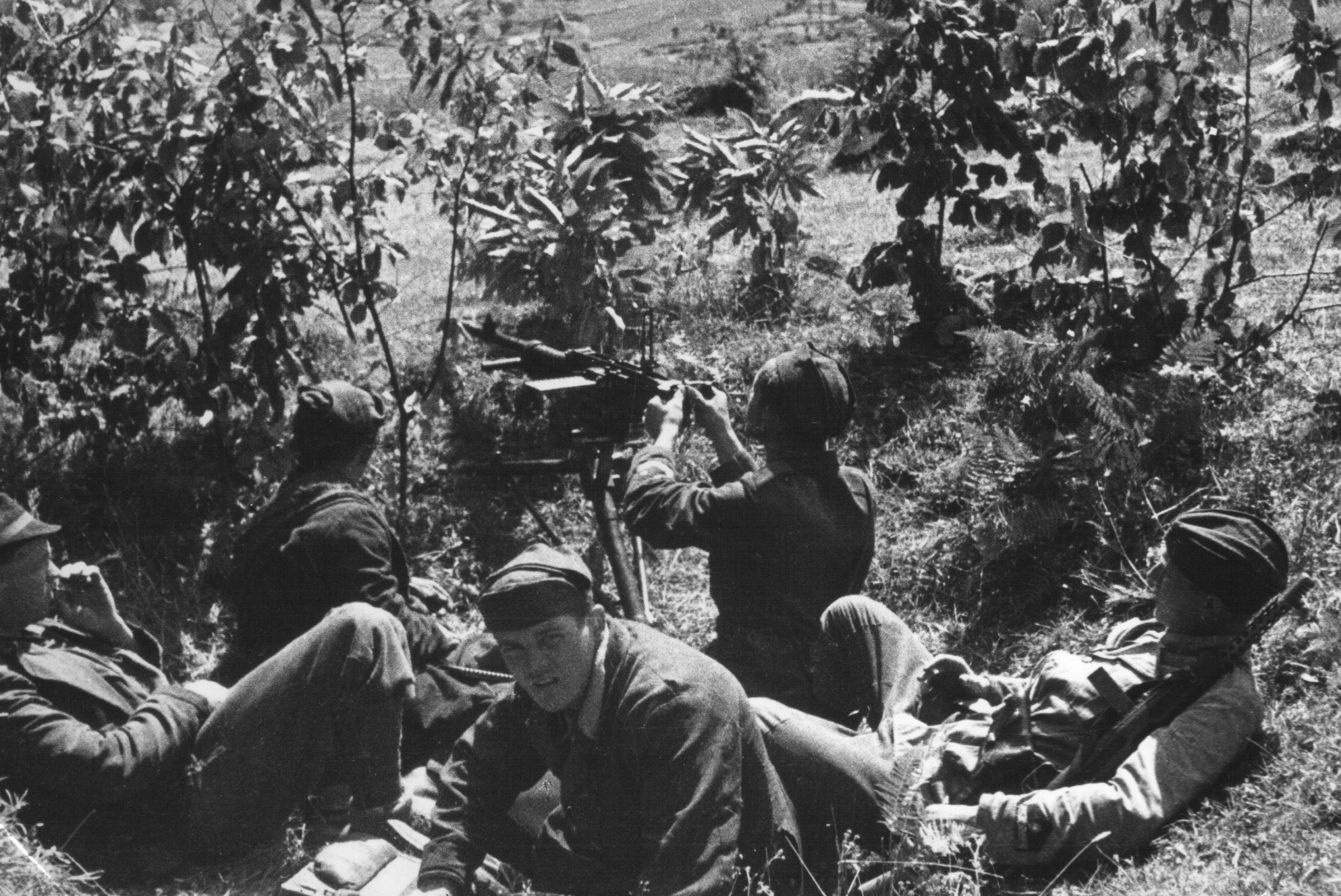
Battle for Bosiljevo (1944)

== Notable residents ==
- Ana Katarina Frankopan-Zrinska, Croatian writer
- Fran Krsto Frankopan, nobleman, part of the Zrinski-Frankopan conspiracy
- Stjepan Korenić (1856–1940), dean and writer
- Arthur Nugent (1825–1897), Austrian Oberst, Croatian Magnate and MP for Zagreb county, son of Laval
- Laval Nugent (1777–1862), Austrian FM, in Bosiljevo from 1820 till death in 1862.

== Bibliography ==
- Kočevar, Sanja (1995). "Bosiljevo; Prilog analizi kulturno-povijesnih i prirodnih vrijednosti" (PDF). Prostor (in Croatian). 3 (1(09)): 107–124.
- Trgo, Fabijan, ed. (1964). Zbornik dokumenata i podataka o Narodno-oslobodilačkom ratu Jugoslovenskih naroda. Vol. V, 32.
- Melem Hajdarović, Mihela (14 June 2023). "Glavačeva karta Hrvatske iz 1673. – njezini toponimi, geografski sadržaj i historijskogeografski kontekst" [Glavač’s map of Croatia from 1673: Its toponyms, geographical content, and historical-geographical context]. Studia lexicographica. 17 (32): 47–78. doi:10.33604/sl.17.32.2. eISSN 2459-5578.
