= Pribanjci =

Coordinates: 45°27′N 15°15′E

- Village
- Interactive map of Pribanjci
- Country: Croatia
- County: Karlovac County

Area
  - Total: 5.3 km^{2} (2.0 sq mi)

Population (2021)
  - Total: 98
  - Density: 18/km^{2} (48/sq mi)
- Time zone: UTC+1 (CET)
  - Summer (DST): UTC+2 (CEST)

Pribanjci is a village in Croatia on the border with Slovenia. It is connected by the D204 highway.

== Name ==
It was recorded as Pribanitzi on the 1673 map of Stjepan Glavač.

== History ==
In 1870, the road's stone retaining wall was repaired.

== Governance ==
It is the seat of the Local Committee of Prikuplje, encompassing Bosanci, Fratrovci, Glavica, Jančani, Johi, Kasuni, Milani, Pribanjci, Sela Bosiljevska, Spahići and Žubrinci.

== Sports ==
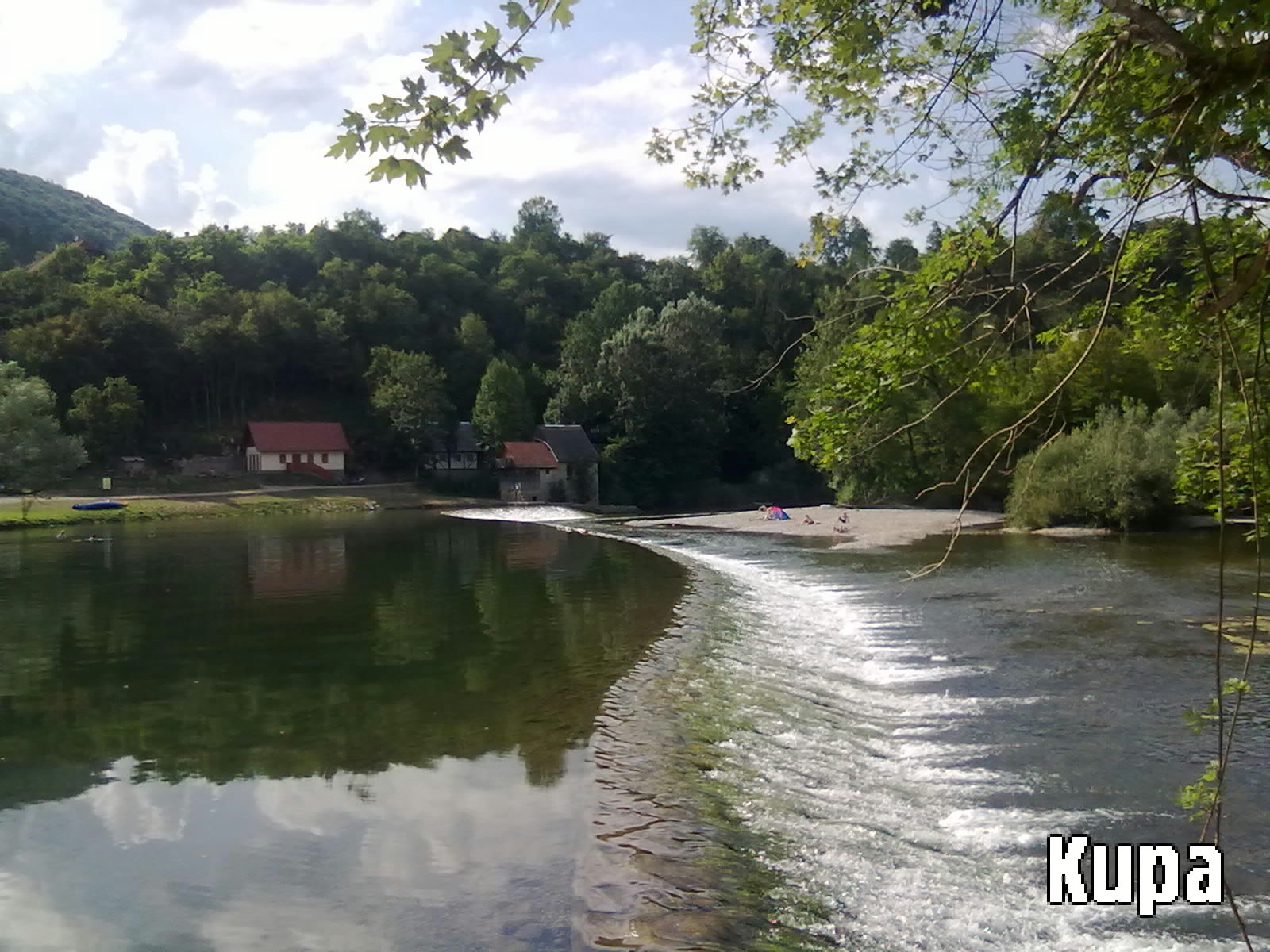
Kupa from Pribanjci

The "Gorski Kotar Bike Tour", held annually since 2012, sometimes goes through Pribanjci, such as in the first leg for 2024.

== Bibliography ==
- Melem Hajdarović, Mihela (2023-06-14). "Glavačeva karta Hrvatske iz 1673. – njezini toponimi, geografski sadržaj i historijskogeografski kontekst" [Glavač’s map of Croatia from 1673: Its toponyms, geographical content, and historical-geographical context]. Studia lexicographica. 17 (32): 47–78. doi:10.33604/sl.17.32.2. eISSN 2459-5578.
