= Grabrk =

- Village
- Interactive map of Grabrk
- Coordinates: 45.352°N 15.288°E
- Country: Croatia
- County: Karlovac County
- Municipality: Bosiljevo

Area
  - Total: 6.8 km^{2} (2.6 sq mi)

Population (2021)
  - Total: 87
  - Density: 13/km^{2} (33/sq mi)
- Time zone: UTC+1 (CET)
  - Summer (DST): UTC+2 (CEST)
- Postal code: 47250 Duga Resa
- Area code: +385 (0)47

Grabrk is a village in Croatia.

== Name ==
It was recorded as Graberg on the 1673 map of Stjepan Glavač.

== History ==
The road from Grabrk to Mateše, originally 4 metres (13 ft) wide, was expanded in 2018 to a width of 5 metres (16 ft).

== Demographics ==
Village of Grabrk: Population trends 1857–2021
v

| population | 258 | 256 | 285 | 303 | 247 | 246 | 223 | 254 | 306 | 286 | 268 | 228 | 177 | 179 | 126 | 117 | 87 |
| | 1857 | 1869 | 1880 | 1890 | 1900 | 1910 | 1921 | 1931 | 1948 | 1953 | 1961 | 1971 | 1981 | 1991 | 2001 | 2011 | 2021 |

Sources: Croatian Bureau of Statistics publications

== Politics ==
It is the seat of the Local Committee of Grabrk, encompassing itself, Dani, Malik, Mateše, Otok na Dobri, Umol, Podumol, Soline and Špehari.

== Bibliography ==
- Perković, T. (2018-11-19). "Dionica od 700 metara ceste Grabrk – Mateše obnovljena i sigurnija za promet". Radio Mrežnica (in Serbo-Croatian).
- Melem Hajdarović, Mihela (2023-06-14). "Glavačeva karta Hrvatske iz 1673. – njezini toponimi, geografski sadržaj i historijskogeografski kontekst" [Glavač’s map of Croatia from 1673: Its toponyms, geographical content, and historical-geographical context]. Studia lexicographica. 17 (32): 47–78. doi:10.33604/sl.17.32.2. eISSN 2459-5578.
