= Johi =

Johi may refer to:

- Jahi, a Zoroastrian demoness
- Johi, Dadu, a town in Sindh, Pakistan
- Johi, Croatia, a village near Bosiljevo
- Jonah Hill (born 1983), American actor
