= Umol =

Umol may refer to:

- umol (unit), μmol, micromol, a unit for amount of substance
- Umol, Croatia, a village near Bosiljevo
