= KRC =

KRC or krc may stand for:

- Kurdish Red Crescent a humanitarian non-profit responsible for aid throughout Kurdistan areas
- Kappa recognition factor or HIVEP3 protein
- Kent Recursive Calculator, a functional programming language
- Kenya Railways Corporation
- Kingston Rowing Club, on River Thames, England
- Korean Resource Center, Los Angeles, CA, US
- Sudan Khartoum Refinery Company
- Karachay-Balkar language, ISO 639-2 & -3 code
- Depati Parbo Airport IATA code
- K&R C, the original dialect of the C programming language, described in the 1978 book by Kernighan and Dennis Ritchie
- The branding of the radio station in Cincinnati, Ohio, United States whose actual call sign is WKRC.

== See also ==
- Krč
- Krč Bosiljevski
