= Spahići =

Spahići may refer to:

- Spahići, Bosnia and Herzegovina, a village near Bihać
- Spahići, Croatia, a village near Bosiljevo
