= Orišje =

- Location within Croatia
- Coordinates: 45°24′14″N 15°17′31″E
- Country: Croatia
- County: Karlovac
- Municipality: Bosiljevo

Area
  - Total: 6.8 km^{2} (2.6 sq mi)

Population (2021)
  - Total: 39
  - Density: 5.7/km^{2} (15/sq mi)
- Time zone: UTC+1 (CET)
  - Summer (DST): UTC+2 (CEST)

Orišje is one of 43 villages in the municipality of Bosiljevo, Croatia. It has a population of 50 (2011 census).

== History ==
Orišje was recorded as a settlement in the Middle Ages. After the Ottoman incursions and conquests in the first half of the 16th century, the region was largely deserted, and the population moved to the coastal area and the islands of the Šibenik archipelago. The area was repopulated in the 18th century.
