= Nikola IX Frankopan =

Croatian magnate

Nikola IX Frankopan (1584 - 15/16 April 1647) was a Croatian magnate who served as Ban of Croatia from 1617 until 1622. He was a member of the Tržac branch of the Frankopan noble family.

== Biography ==
As a son of Gašpar I Frankopan and Katarina Lenković, he was schooled in Graz, Ljubljana and Italy. During the division of his family's estates, he got Bosiljevo, Zvečaj and Novi Vinodolski. He was the cavalry captain of Krajina from 1602 to 1608, captain of Senj between 1612 and 1614. During the Uskok War, he was active in Kvarner, Istria, Furlania and Gorizia. In 1616, he was named Ban of Croatia, Dalmatia and Slavonia by king Matthias, to whom he took an oath at his court. The Croatian Sabor appointed him cavalry captain of the Kingdom, but eventually forced him to relinquish the post following accusations of excessive force use. He died on 15 or 16 April 1647 in Vienna, where his body was embalmed, to be interred in Trsat.

== Legacy ==
He granted many churches and monasteries. He was particularly inclined towards education and sent one of his serfs from Bosiljevo to be schooled in Zagreb.

=== Frangepaneum ===
According to his will, a foundation Frangepaneum was established after his death in Zagreb. It was geared to secure education towards poor students "of Illyrian or Croatian nation" for the benefit of "our people". Nikola granted this institution Starý Jičín in Moravia and a sum of 19,000 forints as indebted by the king in order to maintain it. It was to be managed by the Jesuits under the supervision of the Bishop of Zagreb. The institute later grew into an aristocratic dormitory and during the 19th century, funds for only one cadet student were available.
