= D204 road =

Road in Croatia

D204 state road

Route information
- Length: 6.3 km (3.9 mi)

Major junctions
- From: Pribanjci border crossing to Slovenia (Vinica)
- D3 in Bosanci
- To: A1 in Bosiljevo 1 interchange

Location
- Country: Croatia
- Counties: Karlovac

Highway system
- Highways in Croatia

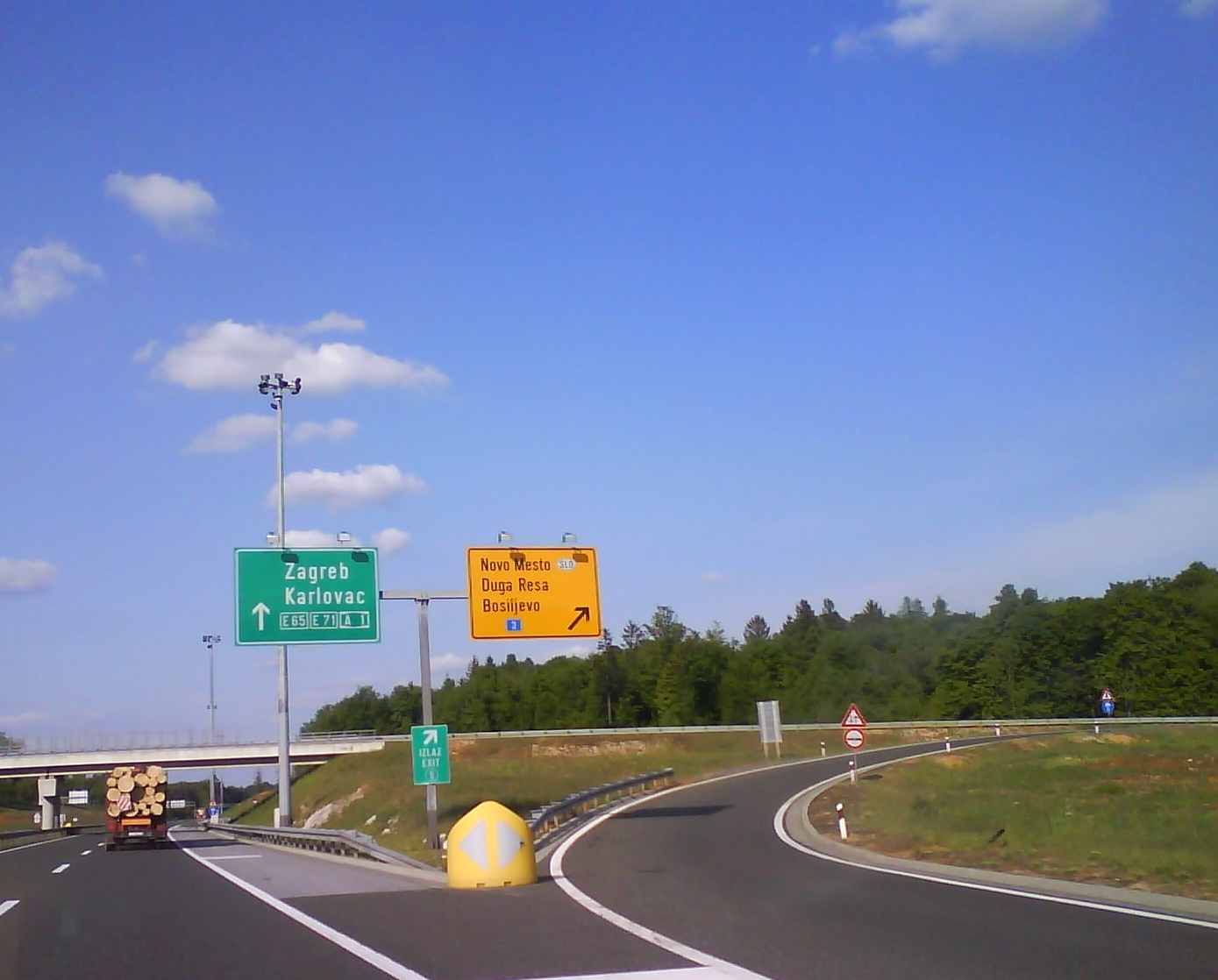
A1 motorway (northbound) exit leading to D204

D204 is a state road connecting Pribanjci and nearby border crossing to Slovenia to D3 state road in Bosanci, and the road also serves as a connecting road to the A1 motorway as it terminates in Bosiljevo 1 interchange. The northern terminus of the road is located at Aržano border crossing, providing access to Livno in Bosnia and Herzegovina. The road is 6.3 km (3.9 mi) long.

This and all other state roads in Croatia are managed and maintained by Hrvatske ceste, state owned company.

== Traffic volume ==
Traffic is regularly counted and reported by Hrvatske ceste, operator of the road. Substantial variations between annual (AADT) and summer (ASDT) traffic volumes are attributed to the fact that the road serves as an approach to the Croatian A1 motorway carrying considerable tourist traffic.

D204 traffic volume
Road	Counting site	AADT	ASDT	Notes
D204	3001 Pribanjci	862	1,600	Adjacent to D3 junction.

== Road junctions and populated areas ==
D204 junctions/populated areas
Type	Slip roads/Notes
	Pribanjci border crossing to Slovenia; Slovenian route 218 to Črnomelj, Slovenia. The northern terminus of the road.
	Pribanjci
	Kasuni
	Bosanci; D3 to Delnice (to the west) and to Duga Resa (to the east). There are two D3 junctions in the village, and D204 and D3 are concurrent for approximately 150 m (490 ft). The first D3 junction encountered by the southbound D204 traffic is to Duga Resa to the east, while the second one is to Delnice to the west.
	A1 in Bosiljevo 1 interchange reached via a short connector road. Connection to Karlovac and Zagreb (to the north) and to Zadar and Split (to the south) and to Rijeka via A6 motorway which branches off just to the west, at Bosiljevo 2 interchange. Ž3175 to Vukova Gorica and Ogulin. The southern terminus of the road.
