= Korenić Brdo =

- Village
- Interactive map of Korenić Brdo
- Coordinates: 45.409°N 15.343°E
- Country: Croatia
- County: Karlovac County

Area
  - Total: 1.4 km^{2} (0.54 sq mi)

Population (2021)
  - Total: 0
  - Density: 0.0/km^{2} (0.0/sq mi)
- Time zone: UTC+1 (CET)
  - Summer (DST): UTC+2 (CEST)

Korenić Brdo is a village in Croatia.

== Demographics ==
Village of Korenić Brdo: Population trends 1857–2021
v

population	65	66	67	54	51	43	43	42	25	33	32	19	14	5	2	2
	1857	1869	1880	1890	1900	1910	1921	1931	1948	1953	1961	1971	1981	1991	2001	2011	2021

Note:Korenić-Brdo until 1971 Sources: Croatian Bureau of Statistics publications
