= Mateše =

Mateše Mateško Selo
- Village
- Interactive map of Mateše
- Coordinates: 45.342°N 15.287°E
- Country: Croatia
- County: Karlovac County

Area
  - Total: 1.2 km^{2} (0.46 sq mi)

Population (2021)
  - Total: 55
  - Density: 46/km^{2} (120/sq mi)
- Time zone: UTC+1 (CET)
  - Summer (DST): UTC+2 (CEST)

Mateše, also known as Mateško Selo, is a village in Croatia.

== History ==
It was first mentioned as Matiševsko Selo in the Modruš Urbarium of 1486. At the time, it had 4 Morgens of land, and once paid 40 solidi but was without population at the time.

On the night of the New Year of 2007, a wolf killed the dog of Josip Mateše, a resident of the eponymous village. It was the first recorded winter attack in Bosiljevo Općina.

In October 2010, a mother and son of the Jurković family who had been at a wedding in Mateše drowned in the accumulation lake on the Donja Dobra at Otok na Dobri after their car fell in, though another son and daughter managed to extract themselves in time.

The road from Grabrk to Mateše, originally 4 metres (13 ft) wide, was expanded in 2018 to a width of 5 metres (16 ft).

== Demographics ==
Village of Mateše: Population trends 1857–2021
v

population	116	106	111	116	118	106	95	116	89	89	90	71	81	81	76	59	55
	1857	1869	1880	1890	1900	1910	1921	1931	1948	1953	1961	1971	1981	1991	2001	2011	2021

Sources: Croatian Bureau of Statistics publications

== Bibliography ==
- Podžupan (1859-07-27) [written 1859-06-14]. "Poziv". Carsko kraljevske službene narodne novine (in Serbo-Croatian). Vol. 20, no. 170. pp. 433–434. ISSN 1333-5243.
- Lopašić, Radoslav (1894). "Urbar Modruški od g. 1486" [The Modruš Urbarium of the Year 1486]. Hrvatski urbari. Monumenta historico-iuridica Slavorum meridionalium (in Croatian). Vol. 5, 1. pp. 20–81.
  - Republished: Lopašić, Radoslav (1997). Abramović, Ignacije (ed.). Urbar modruški [The Modruš Urbarium] (in Croatian). Ogulin: Ogranak Matice hrvatske. ISBN 953-96393-4-4. Tirage: 500.
- RM (2007-01-05). "U Mateškom Selu vuk ubio psa na lancu". Radio Mrežnica (in Serbo-Croatian).
- RM (2010-10-10). "Majka i sin se utopili u jezeru HE Lešće". Radio Mrežnica (in Serbo-Croatian).
- ZL (2010-10-10). "Smrt u jezeru zbog neoznačene ceste". Zadarski list (in Serbo-Croatian).
- Perković, T. (2018-11-19). "Dionica od 700 metara ceste Grabrk – Mateše obnovljena i sigurnija za promet". Radio Mrežnica (in Serbo-Croatian).
