= Potok Bosiljevski =

- Village
- Interactive map of Potok Bosiljevski
- Coordinates: 45.422°N 15.310°E
- Country: Croatia
- County: Karlovac County

Area
  - Total: 1 km^{2} (0.39 sq mi)

Population (2021)
  - Total: 0
  - Density: 0.0/km^{2} (0.0/sq mi)
- Time zone: UTC+1 (CET)
  - Summer (DST): UTC+2 (CEST)

Potok Bosiljevski is a village in Croatia.

== Demographics ==
Village of Potok Bosiljevski: Population trends 1857–2021
v

population	146	139	127	121	95	70	78	68	51	44	33	25	16	27	6	5
	1857	1869	1880	1890	1900	1910	1921	1931	1948	1953	1961	1971	1981	1991	2001	2011	2021

Note:Potok until 1910. Sources: Croatian Bureau of Statistics publications

== Bibliography ==
- Podžupan (1859-07-27) [written 1859-06-14]. "Poziv". Carsko kraljevske službene narodne novine (in Serbo-Croatian). Vol. 20, no. 170. pp. 433–434. ISSN 1333-5243.
