= Dugače =

Dugače Dugaće
- Village
- Interactive map of Dugače
- Coordinates: 45.429°N 15.310°E
- Country: Croatia
- County: Karlovac County

Area
  - Total: 3.3 km^{2} (1.3 sq mi)

Population (2021)
  - Total: 17
  - Density: 5.2/km^{2} (13/sq mi)
- Time zone: UTC+1 (CET)
  - Summer (DST): UTC+2 (CEST)

Dugače is a village in Croatia.

== Demographics ==
Village of Dugače: Population trends 1857–2021
v

population	210	185	179	179	173	146	155	156	128	108	110	68	50	71	22	14	17
	1857	1869	1880	1890	1900	1910	1921	1931	1948	1953	1961	1971	1981	1991	2001	2011	2021

Sources: Croatian Bureau of Statistics publications

== Bibliography ==
- Martinković (1854-04-10) [written 1854-03-14]. "Poziv od strane ureda c. kr. podžupani karlovačke nižepodpisani vojnoj dužnosti podvèrženi momci". Carsko kraljevske službene narodne novine (in Serbo-Croatian). Vol. 20, no. 82. p. 217. ISSN 1333-5243.
- Podžupan (1859-07-27) [written 1859-06-14]. "Poziv". Carsko kraljevske službene narodne novine (in Serbo-Croatian). Vol. 20, no. 170. pp. 433–434. ISSN 1333-5243.
