= Vodena Draga =

- Village
- Interactive map of Vodena Draga
- Coordinates: 45.426°N 15.372°E
- Country: Croatia
- County: Karlovac County

Area
  - Total: 5.6 km^{2} (2.2 sq mi)

Population (2021)
  - Total: 27
  - Density: 4.8/km^{2} (12/sq mi)
- Time zone: UTC+1 (CET)
  - Summer (DST): UTC+2 (CEST)

Vodena Draga is a village in Croatia.

== Demographics ==
Village of Vodena Draga: Population trends 1857–2021
v

population	240	221	208	203	203	215	204	208	240	245	196	178	118	134	46	37	27
	1857	1869	1880	1890	1900	1910	1921	1931	1948	1953	1961	1971	1981	1991	2001	2011	2021

Sources: Croatian Bureau of Statistics publications

According to the 2011 census, the population of Vodena Draga was 37 people.

== Politics ==
It is the seat of its own local committee.

== Bibliography ==
- Podžupan (1859-07-27) [written 1859-06-14]. "Poziv". Carsko kraljevske službene narodne novine (in Serbo-Croatian). Vol. 20, no. 170. pp. 433–434. ISSN 1333-5243.
