= Skoblić Brdo =

- Village
- Interactive map of Skoblić Brdo
- Coordinates: 45.414°N 15.300°E
- Country: Croatia
- County: Karlovac County

Area
  - Total: 1.5 km^{2} (0.58 sq mi)

Population (2021)
  - Total: 1
  - Density: 0.67/km^{2} (1.7/sq mi)
- Time zone: UTC+1 (CET)
  - Summer (DST): UTC+2 (CEST)

Skoblić Brdo is a village in Croatia.

== Demographics ==
Village of Skoblić Brdo: Population trends 1857–2021
v

population	112	107	94	76	64			61	39	37	37	29	22	21	8	2	1
	1857	1869	1880	1890	1900	1910	1921	1931	1948	1953	1961	1971	1981	1991	2001	2011	2021

Note:Skoblić-Brdo until 1971. Under Bosiljevo in 1910 and 1921. Sources: Croatian Bureau of Statistics publications
