= Fučkovac =

- Village
- Interactive map of Fučkovac
- Coordinates: 45.412°N 15.294°E
- Country: Croatia
- County: Karlovac County

Area
  - Total: 0.4 km^{2} (0.15 sq mi)

Population (2021)
  - Total: 28
  - Density: 70/km^{2} (180/sq mi)
- Time zone: UTC+1 (CET)
  - Summer (DST): UTC+2 (CEST)

Fučkovac is a village in Croatia.

== Demographics ==
Village of Fučkovac: Population trends 1857–2021
v

population	99	89	88	98	97			81	50	51	46	40	36	40	19	23	28
	1857	1869	1880	1890	1900	1910	1921	1931	1948	1953	1961	1971	1981	1991	2001	2011	2021

Note:Under Bosiljevo in 1910 and 1921. Sources: Croatian Bureau of Statistics publications
