= Fratrovci =

- Village
- Interactive map of Fratrovci
- Coordinates: 45.437°N 15.232°E
- Country: Croatia
- County: Karlovac County
- Municipality: Bosiljevo

Area
  - Total: 4.4 km^{2} (1.7 sq mi)

Population (2021)
  - Total: 29
  - Density: 6.6/km^{2} (17/sq mi)
- Time zone: UTC+1 (CET)
  - Summer (DST): UTC+2 (CEST)
- Postal code: 47250 Duga Resa
- Area code: +385 (0)47

Fratrovci is a village in Croatia.

== History ==
On 18 July 2023, the wind of a thunderstorm left Fratrovci without power.

== Demographics ==
In 1828/1830, there were 160 residents in 19 families, all Catholic.

Village of Fratrovci: Population trends 1857–2021
v

population	166	156	158	141	111	96	84	110	115	126	108	84	64	68	47	31	29
	1857	1869	1880	1890	1900	1910	1921	1931	1948	1953	1961	1971	1981	1991	2001	2011	2021

Sources: Croatian Bureau of Statistics publications

== Sports ==
The "Gorski Kotar Bike Tour", held annually since 2012, sometimes goes through Fratrovci, such as in the first leg for 2024.

== Bibliography ==
- Martinković (1854-04-10) [written 1854-03-14]. "Poziv od strane ureda c. kr. podžupani karlovačke nižepodpisani vojnoj dužnosti podvèrženi momci". Carsko kraljevske službene narodne novine (in Serbo-Croatian). Vol. 20, no. 82. p. 217. ISSN 1333-5243.
- Podžupan (1859-07-27) [written 1859-06-14]. "Poziv". Carsko kraljevske službene narodne novine (in Serbo-Croatian). Vol. 20, no. 170. pp. 433–434. ISSN 1333-5243.
