= Bitorajci =

- Village
- Interactive map of Bitorajci
- Coordinates: 45.412°N 15.298°E
- Country: Croatia
- County: Karlovac County

Area
  - Total: 0.4 km^{2} (0.15 sq mi)

Population (2021)
  - Total: 10
  - Density: 25/km^{2} (65/sq mi)
- Time zone: UTC+1 (CET)
  - Summer (DST): UTC+2 (CEST)

Bitorajci is a village in Croatia.

== Demographics ==
Village of Bitorajci: Population trends 1857–2021
v

population	22	26	30	50	15			24	25	31	32	20	22	23	11	16	10
	1857	1869	1880	1890	1900	1910	1921	1931	1948	1953	1961	1971	1981	1991	2001	2011	2021

Note:Under Bosiljevo in 1910 and 1921. Sources: Croatian Bureau of Statistics publications
