= Rendulići =

- Village
- Interactive map of Rendulići
- Coordinates: 45.391°N 15.283°E
- Country: Croatia
- County: Karlovac County

Area
  - Total: 5.9 km^{2} (2.3 sq mi)

Population (2021)
  - Total: 10
  - Density: 1.7/km^{2} (4.4/sq mi)
- Time zone: UTC+1 (CET)
  - Summer (DST): UTC+2 (CEST)

Rendulići is a village in Croatia.

== Demographics ==
Village of Rendulići: Population trends 1857–2021
v

population	76	51	63	58	44	47	40	47	40	43	40	35	29	23	17	10	10
	1857	1869	1880	1890	1900	1910	1921	1931	1948	1953	1961	1971	1981	1991	2001	2011	2021

Sources: Croatian Bureau of Statistics publications
