= Resnik Bosiljevski =

- Village
- Interactive map of Resnik Bosiljevski
- Coordinates: 45.418°N 15.287°E
- Country: Croatia
- County: Karlovac County

Area
  - Total: 3.1 km^{2} (1.2 sq mi)

Population (2021)
  - Total: 15
  - Density: 4.8/km^{2} (13/sq mi)
- Time zone: UTC+1 (CET)
  - Summer (DST): UTC+2 (CEST)

Resnik Bosiljevski is a village in Croatia.

== Demographics ==
Village of Resnik Bosiljevski: Population trends 1857–2021
v

population	77	89	92	89	95			63	54	47	45	42	32	40	17	16	15
	1857	1869	1880	1890	1900	1910	1921	1931	1948	1953	1961	1971	1981	1991	2001	2011	2021

Note:Resnik until 1900. Under Bosiljevo in 1910 and 1921. Sources: Croatian Bureau of Statistics publications
