= Beč, Croatia =

Beč Beć
- Village
- Interactive map of Beč
- Coordinates: 45.420°N 15.348°E
- Country: Croatia
- County: Karlovac County

Area
  - Total: 2.3 km^{2} (0.89 sq mi)

Population (2021)
  - Total: 7
  - Density: 3.0/km^{2} (7.9/sq mi)
- Time zone: UTC+1 (CET)
  - Summer (DST): UTC+2 (CEST)

Beč is a village in Croatia.

== Demographics ==
Village of Beč: Population trends 1857–2021
v

population	88	105	106	98	92	84	51	46	55	47	38	21	17	16	6	9	7
	1857	1869	1880	1890	1900	1910	1921	1931	1948	1953	1961	1971	1981	1991	2001	2011	2021

Sources: Croatian Bureau of Statistics publications
