= Novo Selo Bosiljevsko =

- Village
- Interactive map of Novo Selo Bosiljevsko
- Coordinates: 45.401°N 15.304°E
- Country: Croatia
- County: Karlovac County

Area
  - Total: 2.5 km^{2} (0.97 sq mi)

Population (2021)
  - Total: 15
  - Density: 6.0/km^{2} (16/sq mi)
- Time zone: UTC+1 (CET)
  - Summer (DST): UTC+2 (CEST)

Novo Selo Bosiljevsko is a village in Croatia.

== Demographics ==
Village of Novo Selo Bosiljevsko: Population trends 1857–2021
v

population	155	153	167	147	144	363	340	114	122	126	115	87	66	69	36	25	15
	1857	1869	1880	1890	1900	1910	1921	1931	1948	1953	1961	1971	1981	1991	2001	2011	2021

Note:Novo Selo until 1900. Includes Orišje in 1910 and 1921. Do 1900. iskazivano pod imenom Novo Selo. U 1910. i 1921. sadrži podatke za naselje Orišje. Sources: Croatian Bureau of Statistics publications
