= Podrebar =

- Village
- Interactive map of Podrebar
- Coordinates: 45.398°N 15.287°E
- Country: Croatia
- County: Karlovac County

Area
  - Total: 3.5 km^{2} (1.4 sq mi)

Population (2021)
  - Total: 13
  - Density: 3.7/km^{2} (9.6/sq mi)
- Time zone: UTC+1 (CET)
  - Summer (DST): UTC+2 (CEST)

Podrebar is a village in Croatia.

== Demographics ==
Village of Podrebar: Population trends 1857–2021
v

population	223	215	239	222	163	157	121	143	135	138	116	87	53	44	24	18	13
	1857	1869	1880	1890	1900	1910	1921	1931	1948	1953	1961	1971	1981	1991	2001	2011	2021

Sources: Croatian Bureau of Statistics publications

== Bibliography ==
- Martinković (1854-04-10) [written 1854-03-14]. "Poziv od strane ureda c. kr. podžupani karlovačke nižepodpisani vojnoj dužnosti podvèrženi momci". Carsko kraljevske službene narodne novine (in Serbo-Croatian). Vol. 20, no. 82. p. 217. ISSN 1333-5243.
- Podžupan (1859-07-27) [written 1859-06-14]. "Poziv". Carsko kraljevske službene narodne novine (in Serbo-Croatian). Vol. 20, no. 170. pp. 433–434. ISSN 1333-5243.
