= Arthur Nugent =

Scottish footballer

Personal information
- Full name: Arthur Nugent
- Date of birth: 30 May 1926
- Place of birth: Glasgow, Scotland
- Date of death: 6 October 1995 (aged 69)
- Place of death: Glasgow, Scotland
- Position: Full back

Senior career*
Years	Team	Apps	(Gls)
–	Arthurlie		
1953–1955	Albion Rovers	31	(0)
1955–1956	Canterbury City		
1956–1957	Darlington	5	(0)
–	Poole Town		
- * Club domestic league appearances and goals

Arthur Nugent (30 May 1926 – 6 October 1995) was a Scottish footballer who played as a full back in the Scottish League for Albion Rovers, in the English Football League for Darlington, in Scottish Junior football for Arthurlie, and in English non-league football for Canterbury City and Poole Town.
