= Kraljevo Selo =

- Village
- Interactive map of Kraljevo Selo
- Coordinates: 45.413°N 15.332°E
- Country: Croatia
- County: Karlovac County

Area
  - Total: 3.1 km^{2} (1.2 sq mi)

Population (2021)
  - Total: 1
  - Density: 0.32/km^{2} (0.84/sq mi)
- Time zone: UTC+1 (CET)
  - Summer (DST): UTC+2 (CEST)

Kraljevo Selo is a village in Croatia.

== Demographics ==
Village of Kraljevo Selo: Population trends 1857–2021
v

population	49	57	44	40	39	46	38	43	44	50	44	21	11	41	4	2	1
	1857	1869	1880	1890	1900	1910	1921	1931	1948	1953	1961	1971	1981	1991	2001	2011	2021

Note:Kraljevo until 1900. Sources: Croatian Bureau of Statistics publications

== Bibliography ==
- Martinković (1854-04-10) [written 1854-03-14]. "Poziv od strane ureda c. kr. podžupani karlovačke nižepodpisani vojnoj dužnosti podvèrženi momci". Carsko kraljevske službene narodne novine (in Serbo-Croatian). Vol. 20, no. 82. p. 217. ISSN 1333-5243.
- Podžupan (1859-07-27) [written 1859-06-14]. "Poziv". Carsko kraljevske službene narodne novine (in Serbo-Croatian). Vol. 20, no. 170. pp. 433–434. ISSN 1333-5243.
