= Varoš Bosiljevski =

- Village
- Interactive map of Varoš Bosiljevski
- Coordinates: 45.412°N 15.281°E
- Country: Croatia
- County: Karlovac County

Area
  - Total: 2.8 km^{2} (1.1 sq mi)

Population (2021)
  - Total: 15
  - Density: 5.4/km^{2} (14/sq mi)
- Time zone: UTC+1 (CET)
  - Summer (DST): UTC+2 (CEST)

Varoš Bosiljevski is a village in Croatia.

== Demographics ==
Village of Varoš Bosiljevski: Population trends 1857–2001
v

population	163	155	161	172	159			149	144	210	208	114	79	93	39
	1857	1869	1880	1890	1900	1910	1921	1931	1948	1953	1961	1971	1981	1991	2001

Note:Varoš until 1900, then Varoš Bosiljevska from 1910 to 1991. In 1857 it includes part of the population of Bosiljevo. In 1910 and 1921 it is included within Bosiljevo. Sources: Croatian Bureau of Statistics publications

== Bibliography ==
- Martinković (1854-04-10) [written 1854-03-14]. "Poziv od strane ureda c. kr. podžupani karlovačke nižepodpisani vojnoj dužnosti podvèrženi momci". Carsko kraljevske službene narodne novine (in Serbo-Croatian). Vol. 20, no. 82. p. 217. ISSN 1333-5243.
- Podžupan (1859-07-27) [written 1859-06-14]. "Poziv". Carsko kraljevske službene narodne novine (in Serbo-Croatian). Vol. 20, no. 170. pp. 433–434. ISSN 1333-5243.
