= Hrsina =

- Village
- Interactive map of Hrsina
- Coordinates: 45.406°N 15.268°E
- Country: Croatia
- County: Karlovac County

Area
  - Total: 5.1 km^{2} (2.0 sq mi)

Population (2021)
  - Total: 29
  - Density: 5.7/km^{2} (15/sq mi)
- Time zone: UTC+1 (CET)
  - Summer (DST): UTC+2 (CEST)

Hrsina is a village in Croatia.

== Demographics ==
Village of Hrsina: Population trends 1857–2021
v

population	359	336	359	352	271	239	219	193	187	186	176	166	92	107	51	41	29
	1857	1869	1880	1890	1900	1910	1921	1931	1948	1953	1961	1971	1981	1991	2001	2011	2021

Sources: Croatian Bureau of Statistics publications

== Bibliography ==
- Martinković (1854-04-10) [written 1854-03-14]. "Poziv od strane ureda c. kr. podžupani karlovačke nižepodpisani vojnoj dužnosti podvèrženi momci". Carsko kraljevske službene narodne novine (in Serbo-Croatian). Vol. 20, no. 82. p. 217. ISSN 1333-5243.
- Podžupan (1859-07-27) [written 1859-06-14]. "Poziv". Carsko kraljevske službene narodne novine (in Serbo-Croatian). Vol. 20, no. 170. pp. 433–434. ISSN 1333-5243.
