= Lisičina Gorica =

- Village
- Interactive map of Lisičina Gorica
- Coordinates: 45.413°N 15.347°E
- Country: Croatia
- County: Karlovac County

Area
  - Total: 2.9 km^{2} (1.1 sq mi)

Population (2021)
  - Total: 3
  - Density: 1.0/km^{2} (2.7/sq mi)
- Time zone: UTC+1 (CET)
  - Summer (DST): UTC+2 (CEST)

Lisičina Gorica is a village in Croatia.

== Demographics ==
Village of Lisičina Gorica: Population trends 1857–2021
v

population	106	111	91	72	73	66	47	51	60	48	37	43	18	23	8	5	3
	1857	1869	1880	1890	1900	1910	1921	1931	1948	1953	1961	1971	1981	1991	2001	2011	2021

Sources: Croatian Bureau of Statistics publications

== Bibliography ==
- Martinković (1854-04-10) [written 1854-03-14]. "Poziv od strane ureda c. kr. podžupani karlovačke nižepodpisani vojnoj dužnosti podvèrženi momci". Carsko kraljevske službene narodne novine (in Serbo-Croatian). Vol. 20, no. 82. p. 217. ISSN 1333-5243.
- Podžupan (1859-07-27) [written 1859-06-14]. "Poziv". Carsko kraljevske službene narodne novine (in Serbo-Croatian). Vol. 20, no. 170. pp. 433–434. ISSN 1333-5243.
