= Lipošćaki =

- Village
- Interactive map of Lipošćaki
- Coordinates: 45.398°N 15.280°E
- Country: Croatia
- County: Karlovac County

Area
  - Total: 0.7 km^{2} (0.27 sq mi)

Population (2021)
  - Total: 8
  - Density: 11/km^{2} (30/sq mi)
- Time zone: UTC+1 (CET)
  - Summer (DST): UTC+2 (CEST)

Lipošćaki is a village in Croatia.

== Demographics ==
Village of Lipovšćaki: Population trends 1857–2001
v

population	158	139	143	124	105	84	81	87	88	81	69	55	48	38	27
	1857	1869	1880	1890	1900	1910	1921	1931	1948	1953	1961	1971	1981	1991	2001

Sources: Croatian Bureau of Statistics publications

== See also ==
- Lipošćak affair

== Bibliography ==
- Podžupan (1859-07-27) [written 1859-06-14]. "Poziv". Carsko kraljevske službene narodne novine (in Serbo-Croatian). Vol. 20, no. 170. pp. 433–434. ISSN 1333-5243.
