= Strgari =

- Village
- Interactive map of Strgari
- Coordinates: 45.399°N 15.269°E
- Country: Croatia
- County: Karlovac County

Area
  - Total: 5 km^{2} (1.9 sq mi)

Population (2021)
  - Total: 11
  - Density: 2.2/km^{2} (5.7/sq mi)
- Time zone: UTC+1 (CET)
  - Summer (DST): UTC+2 (CEST)

Strgari is a village in Croatia.

== Demographics ==
Village of Strgari: Population trends 1857–2021
v

population	104	101	103	107	96	76	91	93	97	104	84	72	43	58	26	14	11
	1857	1869	1880	1890	1900	1910	1921	1931	1948	1953	1961	1971	1981	1991	2001	2011	2021

Sources: Croatian Bureau of Statistics publications
