= Laslavići =

- Village
- Interactive map of Laslavići
- Coordinates: 45.420°N 15.339°E
- Country: Croatia
- County: Karlovac County

Area
  - Total: 1.1 km^{2} (0.42 sq mi)

Population (2021)
  - Total: 2
  - Density: 1.8/km^{2} (4.7/sq mi)
- Time zone: UTC+1 (CET)
  - Summer (DST): UTC+2 (CEST)

Laslavići is a village in Croatia.

== Demographics ==
Village of Laslavići: Population trends 1857–2021
v

| population | 95 | 112 | 110 | 105 | 83 | 90 | 91 | 91 | 70 | 60 | 61 | 27 | 17 | 22 | 4 | 1 | 2 |
| | 1857 | 1869 | 1880 | 1890 | 1900 | 1910 | 1921 | 1931 | 1948 | 1953 | 1961 | 1971 | 1981 | 1991 | 2001 | 2011 | 2021 |

Sources: Croatian Bureau of Statistics publications
