= Špehari =

- Village
- Interactive map of Špehari
- Coordinates: 45.372°N 15.311°E
- Country: Croatia
- County: Karlovac County

Area
  - Total: 1.3 km^{2} (0.50 sq mi)

Population (2021)
  - Total: 1
  - Density: 0.77/km^{2} (2.0/sq mi)
- Time zone: UTC+1 (CET)
  - Summer (DST): UTC+2 (CEST)

Špehari is a village in Croatia.

== Demographics ==
Village of Špehari: Population trends 1857–2021
v

population	49	50	55	56	54			35	45	40	31	28	14	17	6	1	1
	1857	1869	1880	1890	1900	1910	1921	1931	1948	1953	1961	1971	1981	1991	2001	2011	2021

Note:Included within Umol in 1910 and 1921. Sources: Croatian Bureau of Statistics publications
