= Soline, Bosiljevo =

Soline
- Village
- Interactive map of Soline
- Coordinates: 45.359°N 15.309°E
- Country: Croatia
- County: Karlovac County

Area
  - Total: 0.4 km^{2} (0.15 sq mi)

Population (2021)
  - Total: 31
  - Density: 78/km^{2} (200/sq mi)
- Time zone: UTC+1 (CET)
  - Summer (DST): UTC+2 (CEST)

Soline is a village in Croatia.

== Demographics ==
Village of Soline: Population trends 1857–2021
v

| population | 83 | 104 | 106 | 108 | 93 | 91 | 75 | 81 | 95 | 89 | 88 | 77 | 67 | 75 | 44 | 38 | 31 |
| | 1857 | 1869 | 1880 | 1890 | 1900 | 1910 | 1921 | 1931 | 1948 | 1953 | 1961 | 1971 | 1981 | 1991 | 2001 | 2011 | 2021 |

Sources: Croatian Bureau of Statistics publications
