= Jančani =

- Village
- Interactive map of Jančani
- Coordinates: 45.460°N 15.268°E
- Country: Croatia
- County: Karlovac County

Area
  - Total: 1.6 km^{2} (0.62 sq mi)

Population (2021)
  - Total: 24
  - Density: 15/km^{2} (39/sq mi)
- Time zone: UTC+1 (CET)
  - Summer (DST): UTC+2 (CEST)

Jančani is a village in Croatia.

== Demographics ==
Village of Jančani: Population trends 1857–2021
v

population	67	68	76	67	61	62	69	65	67	62	47	37	32	34	36	26	24
	1857	1869	1880	1890	1900	1910	1921	1931	1948	1953	1961	1971	1981	1991	2001	2011	2021

Sources: Croatian Bureau of Statistics publications

== Bibliography ==
- Martinković (1854-04-10) [written 1854-03-14]. "Poziv od strane ureda c. kr. podžupani karlovačke nižepodpisani vojnoj dužnosti podvèrženi momci". Carsko kraljevske službene narodne novine (in Serbo-Croatian). Vol. 20, no. 82. p. 217. ISSN 1333-5243.
- Podžupan (1859-07-27) [written 1859-06-14]. "Poziv". Carsko kraljevske službene narodne novine (in Serbo-Croatian). Vol. 20, no. 170. pp. 433–434. ISSN 1333-5243.
