= Dani, Karlovac County =

Dani
- Village
- Interactive map of Dani
- Coordinates: 45.355°N 15.327°E
- Country: Croatia
- County: Karlovac County

Area
  - Total: 3.4 km^{2} (1.3 sq mi)

Population (2021)
  - Total: 1
  - Density: 0.29/km^{2} (0.76/sq mi)
- Time zone: UTC+1 (CET)
  - Summer (DST): UTC+2 (CEST)

Dani is a village in Croatia.

== Demographics ==
Village of Dani: Population trends 1857–2021
v

population	44	66	47	34	31	35	43	53	52	26	18	20	17	17	9	8	1
	1857	1869	1880	1890	1900	1910	1921	1931	1948	1953	1961	1971	1981	1991	2001	2011	2021

Sources: Croatian Bureau of Statistics publications
