= Podumol =

- Village
- Interactive map of Podumol
- Coordinates: 45.358°N 15.302°E
- Country: Croatia
- County: Karlovac County

Area
  - Total: 1 km^{2} (0.39 sq mi)

Population (2021)
  - Total: 24
  - Density: 24/km^{2} (62/sq mi)
- Time zone: UTC+1 (CET)
  - Summer (DST): UTC+2 (CEST)

Podumol is a village in Croatia.

== Demographics ==
Village of Podumol: Population trends 1857–2021
v

population	119	121	106	117	86	92	95	102	134	120	93	75	50	65	36	30	24
	1857	1869	1880	1890	1900	1910	1921	1931	1948	1953	1961	1971	1981	1991	2001	2011	2021

Sources: Croatian Bureau of Statistics publications

== Bibliography ==
- Podžupan (1859-07-27) [written 1859-06-14]. "Poziv". Carsko kraljevske službene narodne novine (in Serbo-Croatian). Vol. 20, no. 170. pp. 433–434. ISSN 1333-5243.
