= Milani, Croatia =

Milani
- Village
- Interactive map of Milani
- Coordinates: 45.456°N 15.296°E
- Country: Croatia
- County: Karlovac County

Area
  - Total: 1.4 km^{2} (0.54 sq mi)

Population (2021)
  - Total: 15
  - Density: 11/km^{2} (28/sq mi)
- Time zone: UTC+1 (CET)
  - Summer (DST): UTC+2 (CEST)

Milani is a village in Croatia.

== Demographics ==
Village of Milani: Population trends 1857–2021
v

population	121	99	109	86	73	65	54	69	73	65	43	34	32	35	19	10	15
	1857	1869	1880	1890	1900	1910	1921	1931	1948	1953	1961	1971	1981	1991	2001	2011	2021

Sources: Croatian Bureau of Statistics publications

== Bibliography ==
- Martinković (1854-04-10) [written 1854-03-14]. "Poziv od strane ureda c. kr. podžupani karlovačke nižepodpisani vojnoj dužnosti podvèrženi momci". Carsko kraljevske službene narodne novine (in Serbo-Croatian). Vol. 20, no. 82. p. 217. ISSN 1333-5243.
- Podžupan (1859-07-27) [written 1859-06-14]. "Poziv". Carsko kraljevske službene narodne novine (in Serbo-Croatian). Vol. 20, no. 170. pp. 433–434. ISSN 1333-5243.
