= Krč Bosiljevski =

- Village
- Interactive map of Krč Bosiljevski
- Coordinates: 45.405°N 15.276°E
- Country: Croatia
- County: Karlovac County

Area
  - Total: 0.9 km^{2} (0.35 sq mi)

Population (2021)
  - Total: 22
  - Density: 24/km^{2} (63/sq mi)
- Time zone: UTC+1 (CET)
  - Summer (DST): UTC+2 (CEST)

Krč Bosiljevski is a village in Croatia.

== Demographics ==
Village of Krč Bosiljevski: Population trends 1857–2021
v

population	190	170	166	157	153	121	96	110	103	101	93	67	51	44	28	27	22
	1857	1869	1880	1890	1900	1910	1921	1931	1948	1953	1961	1971	1981	1991	2001	2011	2021

Note:Krč until 1900. Sources: Croatian Bureau of Statistics publications

== Bibliography ==
- Martinković (1854-04-10) [written 1854-03-14]. "Poziv od strane ureda c. kr. podžupani karlovačke nižepodpisani vojnoj dužnosti podvèrženi momci". Carsko kraljevske službene narodne novine (in Serbo-Croatian). Vol. 20, no. 82. p. 217. ISSN 1333-5243.
- Podžupan (1859-07-27) [written 1859-06-14]. "Poziv". Carsko kraljevske službene narodne novine (in Serbo-Croatian). Vol. 20, no. 170. pp. 433–434. ISSN 1333-5243.
