= Otok na Dobri =

- Village
- Interactive map of Otok na Dobri
- Coordinates: 45.330°N 15.281°E
- Country: Croatia
- County: Karlovac County

Area
  - Total: 8.2 km^{2} (3.2 sq mi)

Population (2021)
  - Total: 49
  - Density: 6.0/km^{2} (15/sq mi)
- Time zone: UTC+1 (CET)
  - Summer (DST): UTC+2 (CEST)

Otok na Dobri is a village in Croatia.

== Name ==
Otok was recorded as Ottok on the 1673 map of Stjepan Glavač.

== History ==
In October 2010, a mother and son of the Jurković family who had been at a wedding in Mateše drowned in the accumulation lake on the Donja Dobra at Otok na Dobri after their car fell in, though another son and daughter managed to extract themselves in time.

== Demographics ==
Village of Otok na Dobri: Population trends 1857–2021
v

population	253	222	205	213	172	184	159	199	221	220	205	171	134	116	67	60	49
	1857	1869	1880	1890	1900	1910	1921	1931	1948	1953	1961	1971	1981	1991	2001	2011	2021

Note:Otok until 1900. Sources: Croatian Bureau of Statistics publications

== Bibliography ==
- Samardžija, Marko (2003). "Promjene imena hrvatskih naseljenih mjesta od mjeseca travnja do kraja godine 1941". Folia onomastica Croatica (in Serbo-Croatian) (12–13). Zagreb: Filozofski fakultet Sveučilišta u Zagrebu: 425–432.
- RM (2010-10-10). "Majka i sin se utopili u jezeru HE Lešće". Radio Mrežnica (in Serbo-Croatian).
- ZL (2010-10-10). "Smrt u jezeru zbog neoznačene ceste". Zadarski list (in Serbo-Croatian).
- Melem Hajdarović, Mihela (2023-06-14). "Glavačeva karta Hrvatske iz 1673. – njezini toponimi, geografski sadržaj i historijskogeografski kontekst" [Glavač’s map of Croatia from 1673: Its toponyms, geographical content, and historical-geographical context]. Studia lexicographica. 17 (32): 47–78. doi:10.33604/sl.17.32.2. eISSN 2459-5578.
