= Malik, Croatia =

Malik
- Village
- Interactive map of Malik
- Coordinates: 45.341°N 15.271°E
- Country: Croatia
- County: Karlovac County

Area
  - Total: 1.6 km^{2} (0.62 sq mi)

Population (2021)
  - Total: 18
  - Density: 11/km^{2} (29/sq mi)
- Time zone: UTC+1 (CET)
  - Summer (DST): UTC+2 (CEST)

Malik is a village in Croatia.

== Demographics ==
Village of Malik: Population trends 1857–2021
v

population	111	111	116	133	107	111	98	108	132	110	107	90	72	71	35	24	18
	1857	1869	1880	1890	1900	1910	1921	1931	1948	1953	1961	1971	1981	1991	2001	2011	2021

Sources: Croatian Bureau of Statistics publications
