= Glavica, Karlovac County =

Glavica
- Village
- Interactive map of Glavica
- Coordinates: 45.450°N 15.315°E
- Country: Croatia
- County: Karlovac County

Area
  - Total: 2.2 km^{2} (0.85 sq mi)

Population (2021)
  - Total: 35
  - Density: 16/km^{2} (41/sq mi)
- Time zone: UTC+1 (CET)
  - Summer (DST): UTC+2 (CEST)

Glavica is a village in Croatia.

== Demographics ==
Village of Glavica: Population trends 1857–2021
v

population	250	223	252	223	172	149	125	136	101	98	66	60	42	35	27	34	35
	1857	1869	1880	1890	1900	1910	1921	1931	1948	1953	1961	1971	1981	1991	2001	2011	2021

Sources: Croatian Bureau of Statistics publications

== Bibliography ==
- Martinković (1854-04-10) [written 1854-03-14]. "Poziv od strane ureda c. kr. podžupani karlovačke nižepodpisani vojnoj dužnosti podvèrženi momci". Carsko kraljevske službene narodne novine (in Serbo-Croatian). Vol. 20, no. 82. p. 217. ISSN 1333-5243.
- Podžupan (1859-07-27) [written 1859-06-14]. "Poziv". Carsko kraljevske službene narodne novine (in Serbo-Croatian). Vol. 20, no. 170. pp. 433–434. ISSN 1333-5243.
