= Žubrinci =

- Village
- Interactive map of Žubrinci
- Coordinates: 45.461°N 15.281°E
- Country: Croatia
- County: Karlovac County

Area
  - Total: 1.2 km^{2} (0.46 sq mi)

Population (2021)
  - Total: 27
  - Density: 22/km^{2} (58/sq mi)
- Time zone: UTC+1 (CET)
  - Summer (DST): UTC+2 (CEST)

Žubrinci is a village in Croatia.

== Demographics ==
Village of Žubrinci: Population trends 1857–2021
v

population	79	82	86	84	60	59	50	59	71	69	60	49	45	38	26	31	27
	1857	1869	1880	1890	1900	1910	1921	1931	1948	1953	1961	1971	1981	1991	2001	2011	2021

Sources: Croatian Bureau of Statistics publications

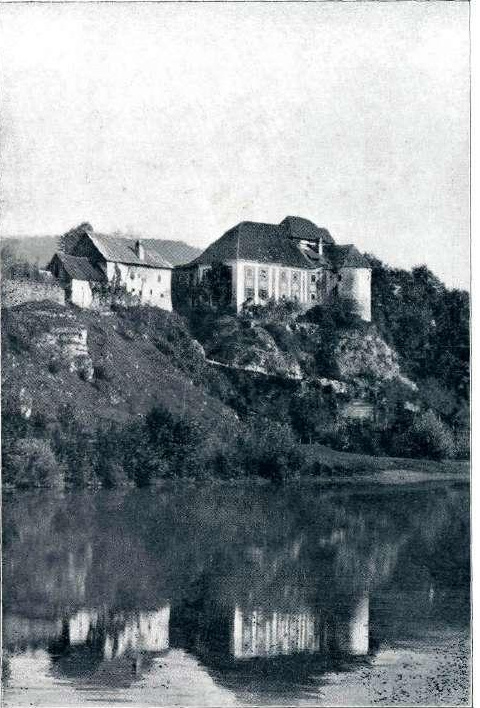
Vinica castle from Žubrinci
