= Sela Bosiljevska =

- Village
- Interactive map of Sela Bosiljevska
- Coordinates: 45.456°N 15.261°E
- Country: Croatia
- County: Karlovac County

Area
  - Total: 1.8 km^{2} (0.69 sq mi)

Population (2021)
  - Total: 60
  - Density: 33/km^{2} (86/sq mi)
- Time zone: UTC+1 (CET)
  - Summer (DST): UTC+2 (CEST)

Sela Bosiljevska is a village in Croatia.

== Demographics ==
Village of Sela Bosiljevska: Population trends 1857–2021
v

population	119	130	138	125	93	84	94	102	107	104	75	78	80	84	75	69	60
	1857	1869	1880	1890	1900	1910	1921	1931	1948	1953	1961	1971	1981	1991	2001	2011	2021

Note:Sela until 1900. Hrčić in 1910 and 1921. Sources: Croatian Bureau of Statistics publications

== Bibliography ==
- Podžupan (1859-07-27) [written 1859-06-14]. "Poziv". Carsko kraljevske službene narodne novine (in Serbo-Croatian). Vol. 20, no. 170. pp. 433–434. ISSN 1333-5243.
