= Umol, Croatia =

Settlement in Karlovac County, Croatia

Umol
- Settlement
- Interactive map of Umol
- Location of Umol in Croatia
- Coordinates: 45°21′54″N 15°18′07″E
- Country: Croatia
- County: Karlovac County
- Municipality: Bosiljevo

Area
  - Total: 1.3 km^{2} (0.50 sq mi)

Population (2021)
  - Total: 28
  - Density: 22/km^{2} (56/sq mi)
- Time zone: UTC+1 (CET)
  - Summer (DST): UTC+2 (CEST)
- Postal code: 47250 Duga Resa
- Area code: +385 (0)47

Umol is a settlement in the Municipality of Bosiljevo in Croatia. In 2021, its population was 28.

== Demographics ==
Umol: Population trends 1857–2021
v

population	124	109	118	102	86	132	117	90	109	110	87	78	60	85	37	37	28
	1857	1869	1880	1890	1900	1910	1921	1931	1948	1953	1961	1971	1981	1991	2001	2011	2021

Sources: Croatian Bureau of Statistics publications

== Bibliography ==
- Martinković (1854-04-10) [written 1854-03-14]. "Poziv od strane ureda c. kr. podžupani karlovačke nižepodpisani vojnoj dužnosti podvèrženi momci". Carsko kraljevske službene narodne novine (in Serbo-Croatian). Vol. 20, no. 82. p. 217. ISSN 1333-5243.
- Podžupan (1859-07-27) [written 1859-06-14]. "Poziv". Carsko kraljevske službene narodne novine (in Serbo-Croatian). Vol. 20, no. 170. pp. 433–434. ISSN 1333-5243.
