= Spahići, Croatia =

Spahići
- Village
- Interactive map of Spahići
- Coordinates: 45.463°N 15.273°E
- Country: Croatia
- County: Karlovac County

Area
  - Total: 2.1 km^{2} (0.81 sq mi)

Population (2021)
  - Total: 23
  - Density: 11/km^{2} (28/sq mi)
- Time zone: UTC+1 (CET)
  - Summer (DST): UTC+2 (CEST)

Spahići is a village in Croatia.

== Demographics ==
Village of Spahići: Population trends 1857–2021
v

population	91	87	92	80	74	82	74	75	71	72	57	51	45	63	36	32	23
	1857	1869	1880	1890	1900	1910	1921	1931	1948	1953	1961	1971	1981	1991	2001	2011	2021

Sources: Croatian Bureau of Statistics publications

== Bibliography ==
- Podžupan (1859-07-27) [written 1859-06-14]. "Poziv". Carsko kraljevske službene narodne novine (in Serbo-Croatian). Vol. 20, no. 170. pp. 433–434. ISSN 1333-5243.
