= Johi, Croatia =

Johi
- Village
- Interactive map of Johi
- Coordinates: 45.454°N 15.305°E
- Country: Croatia
- County: Karlovac County

Area
  - Total: 1.8 km^{2} (0.69 sq mi)

Population (2021)
  - Total: 19
  - Density: 11/km^{2} (27/sq mi)
- Time zone: UTC+1 (CET)
  - Summer (DST): UTC+2 (CEST)

Johi is a village in Croatia.

== Demographics ==
Village of Johi: Population trends 1857–2021
v

population	133	136	151	144	135	122	93	106	94	85	60	44	34	36	28	33	19
	1857	1869	1880	1890	1900	1910	1921	1931	1948	1953	1961	1971	1981	1991	2001	2011	2021

Sources: Croatian Bureau of Statistics publications
