= List of tunnels in Croatia =

This list of tunnels in Croatia includes any road, rail or waterway tunnel (hydrotechnical or water transfer tunnel) in Croatia.

- Ćićarija Tunnel (construction announced), 13 - 15 km
- Velika Kapela Tunnel (construction announced), cca 14 km
- Hydrotechnical tunnel Gusić polje−Hrmotine, 13574 m
- Hydrotechnical tunnel at HE Orlovac, 12100 m
- Hydrotechnical tunnel between rivers Lika and Gacka, 10500 m
- Hydrotechnical tunnel at HE Vinodol, cca 10500 m
- Hydrotechnical tunnel at HE Zakučac, 9894/9876 m
- Hydrotechnical tunnel at HE Gojak, 9386 m, ⌀ = 4.5 m
- Hydrotechnical tunnel Gornja Švica–Marasi, 9216 m
- Hydrotechnical tunnel at RHE Velebit, 8200 m, ⌀ = 4.5 m
- Mala Kapela Tunnel, 5821/5780 m, A1 motorway
- Sveti Rok Tunnel, 5679 m, A1 motorway
- Učka Tunnel, 5630 or 5634/5062 m, A8 motorway
- Sveti Ilija Tunnel, 4248 m, D532 or DC532 state road (D76)
- Hydrotechnical tunnel between lakes Lokvarka and Bajer, 3456.5 m
- Hydrotechnical tunnel at HE Rijeka, 3290 m, ⌀ = 3.2 m
- Bibinje Tunnel (under construction), cca 3000 m, M606 railway
- Hydrotechnical tunnel Srđ, 2994 m, ⌀ ≈ 1.7-2.25 m
- Hydrotechnical tunnel at RHE Velebit, 2825 m, ⌀ = 3 m
- Hydrotechnical tunnel Čiovo, 2824 m
- unnamed (construction announced), cca 2800 m, railway Međunarodna zračna luka Zagreb "Franjo Tuđman" – Stari terminal – Međunarodna zračna luka Zagreb "Franjo Tuđman" – Novi terminal
- Stupe hydrotechnical tunnel, 2512 m
- Debeli brijeg Tunnel, 2467 m, D674
- Plasina Tunnel, 2300 m, A1 motorway
- Sinac Tunnel, 2273.6 m, M604 railway
- Tuhobić Tunnel, 2143 or 2141 m, A6 motorway
- Hydrotechnical tunnel Konavosko polje, cca 1970 m
- Golubinka Tunnel, 1895 or 1900 m, A1 motorway
- Split Tunnel, 1893 m, M604 railway
- Brajdica Tunnel (aka Sušak Tunnel, Sušak–Pećine Tunnel), 1873 or 1838 m, M603, the only spiral railway tunnel in Croatia
- Sveta Tri Kralja Tunnel, 1741 m, A2
- Hydrotechnical tunnel at HE Miljacka, 1620 m, h = 3 m
- unnamed; under construction, 1600 m, A3? (Požega – Staro Petrovo Selo road)
- Hydrotechnical tunnel at HE Orlovac, 1577 m
- Brinje Tunnel, 1560 m, A1 motorway
- Selca-Dubovica Tunnel, 1516 m, DC116 or D116
- Omiš Tunnel, 1472 m, Ž6166
- Javorova Kosa Tunnel, 1460 m, A6 motorway
- Pitve-Zavala Tunnel, 1400 m, LC67190 or L67190 local road, previously hydrotechnical tunnel Pitve
- Supava Tunnel, 1290 m, D8
- Konjsko Tunnel, 1262/1122 m, A1 motorway
- Pećine Tunnel, 1258.5 or 1341 or 1342 m, D404
- Podmurvice Tunnel, 1253 m, D403
- Debeljak Tunnel, 1250 or 1326 m, M606 railway
- Polakovica Tunnel, 1242 m, D8
- Kupjak Tunnel, 1222.8 m, M202 railway
- Grič Tunnel, 1231 m, A1 motorway
- unnamed hydrotechnical tunnel in Novalja, 1200 m
- Veliki Gložac Tunnel, 1130 m, A6 motorway
- Mali Prolog Tunnel, 1029 m, D425
- Šubir Tunnel, 962 m, A1
- Dujmovača Tunnel (aka Dujmovac Tunnel), 888 m, M604 railway
- Dubrave Tunnel, 868 m, A1
- Vršek Tunnel, 868 m, A6
- Marjan Tunnel, 840 m, Ž6139
- Trsat Tunnel, 830 m, A7
- Podvugleš Tunnel, 610 m, A6 motorway
- Vrata Tunnel, 260 m, A6 motorway

== See also ==
- List of tunnels by location
