= Hreljin Viaduct =

Bridge in Croatia

- Coordinates: 45.32842°N 14.616323°E
- Carries: A6 motorway
- Locale: Primorje-Gorski Kotar County, Croatia
- Official name: Viadukt Hreljin
- Maintained by: Autocesta Rijeka–Zagreb

Characteristics
- Design: Box girder bridge
- Total length: 544.85 m
- Width: 13.15 + 13.67 m
- Longest span: 49.05 m
- Clearance below: 42 m

History
- Opened: 1995

Statistics
- Toll: Charged as a part of A6 motorway toll

Location
- Interactive map of Hreljin Viaduct

Hreljin Vidauct is located between the Vrata and Oštrovica interchanges of the A6 motorway in Primorje-Gorski Kotar County, Croatia, just to the west of Tuhobić Tunnel. It is 544.85 metres (1,787.6 ft) long. The viaduct consists of two parallel structures: The first one was completed in 1995 by Hidroelektra, and the second one in 2008 by Konstruktor. The viaduct is tolled within the A6 motorway ticket system and there are no separate toll plazas associated with use of the viaduct. The viaduct was designed by Hidroelektra.

== Structure description ==
At this location, the motorway route follows a horizontal curve of 700-metre (2,300 ft) radius. Transversal grade of the deck is constant and equal to 6%, while elevation grade of the viaduct is constant at 3.3%, sloping towards Oštrovica interchange. The viaduct is a box girder structure supporting the superstructure across 11 spans: 41.7 m (137 ft) + 9 x 49.05 m (160.9 ft) + 41.7 m (137 ft).

The two parallel structures were executed using different construction methods: The original superstructure, built by Hidroelektra, was executed in 2.35-metre (7 ft 9 in) prefabricated concrete elements glued together with an epoxy resin. The newer structure, built by Konstruktor, was built using incremental launching and, unlike the first superstructure, starts from the side closer to Vrata. This method was preferred since the construction method applied during the construction of the original structure proved cumbersome. Viaduct piers comprise a 5-metre (16 ft) by 3.2-metre (10 ft) box cross-section.

== Traffic volume ==
Traffic is regularly counted and reported by Autocesta Rijeka–Zagreb, operator of the viaduct and the A6 motorway where the structure is located, and published by Hrvatske ceste. Substantial variations between annual (AADT) and summer (ASDT) traffic volumes are attributed to the fact that the bridge carries substantial tourist traffic to the Adriatic resorts. The traffic count is performed using analysis of motorway toll ticket sales.

Hreljin Viaduct traffic volume
Road	Counting site	AADT	ASDT	Notes
A6	2915 Vrata west	12,413	20,891	Between Vrata and Oštrovica interchanges.

== See also ==
- List of bridges by length
