= Zečeve Drage Viaduct =

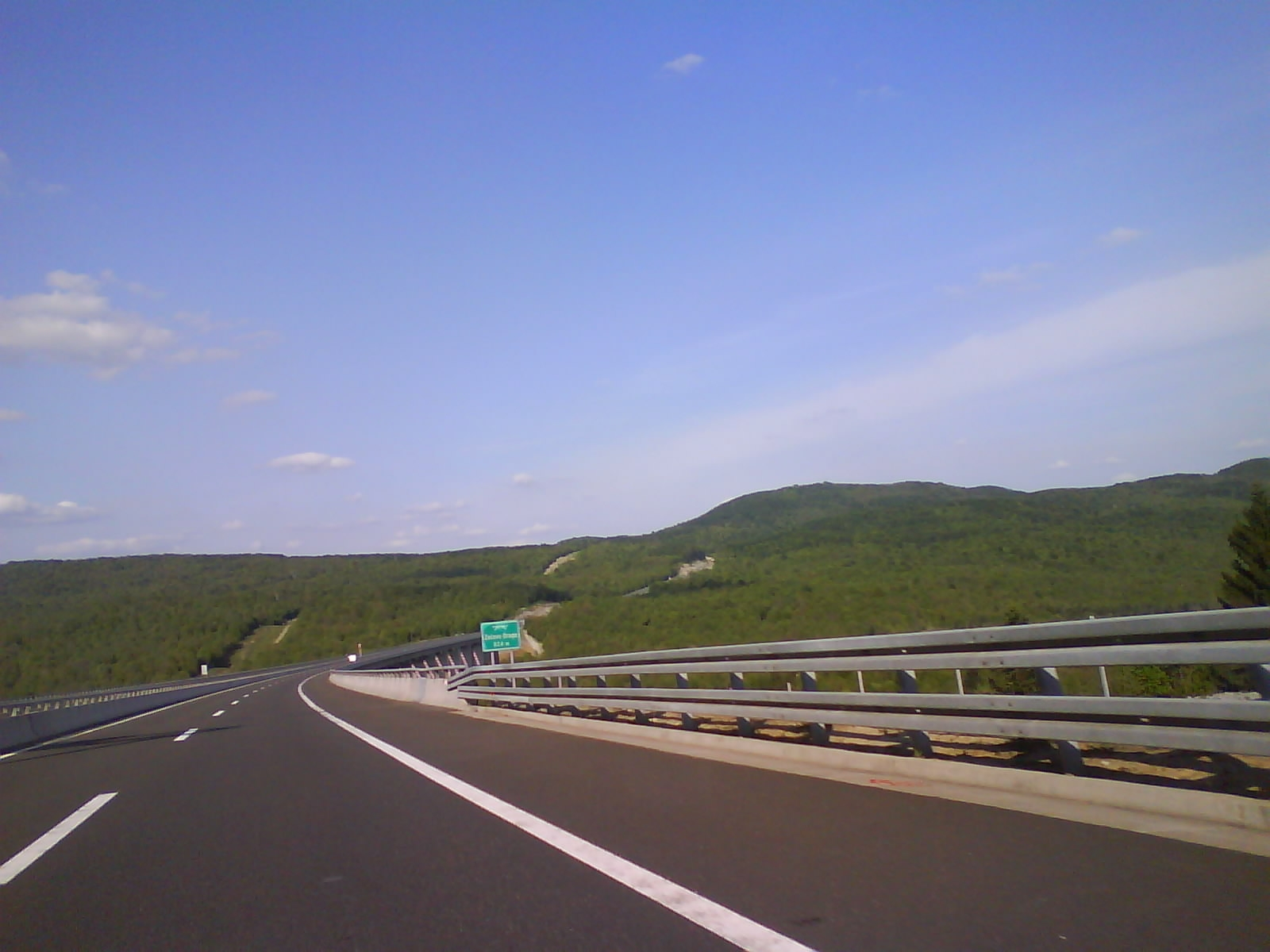
- Coordinates: 45.376478°N 15.127144°E
- Carries: A6 motorway
- Locale: Gorski Kotar, Croatia
- Official name: Viadukt Zečeve Drage
- Maintained by: Autocesta Rijeka–Zagreb

Characteristics
- Design: Box girder bridge
- Total length: 939.23 m (3,081 ft 6 in)
- Width: 2 × 12.9 m (42 ft 4 in)
- Longest span: 50 m (164 ft 1 in)
- Clearance above: 53.04 m (174 ft 0 in)

History
- Opened: 2004

Statistics
- Toll: charged as a part of A6 motorway toll

Location
- Interactive map of Zečeve Drage Viaduct

The Zečeve Drage Viaduct is located between the Bosiljevo 2 and Vrbovsko interchanges of the A6 motorway in Gorski Kotar, Croatia, just to the west of the Veliki Gložac Tunnel. It is 939.2 metres (3,081 ft) long. The viaduct consists of two parallel structures: the first one was completed in 2004, and the second one in 2008. The viaduct is tolled within the A6 motorway ticket system and there are no separate toll plazas associated with its use. The viaduct was completed by Viadukt.

== Structure description ==
At this location the motorway route follows a horizontal curve with a radius of 2,505.1 metres (8,219 ft). The deck of the viaduct follows a 26,500-metre (86,900 ft) radius concave vertical curve, and the longitudinal grade of the road carried by the viaduct ranges from 4.38% to 0.78%. The viaduct is a box girder structure supporting the deck across nineteen spans: two of 40 m (130 ft), sixteen of 50 m (160 ft) and one of 40 m (130 ft). The viaduct piers range from 18.72 m (61.4 ft) to 53.04 m (174.0 ft) in height. The superstructure of the viaduct comprises a box cross section made from pre-stressed reinforced concrete, put in place by incremental launching due to the considerable height of the structure. The launching was carried out downhill, because of the substantial grade of the superstructure, with two VBT 19×140 cable stays as a braking mechanism for the 20,000 tonnes (20,000 long tons; 22,000 short tons) box girder. The cross-sections of the box girder and the piers are virtually identical to those of Bajer Bridge.

== Traffic volume ==
Traffic volumes are regularly measured and reported by Autocesta Rijeka–Zagreb, the operator of the viaduct and A6 motorway where the structure is located, and published by Hrvatske ceste. Substantial variations between annual (AADT) and summer (ASDT) traffic volumes are attributed to the fact that the bridge carries a large amount of tourist traffic to the Adriatic resorts. The traffic count is performed using analysis of motorway toll ticket sales.

Zečeve Drage Viaduct traffic volume
Road	Counting site	AADT	ASDT	Notes
A6	3022 Bosiljevo 2 west	11,448	19,401	Between Bosiljevo 2 and Vrbovsko interchanges.

== See also ==
- List of bridges by length
