= Severinske Drage Viaduct =

Bridge in Croatia

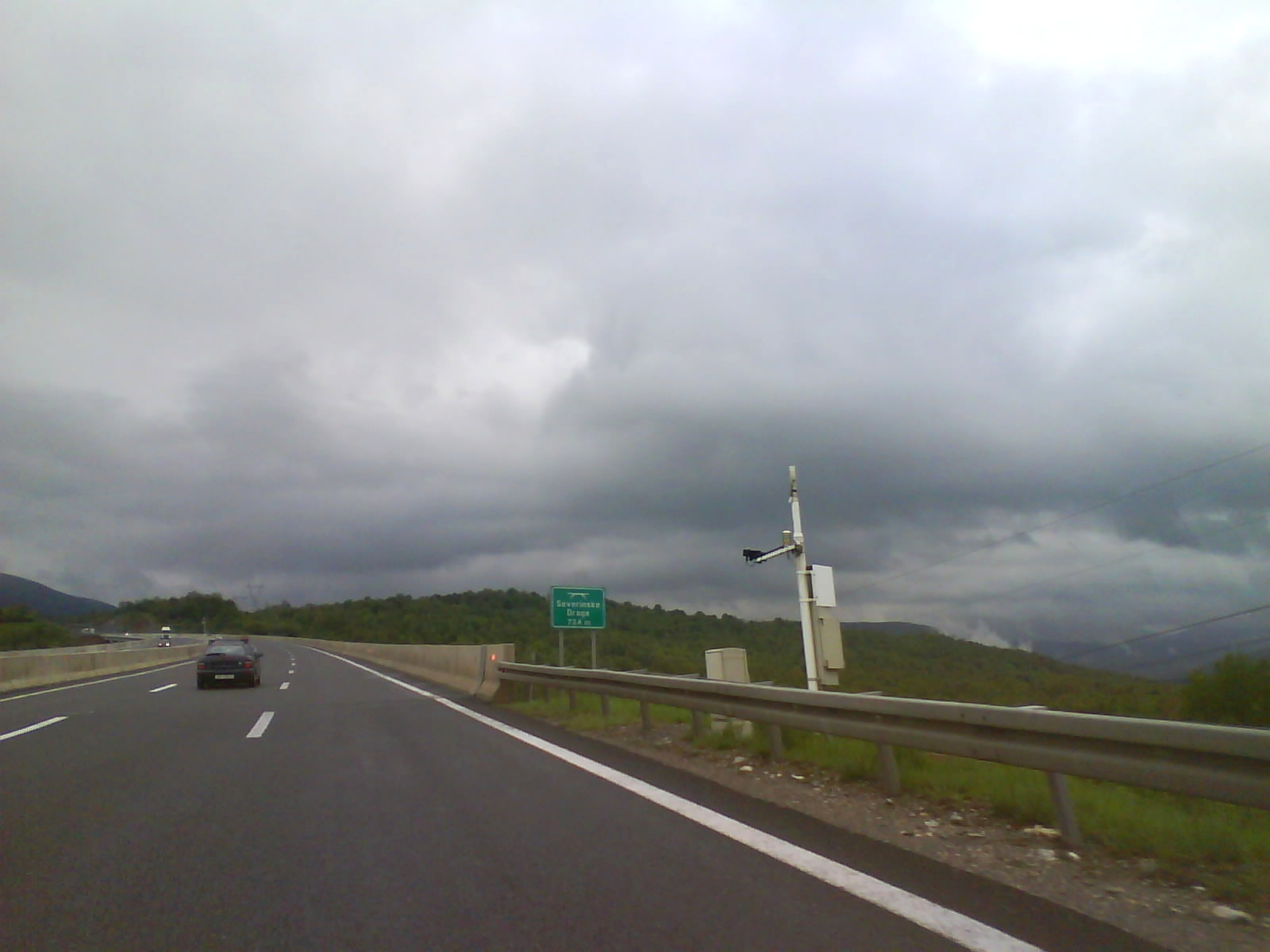
- Coordinates: 45.398601°N 15.213189°E
- Carries: A6 motorway
- Locale: Gorski Kotar, Croatia
- Official name: Viadukt Severinske Drage
- Maintained by: Autocesta Rijeka–Zagreb

Characteristics
- Design: Plate girder bridge
- Total length: 724 m
- Width: 2 x 13.87 m
- Longest span: 39.9 m
- Clearance above: 55 m

History
- Opened: 2004

Statistics
- Toll: charged as a part of A6 motorway toll

Location
- Interactive map of Severinske Drage Viaduct

Severinske Drage Viaduct is located between the Bosiljevo 2 and Vrbovsko interchanges of the A6 motorway in Gorski Kotar, Croatia, just to the east of Veliki Gložac Tunnel. It is 724 metres (2,375 ft) long. The viaduct consists of two parallel structures: The first one was completed in 2004, and the second one in 2007. The viaduct is tolled within the A6 motorway ticket system and there are no separate toll plazas associated with use of the viaduct. The viaduct was designed by Jure Radnić and constructed by Hidroelektra and Konstruktor.

== Structure description ==
At this location the motorway route follows a horizontal curve of 2,655-metre (8,711 ft) radius. Transversal grade of the deck is constant and equal to 2.5%, while elevation grade of the eastern part (closer to Bosiljevo 2) of the viaduct is constant at 5.2505% while its western part (closer to Vrbovsko) follows a concave vertical curve of 12,000-metre (39,000 ft) radius. The viaduct is a beam structure supporting the deck slab across 18 spans: 38.8 m (127 ft) + 16 x 39.9 m (131 ft) + 38.8 m (127 ft).

Superstructure of the viaduct consists of prestressed prefabricated girders executed as freely supported beams. As their longitudinal joints were concreted atop the viaduct piers they comprise continuous girders, made composite with the deck slab using standard reinforcing steel. Cross-section of the viaduct consists of two parallel structures, and each structure comprises five longitudinal girders whose axes are placed 2.6 metres (8 ft 6 in) apart. The deck slab consists of 7 centimetres (2.8 in) thick prefabricated omnia slabs and a 18-centimetre (7.1 in) thick monolithic section completing the deck. Piers of the viaduct comprise a 5-metre (16 ft) by 3.2-metre (10 ft) box section with 30-centimetre (12 in) thick walls. Height of the piers ranges from 20 metres (66 ft) to 55 metres (180 ft), carrying the route across a natural dry valley.

== Traffic volume ==
Traffic is regularly counted and reported by Autocesta Rijeka–Zagreb, operator of the viaduct and the A6 motorway where the structure is located, and published by Hrvatske ceste. Substantial variations between annual (AADT) and summer (ASDT) traffic volumes are attributed to the fact that the bridge carries substantial tourist traffic to the Adriatic resorts. The traffic count is performed using analysis of motorway toll ticket sales.

Severinske Drage Viaduct traffic volume
| Road | Counting site | AADT | ASDT | Notes |
| A6 | 3022 Bosiljevo 2 west | 11,448 | 19,401 | Between Bosiljevo 2 and Vrbovsko interchanges. |

== See also ==
- List of bridges by length
