= Vrata Tunnel =

Road tunnel in Croatia

- Location of Vrata Tunnel in Croatia
- Interactive map of Vrata Tunnel

Overview
- Coordinates: 45.329114°N 14.607267°E

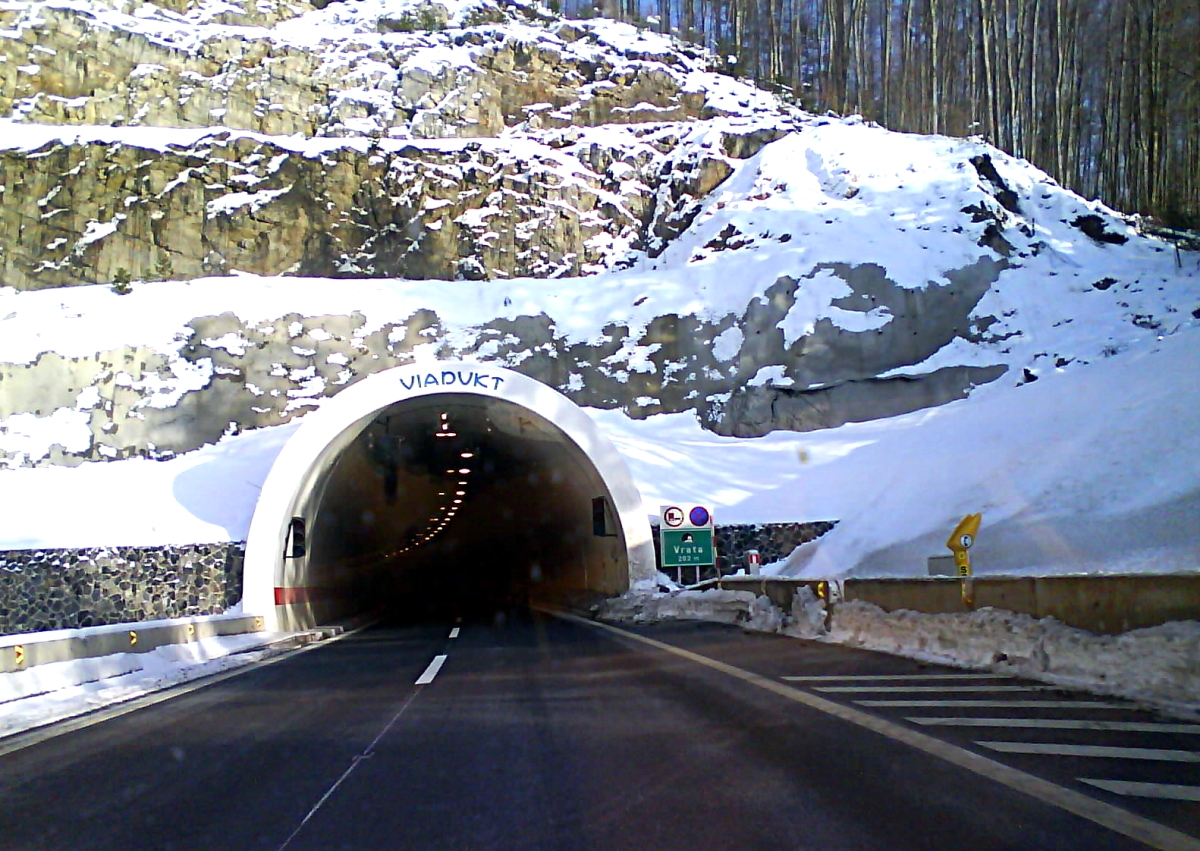
Vrata Tunnel

Vrata Tunnel (Croatian: Tunel Vrata) is one of the shortest tunnels on the Croatian A6 motorway route. It is only 257 metres (843 ft) long and consists of two tunnel tubes. It is located between Oštrovica and Vrata interchanges. The tunnel is tolled within the A6 motorway closed toll collection system. There are no other toll plazas related to use of the tunnel. The tunnel was excavated by Viadukt using New Austrian Tunneling method. The tunnel was originally designed to be 325 metres (1,066 ft) long, but it was shortened due to the landslide on the western portal in the zone of contact between Paleozoic and carbonate layers. The tunnel is noteworthy since it comprises a 58-metre (190 ft) bridge spanning a cavern found during excavation.

== Tunnel bridge ==
During construction, a 83-metre (272 ft) by 63-metre (207 ft) by 45-metre (148 ft) cavern was discovered intersecting the northbound tunnel tube 139 metres (456 ft) away from the eastern tunnel portal. The cavern is located 16 metres (52 ft) away from originally executed, southbound Vrata Tunnel tube and reaches to within 20 metres (66 ft) of the ground surface. A 58-metre (190 ft) bridge was built over the cavern, accounting for nearly one-quarter of the length of the tunnel. The surrounding rock was stabilized using geotechnical anchors to ensure safety before the bridge construction started. The deck of the bridge consists of reinforced concrete grillage supported by a pair of abutments and longitudinal reinforced concrete girders. Since there is an intermittent watercourse through the cavern, the tunnel tube was sealed to protect the cavern and water flowing through it. This was achieved by construction of a concrete structure covering the bridge deck, hiding the cavern from the motorway users and giving them impression of driving through an unbroken tunnel tube.

== Traffic volume ==
Traffic is regularly counted and reported by Autocesta Rijeka–Zagreb, operator of the A6 motorway and the tunnel, and published by Hrvatske ceste. Substantial variations between annual (AADT) and summer (ASDT) traffic volumes are attributed to the fact that the motorway carries substantial tourist traffic to Istria and Kvarner Gulf resorts. The traffic count is performed using analysis of toll ticket sales.

Vrata Tunnel traffic volume
Road	Counting site	AADT	ASDT	Notes
A6	2915 Vrata west	12,413	20,891	Between Vrata and Oštrovica interchanges.

== See also ==
- A6 motorway
- List of longest tunnels
