= Veliki Gložac Tunnel =

Road tunnel in Croatia

- Location of Veliki Gložac Tunnel in Croatia
- Interactive map of Veliki Gložac Tunnel

Overview
- Coordinates: 45.382055°N 15.161819°E

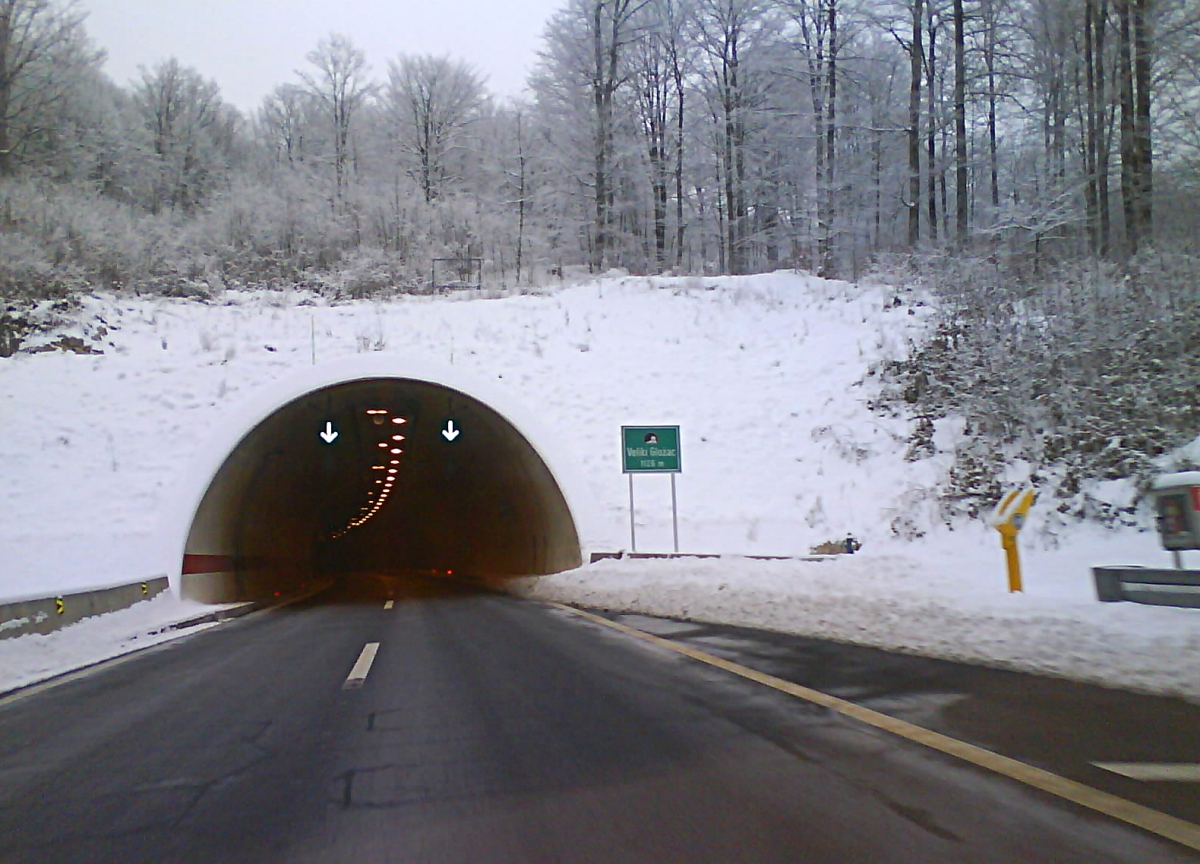
Veliki Gložac Tunnel

Veliki Gložac Tunnel (Croatian: Tunel Veliki Gložac) is one of 13 tunnels found on the Croatian A6 motorway route. It is 1,126 metres (3,694 ft) long and consists of two tunnel tubes. It is located between Vrbovsko and Bosiljevo 2 interchanges. The tunnel is tolled within the A6 motorway closed toll collection system. There are no other toll plazas related to use of the tunnel. Construction of the tunnel was completed by Viadukt and Hidroelektra.

European Tunnel Assessment Program (EuroTAP), a tunnel safety assessment program supported by the European Commission, coordinated by FIA and led by German motoring club ADAC, tested Veliki Gložac Tunnel in 2008, when it achieved very good results—ranking among the four safest road tunnels in Europe.

== Construction ==
Construction of Veliki Gložac Tunnel was started by Spie Batignolles and Mediteran Union Tunel. The construction works contract was cancelled in 2001, and the works were resumed by Viadukt and Hidroelektra in 2002 after a new contract was awarded to them. Similar timeline of events also went on in case of Javorova Kosa and Podvugleš tunnels. The first, 1,115-metre (3,658 ft) tunnel tube of Veliki Gložac Tunnel was excavated by Spie Batignolles and Mediteran Union Tunnel on August 29, 2000, while the second, somewhat longer, tube was excavated by Viadukt and Hidroelektra on November 25, 2005.

Construction of the second tunnel tube was particularly complex due to proximity of the first tunnel tube excavated in five years earlier. Since axes of the two are merely 25 metres (82 ft) apart, and an oil pipeline runs nearby, blasting entailed special precautions. Since the first tunnel tube was already in use, traffic had to be suspended three times a day to allow progress of the works. Initial blast yield was lower and then gradually increased in order to achieve optimum results while maintaining safety. Finally, noise and oscillations of the first tunnel tube and the oil pipeline were constantly monitored to detect any sign of damage. Rock blasting started on June 9, 2005 and lasted until August 15, 2005, with more than 220 charges fired. At each of those times, traffic through the first tunnel tube was suspended for safety reasons. The first tube of the tunnel, now carrying southbound traffic, is further characterized by the fact that it comprises three traffic lanes instead of standard two traffic lanes.

== Traffic volume ==
Traffic is regularly counted and reported by Autocesta Rijeka–Zagreb, operator of the A6 motorway and the tunnel, and published by Hrvatske ceste. Substantial variations between annual (AADT) and summer (ASDT) traffic volumes are attributed to the fact that the motorway carries substantial tourist traffic to Istria and Kvarner Gulf resorts. The traffic count is performed using analysis of toll ticket sales.

Veliki Gložac Tunnel traffic volume
Road	Counting site	AADT	ASDT	Notes
A6	3022 Bosiljevo 2 west	11,448	19,401	Between Bosiljevo 2 and Vrbovsko interchanges.

== See also ==
- A6 motorway
- List of longest tunnels
