= Golubinjak Viaduct =

- Coordinates: 45°21′25″N 14°45′43″E
- Carries: A6 motorway
- Locale: Gorski Kotar, Croatia
- Official name: Viadukt Golubinjak
- Maintained by: Autocesta Rijeka–Zagreb

Characteristics
- Design: Plate girder bridge
- Total length: 724 m
- Width: 2 x 13.87 m
- Longest span: 39.9 m
- Clearance above: 55 m

History
- Opened: 2004

Statistics
- Toll: charged as a part of A6 motorway toll

Road sign

Golubinjak Vidauct is 588-metre (1,929 ft) viaduct located between the Delnice and Vrata interchanges of the A6 motorway in Gorski Kotar, Croatia. The viaduct is tolled within the A6 motorway ticket system and there are no separate toll plazas associated with use of the viaduct. It is 579 metres (1,900 ft) long. The viaduct consists of two parallel structures: The first one was completed in 2004, and the second one in 2008. The viaduct was designed by Inženjerski projektni zavod and constructed by Hidroelektra.

== Traffic volume ==
Traffic is regularly counted and reported by Autocesta Rijeka–Zagreb, operator of the viaduct and the A6 motorway where the structure is located, and published by Hrvatske ceste. Substantial variations between annual (AADT) and summer (ASDT) traffic volumes are attributed to the fact that the bridge carries substantial tourist traffic to the Adriatic resorts. The traffic count is performed using analysis of motorway toll ticket sales.

Golubinjak Viaduct traffic volume
Road	Counting site	AADT	ASDT	Notes
A6	2910 Delnice west	12,600	21,150	Between Delnice and Vrata interchanges.

== See also ==
- List of bridges by length
