= Podvugleš Tunnel =

Road tunnel in Croatia

- Location of Podvugleš Tunnel in Croatia
- Interactive map of Podvugleš Tunnel

Overview
- Coordinates: 45.375513°N 14.967456°E

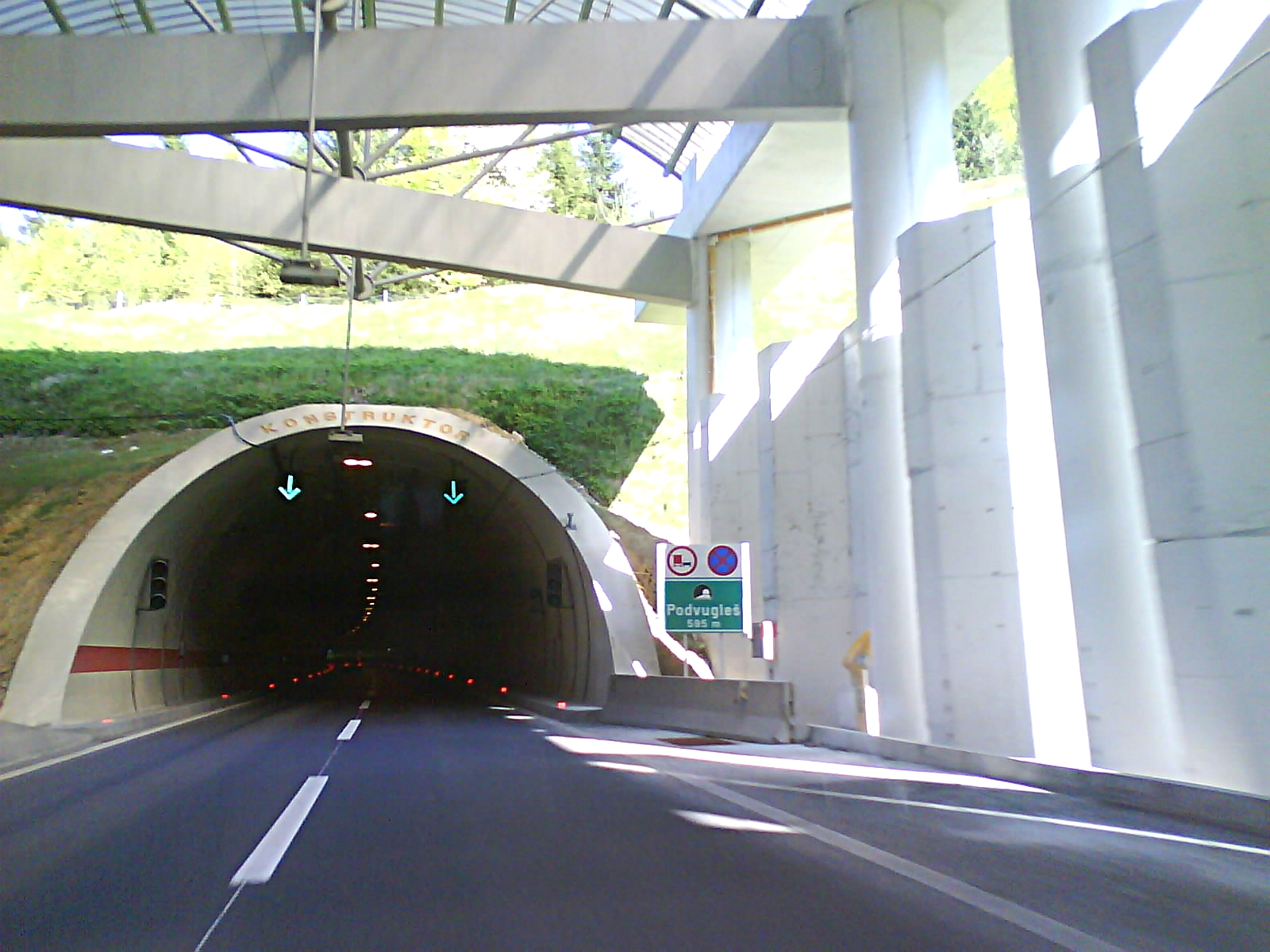
Podvugleš Tunnel

Podvugleš Tunnel (Croatian: Tunel Podvugleš) is one of 13 tunnels found on the Croatian A6 motorway route. Its tubes are 602 metres (1,975 ft) and 595 metres (1,952 ft) long. It is located between Vrbovsko and Ravna Gora interchanges. The tunnel is tolled within the A6 motorway closed toll collection system. There are no other toll plazas related to use of the tunnel. Various publications spell name of the tunnel as Podvugleš and Pod Vugleš, however the tunnel is signposted as Podvugleš Tunnel. Construction of the tunnel was completed by Konstruktor.

== Construction ==
Construction of Podvugleš Tunnel was started by Spie Batignolles and Mediteran Union Tunel. The construction works contract was cancelled in 2001, and the works were resumed by Konstruktor in 2002 after a new contract was awarded to them. Konstruktor completed the construction of the first tunnel tube by June 2003 and the second one in June 2007. The tunnel was executed using the New Austrian Tunneling method.

Construction of the tunnel was hindered by low air temperatures, dropping to −32 °C (−26 °F). This was especially problematic as concrete plant used for the works was 18 kilometres (11 mi) away. Later, during execution of the secondary tunnel tube lining, the tunnel caved in due to a hydraulic failure of surrounding soil, caused by considerable inflow of meltwater. The failure affected a 6-metre (20 ft) section of the tunnel, and 400 cubic metres (14,000 cu ft) of rock and soil had to be removed to remedy the situation. The incident, however, caused no delay of completion schedule.

== Portal cover ==
Podvugleš Tunnel is separated from Javorova Kosa Tunnel by 30 metres (98 ft) of motorway. In order to avoid occurrence of rapidly changing pavement conditions for traffic transiting from one of the tunnels to the other, a translucent cover was executed to protect the route between the tunnels. The cover is 66.18 metres (217.1 ft) long by 45 metres (148 ft) wide. It is supported by three rows of 11-metre (36 ft) tall concrete columns. The cover is designed to permit ventilation of the tunnels and use of emergency exits.

== Traffic volume ==
Traffic is regularly counted and reported by Autocesta Rijeka–Zagreb, operator of the A6 motorway and the tunnel, and published by Hrvatske ceste. Substantial variations between annual (AADT) and summer (ASDT) traffic volumes are attributed to the fact that the motorway carries substantial tourist traffic to Istria and Kvarner Gulf resorts. The traffic count is performed using analysis of toll ticket sales.

Podvugleš Tunnel traffic volume
| Road | Counting site | AADT | ASDT | Notes |
| A6 | 3006 Vrbovsko west | 11,979 | 20,091 | Between Vrbovsko and Ravna Gora interchanges. |

== See also ==
- A6 motorway
- List of longest tunnels
