= Javorova Kosa Tunnel =

Road tunnel in Croatia

Coordinates: 45.37886°N 14.953036°E

- Location of Javorova Kosa Tunnel in Croatia
- Interactive map of Javorova Kosa Tunnel

Overview

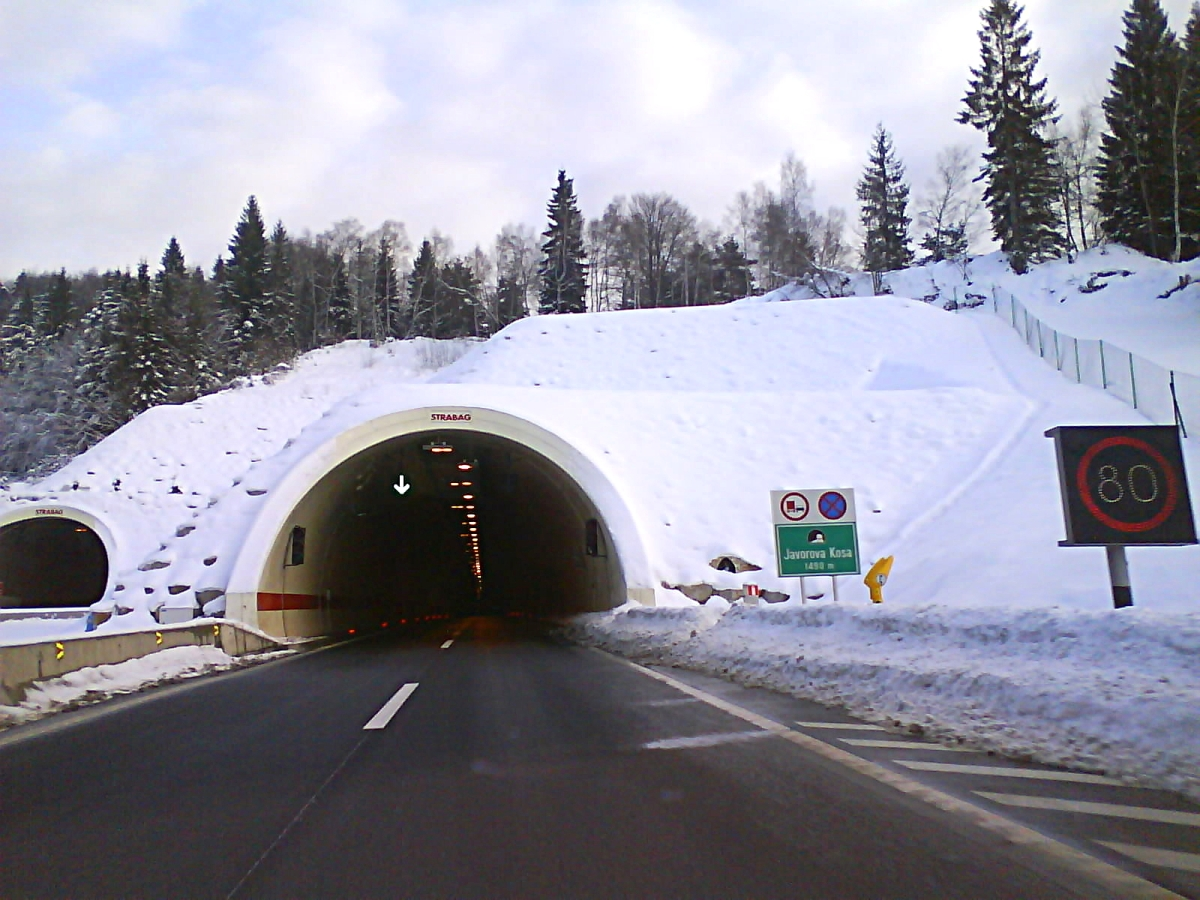
Javorova Kosa Tunnel

Javorova Kosa Tunnel (Croatian: Tunel Javorova Kosa) is one of the most significant structures on the Croatian A6 motorway route. It is 1,490 metres (4,890 ft) long and consists of two tunnel tubes. It is located between Vrbovsko and Ravna Gora interchanges. The tunnel is tolled within the A6 motorway closed toll collection system. There are no other toll plazas related to the use of the tunnel.

== Construction ==
Javorova Kosa Tunnel was designed by Inženjersko projektni zavod and its construction was started by Spie Batignolles and Mediteran Union Tunel. The construction works contract was cancelled in 2001, with 232 metres (761 ft) of the tunnel left to excavate. The works were resumed by Konstruktor and STRABAG AG in 2002 after a new contract was awarded to them. Konstruktor completed the construction by June 2003. The tunnel was excavated using the New Austrian Tunneling method.

Construction of the tunnel was hindered by low air temperatures, dropping to −32 °C (−26 °F). This was especially problematic as the concrete plant used for the works was 18 kilometres (11 mi) away. Later, during execution of the secondary tunnel tube lining, the tunnel caved in due to a hydraulic failure of surrounding soil, caused by considerable inflow of meltwater. The failure affected a 6-metre (20 ft) section of the tunnel, and 400 cubic metres (14,000 cu ft) of rock and soil had to be removed to remedy the situation. The incident, however, caused no delay of completion schedule.

== Portal cover ==
Javorova Kosa Tunnel is separated from Podvugleš Tunnel by 30 metres (98 ft) of motorway. In order to avoid occurrence of rapidly changing pavement conditions for traffic transiting from one of the tunnels to the other, a translucent cover was executed to protect the route between the tunnels. The cover is 66.18 metres (217.1 ft) long by 45 metres (148 ft) wide. It is supported by three rows of 11 metres (36 ft) tall concrete columns. The cover is designed to permit ventilation of the tunnels and use of emergency exits.

== Traffic volume ==
Traffic is regularly counted and reported by Autocesta Rijeka–Zagreb, operator of the A6 motorway and the tunnel, and published by Hrvatske ceste. Substantial variations between annual (AADT) and summer (ASDT) traffic volumes are attributed to the fact that the motorway carries substantial tourist traffic to Istria and Kvarner Gulf resorts. The traffic count is performed using analysis of toll ticket sales.

Javorova Kosa Tunnel traffic volume
| Road | Counting site | AADT | ASDT | Notes |
| A6 | 3006 Vrbovsko west | 11,979 | 20,091 | Between Vrbovsko and Ravna Gora interchanges. |

== See also ==
- A6 motorway
- List of longest tunnels
