= Bajer Bridge =

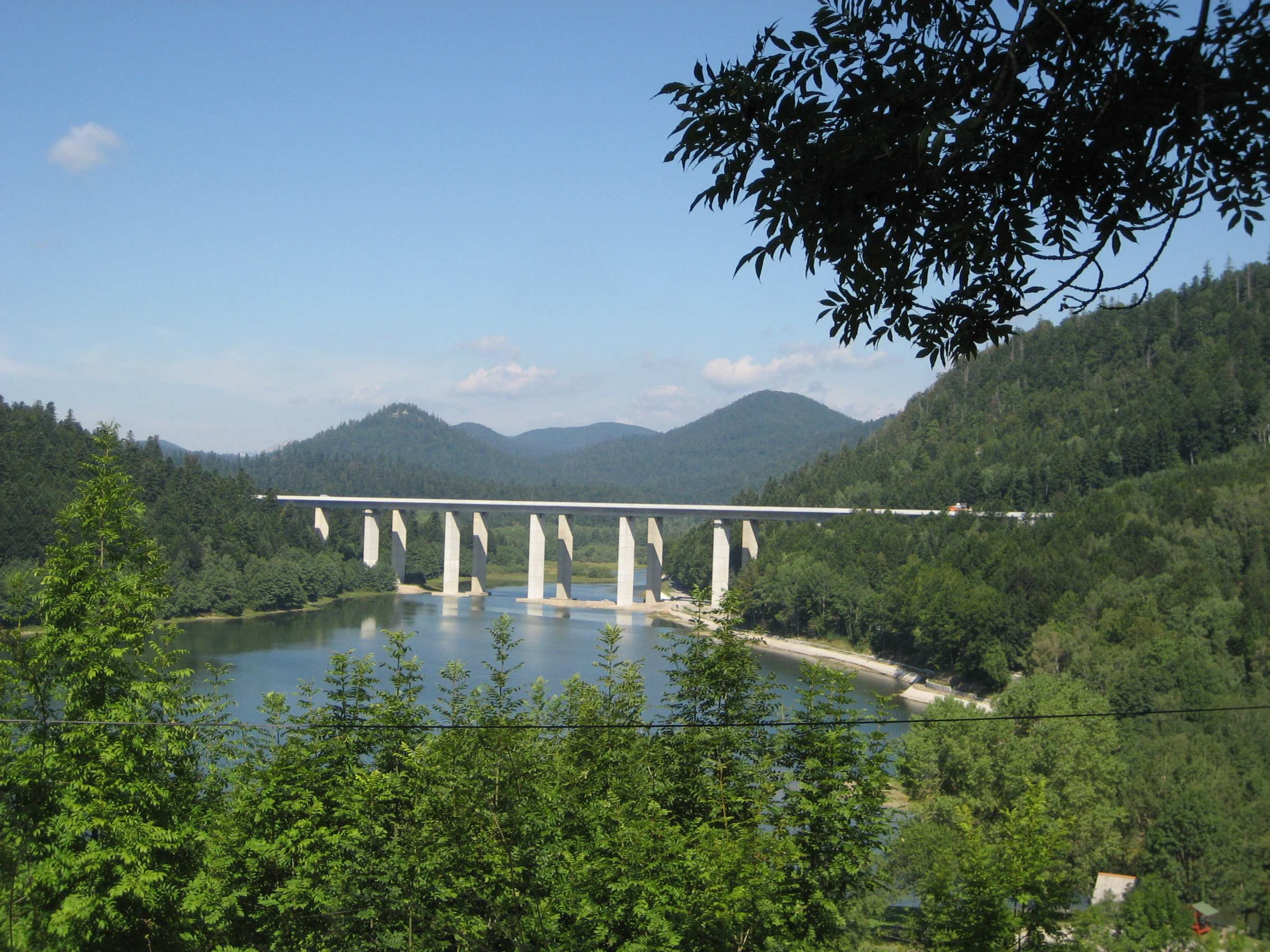
- Coordinates: 45.316758°N 14.710822°E
- Carries: A6 motorway
- Crosses: Lake Bajer
- Locale: Gorski Kotar, Croatia
- Official name: Most Bajer
- Maintained by: Autocesta Rijeka–Zagreb

Characteristics
- Design: Box girder bridge
- Total length: 520 m
- Width: 2 x 12.05 m
- Longest span: 50.16 m
- Clearance above: 41 m

History
- Opened: 1995

Statistics
- Toll: charged as a part of A6 motorway toll

Location
- Interactive map of Bajer Bridge

Bajer Bridge is located between the Vrata and Oštrovica interchanges of the A6 motorway in Gorski Kotar, Croatia, spanning Lake Bajer. It is 520 metres (1,710 ft) long. The bridge consists of two parallel structures: The first one was completed in 1995, and the second one in 2008. The bridge is tolled within the A6 motorway ticket system and there are no separate toll plazas associated with use of the bridge. The bridge was constructed by Viadukt.

== Structure description ==
At this location the motorway route follows a horizontal curve of 2,006-metre (6,581 ft) radius. Transversal grade of the deck is constant and equal to 2.5%, while elevation grade of the bridge is constant at 0.835%, sloping down towards Oštrovica. The bridge is a box girder structure supporting the deck across 10 spans: 42.63 m (139.9 ft) + 8 x 50.16 m (164.6 ft) + 42.63 m (139.9 ft). Since the elevation of the bridge lies 41 metres (135 ft) above the average water level of Lake Bajer, incremental launching of the bridge was executed without use of any auxiliary piers. The main longitudinal girders comprise box cross-section and were divided in 19 sections each (2 x 27.94 m (91.7 ft) + 15 x 25.08 m (82.3 ft) + 2 x 27.94 m (91.7 ft)). Piers of the bridge comprise a 6.6-metre (22 ft) by 3.1-metre (10 ft) box cross-section with 30 centimetres (12 in) thick walls. Bridge abutments and shore piers have shallow foundations, while those piers located within the lake have foundations executed on groups of six piles each. The piles are circular in cross section, 1.5 metres (4 ft 11 in) in diameter, and are connected with beam cap slabs measuring 8.5 m (28 ft) x 9.5 m (31 ft) x 2.5 m (8 ft 2 in).

== Traffic volume ==
Traffic is regularly counted and reported by Autocesta Rijeka–Zagreb, operator of the viaduct and the A6 motorway where the structure is located, and published by Hrvatske ceste. Substantial variations between annual (AADT) and summer (ASDT) traffic volumes are attributed to the fact that the bridge carries substantial tourist traffic to the Adriatic resorts. The traffic count is performed using analysis of motorway toll ticket sales.

Bajer Bridge traffic volume
Road	Counting site	AADT	ASDT	Notes
A6	2915 Vrata west	12,413	20,891	Between Vrata and Oštrovica interchanges.

== See also ==
- List of bridges by length
