= Dobra Bridge (A6) =

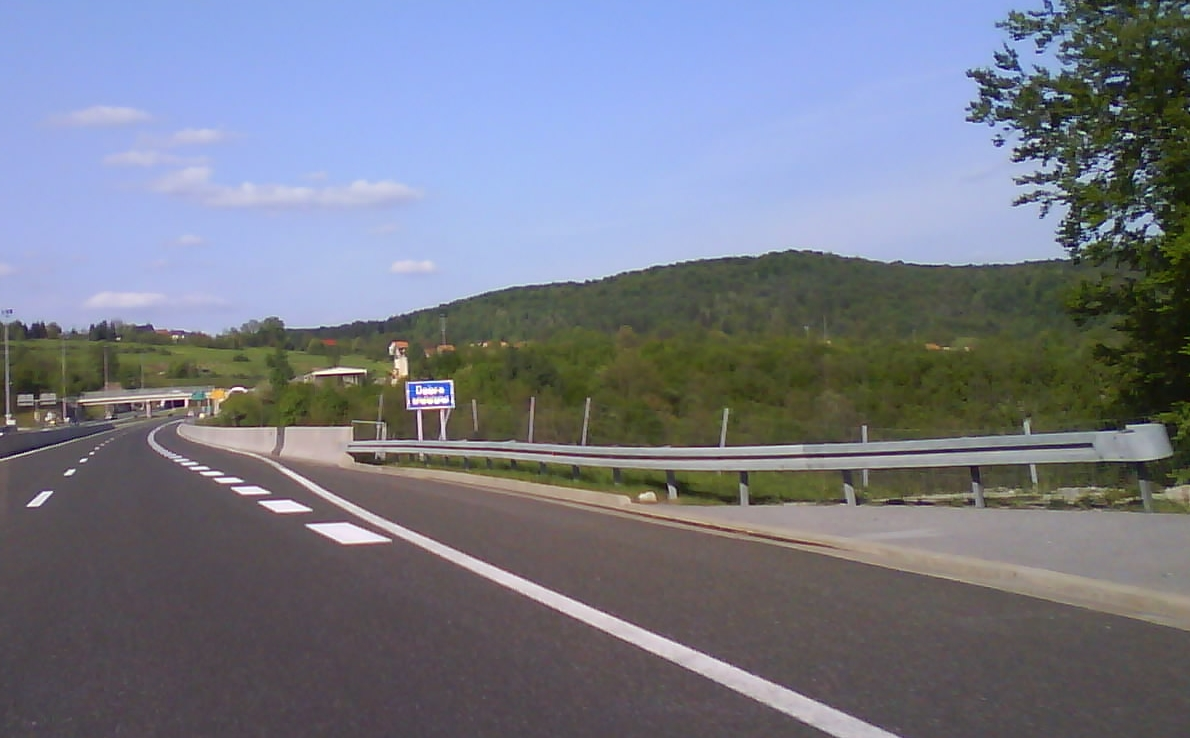
- Coordinates: 45.362459°N 15.081224°E
- Carries: A6 motorway
- Crosses: Dobra River
- Locale: Gorski Kotar, Croatia
- Official name: Most Dobra
- Maintained by: Autocesta Rijeka–Zagreb

Characteristics
- Design: Box girder bridge
- Total length: 246.95 m
- Longest span: 51 m
- Clearance below: 61 m

History
- Opened: 2003

Statistics
- Toll: charged as a part of A6 motorway toll

Dobra Bridge is located between the Vrbovsko and Ravna Gora interchanges of the A6 motorway in Gorski Kotar, Croatia, spanning Dobra River. It is 246.95 metres (810.2 ft) long and carries the motorway across five spans. The bridge consists of two parallel structures, both completed in 2003 by Primorje. The bridge is tolled within the A6 motorway ticket system and there are no separate toll plazas associated with use of the bridge. The bridge is located in a water protection area.

== Traffic volume ==
Traffic is regularly counted and reported by Autocesta Rijeka–Zagreb, operator of the viaduct and the A6 motorway where the structure is located, and published by Hrvatske ceste. Substantial variations between annual (AADT) and summer (ASDT) traffic volumes are attributed to the fact that the bridge carries substantial tourist traffic to the Adriatic resorts. The traffic count is performed using analysis of motorway toll ticket sales.

Dobra Bridge traffic volume
Road	Counting site	AADT	ASDT	Notes
A6	3006 Vrbovsko west	11,979	20,091	Between Vrbovsko and Ravna Gora interchanges.

== See also ==
- List of bridges by length
