= Tuhobić Tunnel =

Tunnel in Croatia

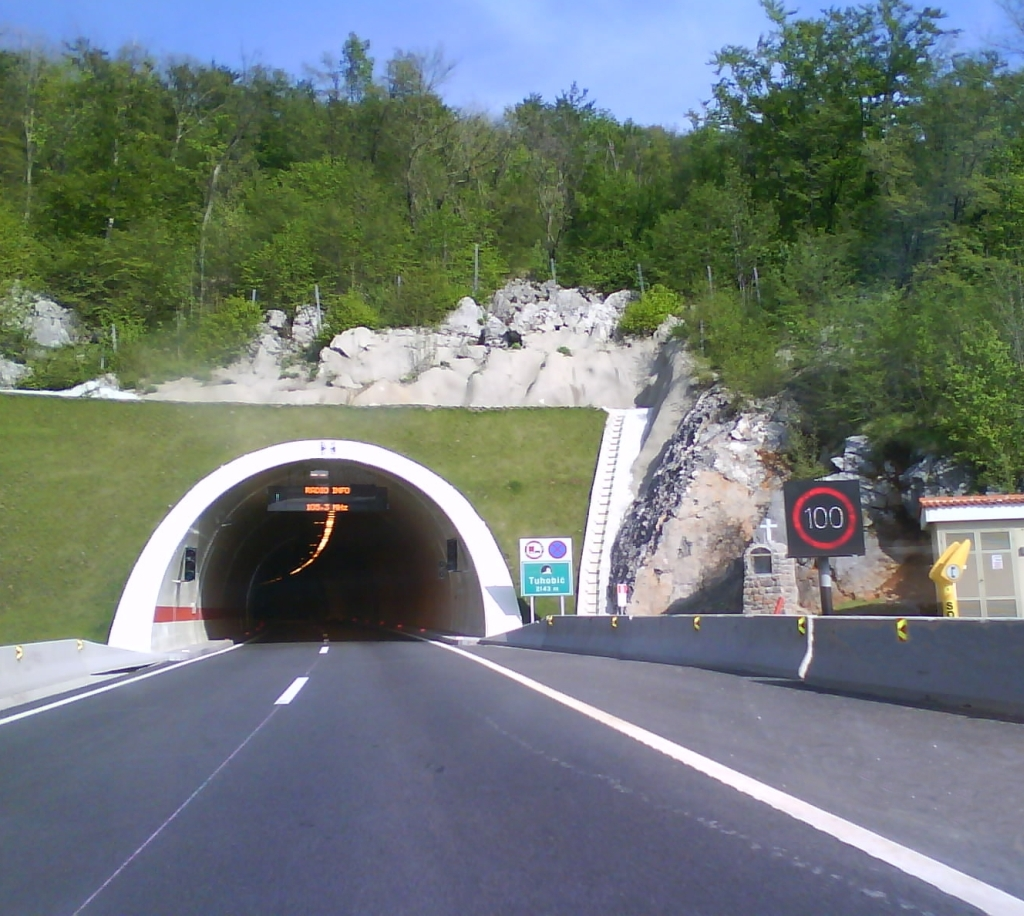

- Location within Croatia
- Interactive map of Tuhobić Tunnel

Overview
- Official name: Croatian: Tunel Tuhobić
- Location: Primorje-Gorski Kotar County, Croatia
- Coordinates: 45°19′23″N 14°38′33″E
- Route: A6

Operation
- Opened: 1997 (first tunnel); October 22, 2008 (second tunnel)
- Operator: Autocesta Rijeka–Zagreb

Technical
- Length: 2,143 metres (7,031 ft) (southbound tube)

Tuhobić Tunnel (Croatian: Tunel Tuhobić) is one of the most significant structures on the Croatian A6 motorway route. As it is 2,143 metres (7,031 ft) long (southbound tube), Tuhobić Tunnel is the longest tunnel on the A6 motorway route. The tunnel is located at 700 metres (2,300 ft) above sea level, connecting the Gorski Kotar and Croatian Littoral regions. The tunnel is located between the Vrata and Oštrovica interchanges.

Tunnel excavation started in 1996, and the first tunnel tube opened in 1997, along with some sections of Rijeka–Zagreb motorway. Since the motorway was initially executed as a semi-motorway, the second tunnel tube was not excavated for a decade — its construction started August 2006, excavation was completed in August 2007, and the completed motorway, including the second Tuhobić Tunnel tube was opened on October 22, 2008. The tunnel is tolled within the A6 motorway closed toll collection system. There are no other toll plazas related to use of the tunnel.

== Safety ==
European Tunnel Assessment Program (EuroTAP), a tunnel safety assessment program supported by the European Commission, coordinated by FIA and led by German motoring club ADAC, tested Tuhobić Tunnel twice — once in 2004, when it achieved poor results, and once again in 2009 after implementation of EuroTAP safety recommendations. Unlike the first inspection, in the 2009 test, the tunnel ranked the second safest in Europe.

== Traffic volume ==
Traffic is regularly counted and reported by Autocesta Rijeka–Zagreb, operator of the A6 motorway and the tunnel, and published by Hrvatske ceste. Substantial variations between annual (AADT) and summer (ASDT) traffic volumes are attributed to the fact that the motorway carries substantial tourist traffic to Istria and Kvarner Gulf resorts. The traffic count is performed using analysis of toll ticket sales.

Tuhobić Tunnel traffic volume
Road	Counting site	AADT	ASDT	Notes
A6	2915 Vrata west	12,413	20,891	Between Vrata and Oštrovica interchanges.

== See also ==
- A6 motorway
- List of longest tunnels
