= A6 (Croatia) =

Highway in Croatia

A6 motorway
- Autocesta A6
- Goranka
- in use other motorways

Route information
- Part of
- Length: 80.2 km (49.8 mi)

Major junctions
- From: A1 in Bosiljevo 2 interchange
- D3 in Delnice interchange D501 in Oštrovica interchange D40 in Čavle interchange
- To: A7 in Orehovica interchange

Location
- Country: Croatia
- Counties: Karlovac, Primorje-Gorski Kotar
- Major cities: Vrbovsko, Delnice, Rijeka

Highway system
- Highways in Croatia

The A6 motorway (Croatian: Autocesta A6) is a motorway in Croatia spanning 80.2 kilometres (49.8 mi). It connects the nation's capital, Zagreb, via the A1, to the seaport of Rijeka. The motorway forms a major north–south transportation corridor in Croatia and is a part of European route E65 Nagykanizsa–Zagreb–Rijeka–Zadar–Split–Dubrovnik–Podgorica. The A6 motorway route also follows Pan-European corridor Vb.

The A6 motorway runs near a number of Croatian cities, provides access to Risnjak National Park and indirectly to numerous resorts, notably in the Istria and Kvarner Gulf regions. The motorway route was completed in 2008. The motorway is nationally significant because of its positive economic impact on the cities and towns it connects, and because of its contribution to tourism in Croatia. The importance of the motorway as a transit route will be further increased upon completion of a proposed expansion of the Port of Rijeka and Rijeka transport node.

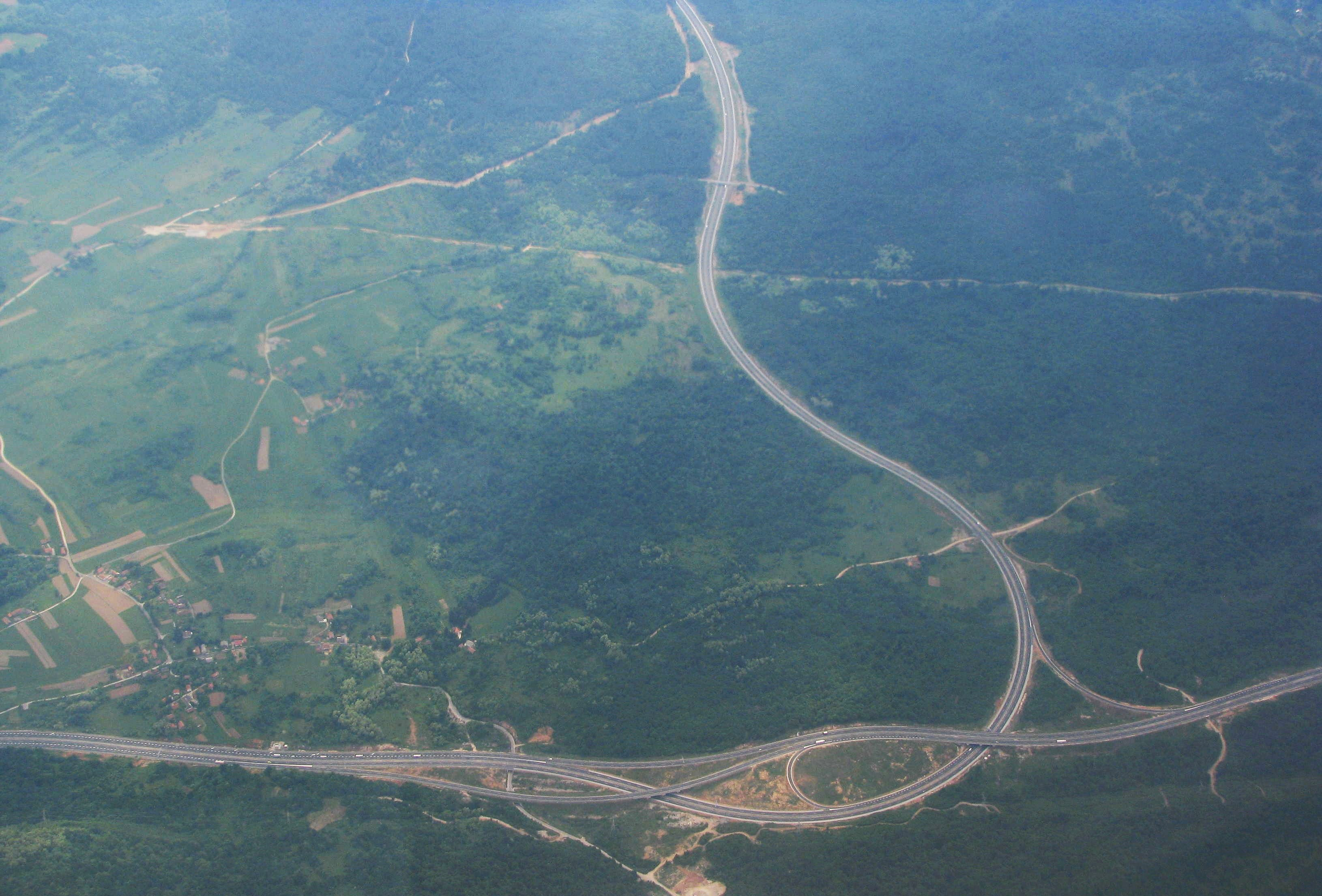
Bosiljevo 2 interchange, the northern terminus of the A6 motorway

The motorway consists of two traffic lanes and an emergency lane in each driving direction separated by a central reservation. Sections of the motorway that have a gradient greater than 4% are divided into three lanes to prevent traffic problems caused by slower vehicles. These sections have no emergency lanes. Similarly, there are no emergency lanes in the tunnels. All intersections of the A6 motorway are grade separated. As the route traverses rugged mountains it requires numerous long bridges, viaducts, tunnels, and other structures. As of 2010 there are nine exits and three rest areas situated along the route. The majority of the motorway is a ticket system toll road with pricing tied to vehicle classification. Each exit between Grobnik mainline toll plaza and Bosiljevo 2 interchange has a toll plaza. No toll is charged at Bosiljevo 2 where the traffic switches to the A1 motorway; traffic is tolled upon leaving the A1 motorway. Exits between the mainline toll plaza and Orehovica interchange have no toll plazas, as that part of the A6 route is not tolled.

A motorway connecting Zagreb and Rijeka was originally designed in the early 1970s, and construction started north of Rijeka and south of Zagreb. The first section, between Rijeka and Kikovica, opened on September 9, 1972, and a Zagreb–Karlovac section followed on December 29, 1972. Those sections were the first modern motorways to be built in Croatia and Yugoslavia. Due to political upheavals in Croatia and Yugoslavia, construction of the motorway was labeled a "nationalist project" and, along with the proposed Zagreb–Split motorway, was cancelled in 1971. After the Croatian War of Independence, efforts to build the motorway were renewed and construction resumed in 1996. In 2004, a two-lane, single carriageway expressway was completed between the sections completed 25 years previously, and the second carriageway was built; the motorway was completed on October 22, 2008. Construction costs are estimated at 661.5 million euro. Although Hrvatske autoceste normally designs, builds, and operates motorways in Croatia, the A6 motorway is operated and maintained by Autocesta Rijeka – Zagreb.

== Route description ==
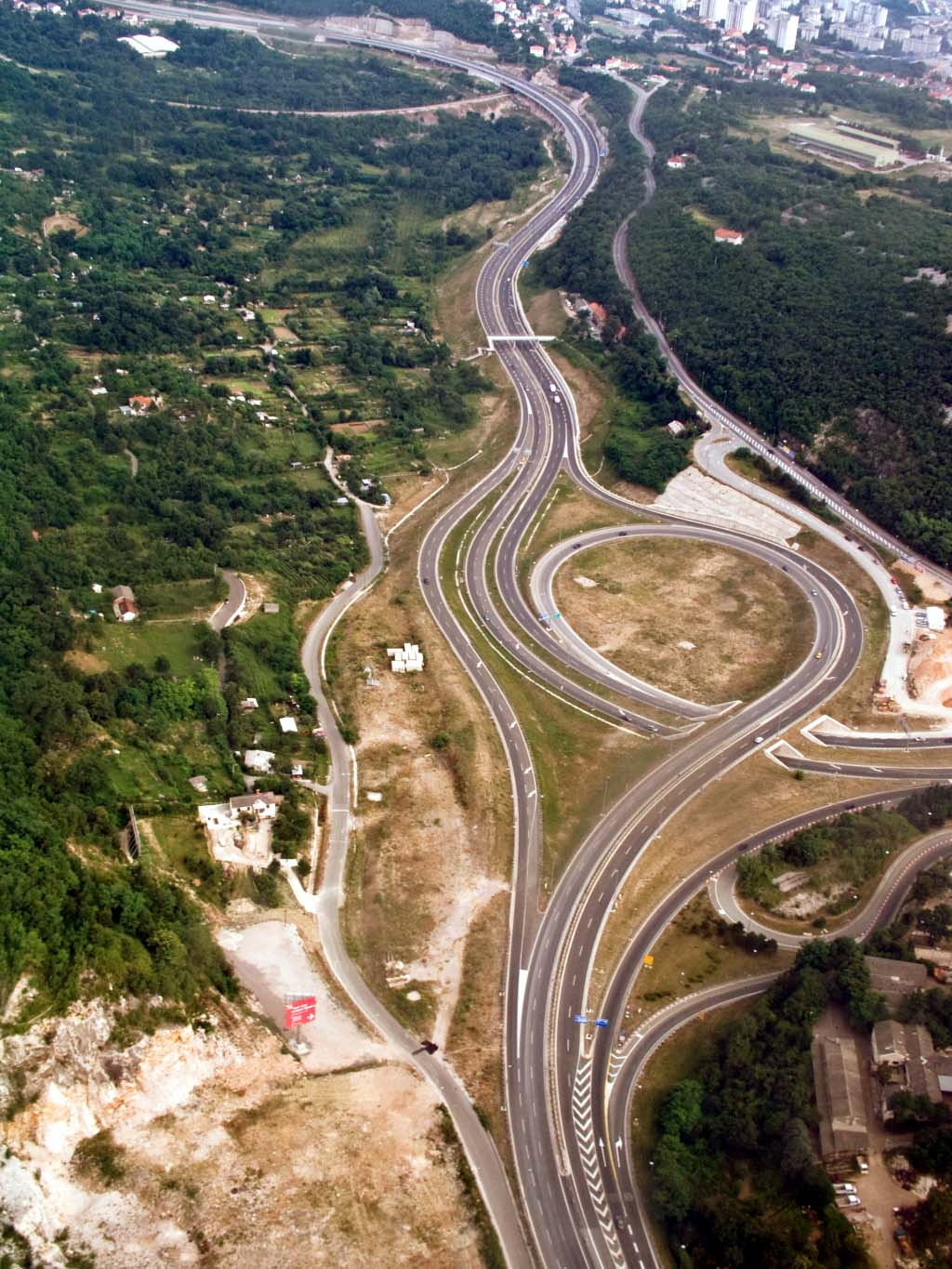
Orehovica interchange, the southern terminus of the A6 motorway

The A6 motorway is a significant north–south motorway in Croatia connecting the largest seaport of the country, Rijeka, to its hinterland and to the rest of the Croatian motorway network via the A1 motorway Bosiljevo 2 interchange. The motorway follows a route through the Gorski Kotar region. Part of the road network of Croatia, the motorway is also part of European route E65 Nagykanizsa–Zagreb–Rijeka–Zadar–Split–Dubrovnik–Podgorica. The motorway is of major importance to Croatia in terms of development of the economy; it is especially important for tourism and as a transit transport route. The road serves tourist resorts in Istria and the Kvarner Gulf islands. Because of the link formed between Zagreb and Rijeka, tourism-related traffic originating from the countries neighbouring Croatia to the north flows via this road to the Adriatic coast on the south. The road also serves tourists originating in the northern inland areas of Croatia. The A6 route predominantly follows an east–west orientation, but the motorway is locally regarded as a north–south communication. The ultimate importance of the motorway as a transit route shall be achieved upon completion of the proposed expansion of Port of Rijeka and the Rijeka transport node. The expansion is planned to encompass an enhancement of the cargo handling capacity of the Port of Rijeka; improved railroad links; and a new Rijeka bypass motorway linking the A6, via a new interchange, with the present routes of the A7 and A8 motorways. One of the aims of the project is to increase traffic along the A6 route. As of the June 1997 Pan-European Transport Conference in Helsinki, the motorway is a part of the Pan-European corridor Vb.

The motorway spans 80.2 kilometres (49.8 mi) between Bosiljevo 2 interchange and Rijeka–Orehovica interchange on the A7 motorway. The route serves Vrbovsko via the D42, Delnice via the D3, Crikvenica and Krk via the D501, and Bakar via the D40 state road. The route is complete and further development of the motorway includes only the construction of additional rest areas. The A6 motorway consists of at least two traffic lanes and an emergency lane in each driving direction along its entire length, except in tunnels, where there are emergency bays instead. Sections of the A6 motorway steeper than 4% grade have three traffic lanes, and slow vehicles are restricted to driving in the rightmost lane. All of the interchanges are trumpet interchanges. There are a number of rest areas along the motorway providing various types of services ranging from simple parking spaces and restrooms to filling stations, restaurants, and hotels. As of October 2010, the motorway has nine interchanges providing access to numerous towns and cities and the Croatian state road network. The motorway is operated by Autocesta Rijeka–Zagreb.

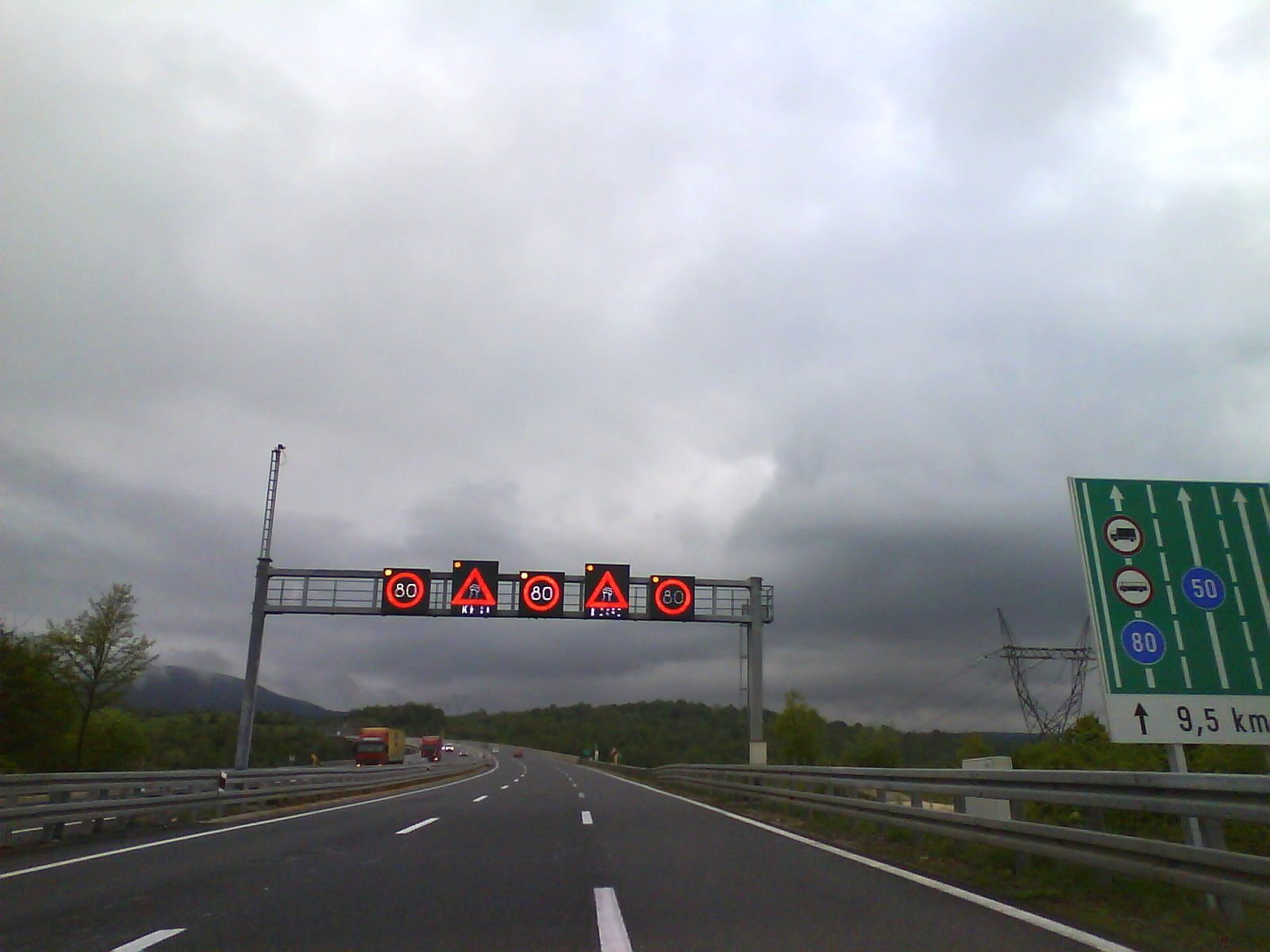
Variable traffic signs on the A6

An automatic traffic monitoring and guidance system is in place along the motorway. It consists of measuring, control, and signalling devices, located in zones where driving conditions may vary—at interchanges, near viaducts, bridges, tunnels, and in zones where fog and strong wind are known to occur. The system comprises variable traffic signs used to communicate changing driving conditions, possible restrictions, and other information to motorway users.

The A6 motorway mainly runs through the mountainous Gorski Kotar region, requiring not only large bridges and viaducts and long tunnels along the route, but also special care must be paid to protection of the environment, as the route is located in karst terrain, with numerous water supply protection zones and significant natural heritage. Risnjak National Park is located near the A6 route, and is accessed via the Delnice interchange. Due to the motorway access and its proximity to a number of seaside resorts, Risnjak is the most visited national park in Croatia. Karst terrain is especially susceptible to water pollution, so the A6 motorway is equipped with a closed water drainage system designed to channel rainwater, meltwater, and any spillages to purpose-built processing facilities. Approximately 200 karst features—caves and other types of karst features—were observed and protected during construction of the motorway. An extraordinary example of this was a cavern 83 m (272 ft) long by 63 m (207 ft) wide and 45 m (148 ft) tall, found during execution of the 260 m (850 ft) long Vrata Tunnel. The cavern was bridged by one of the tunnel tubes, which was sealed to protect the cavern and the water flowing through it.

== Toll ==
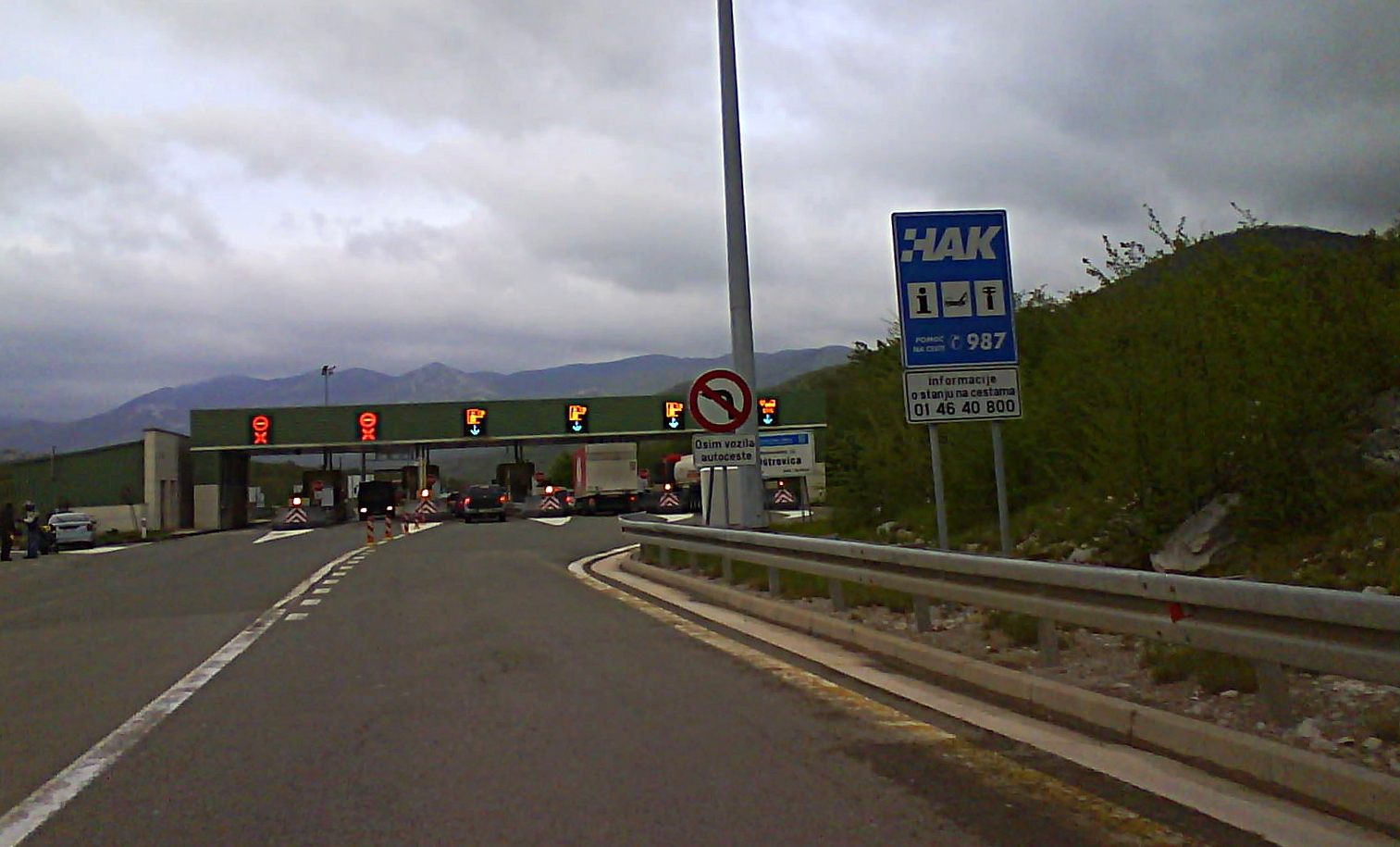
Oštrovica toll plaza

The A6 is a tolled motorway based on the vehicle classification in Croatia using a closed toll system integrated with the A1 motorway. The two roads connect at the Bosiljevo 2 interchange, forming a unified toll system. Since the A1 motorway is operated jointly by Autocesta Rijeka–Zagreb and Hrvatske autoceste, the toll collection system is operated jointly by the two operators. As of October 2010, the toll charged along the A6 route between Bosiljevo 2 interchange (A1 Bosiljevo exit) and the Kikovica mainline toll plaza varies depending on the length of route travelled and ranges from 6.00 kuna (0.82 euros) to 33.00 kuna (4.52 euros) for passenger cars and 25.00 kuna (3.42 euro) to 139.00 kuna (19.04 euro) for semi-trailer trucks. The toll is payable in either Croatian kuna or euros and by major credit cards and debit cards. A number of prepaid toll collection systems are also used, including various types of smart cards issued by the motorway operator and ENC—an electronic toll collection (ETC) system which is shared by most motorways in Croatia and provides drivers with discounted toll rates for dedicated lanes at toll plazas.

The toll collected by Autocesta Rijeka–Zagreb for use of the A6 motorway is not reported separately. Autocesta Rijeka–Zagreb only reports it total toll revenue, including toll revenue collected on the A7 motorway (Rupa–Jurdani section) and the A1 motorway (Lučko–Bosiljevo 2 section) as well as on the Krk Bridge. In the first half of the 2010 their toll revenue was 188.2 million Croatian kuna (25.3 million euros).

== Notable structures ==
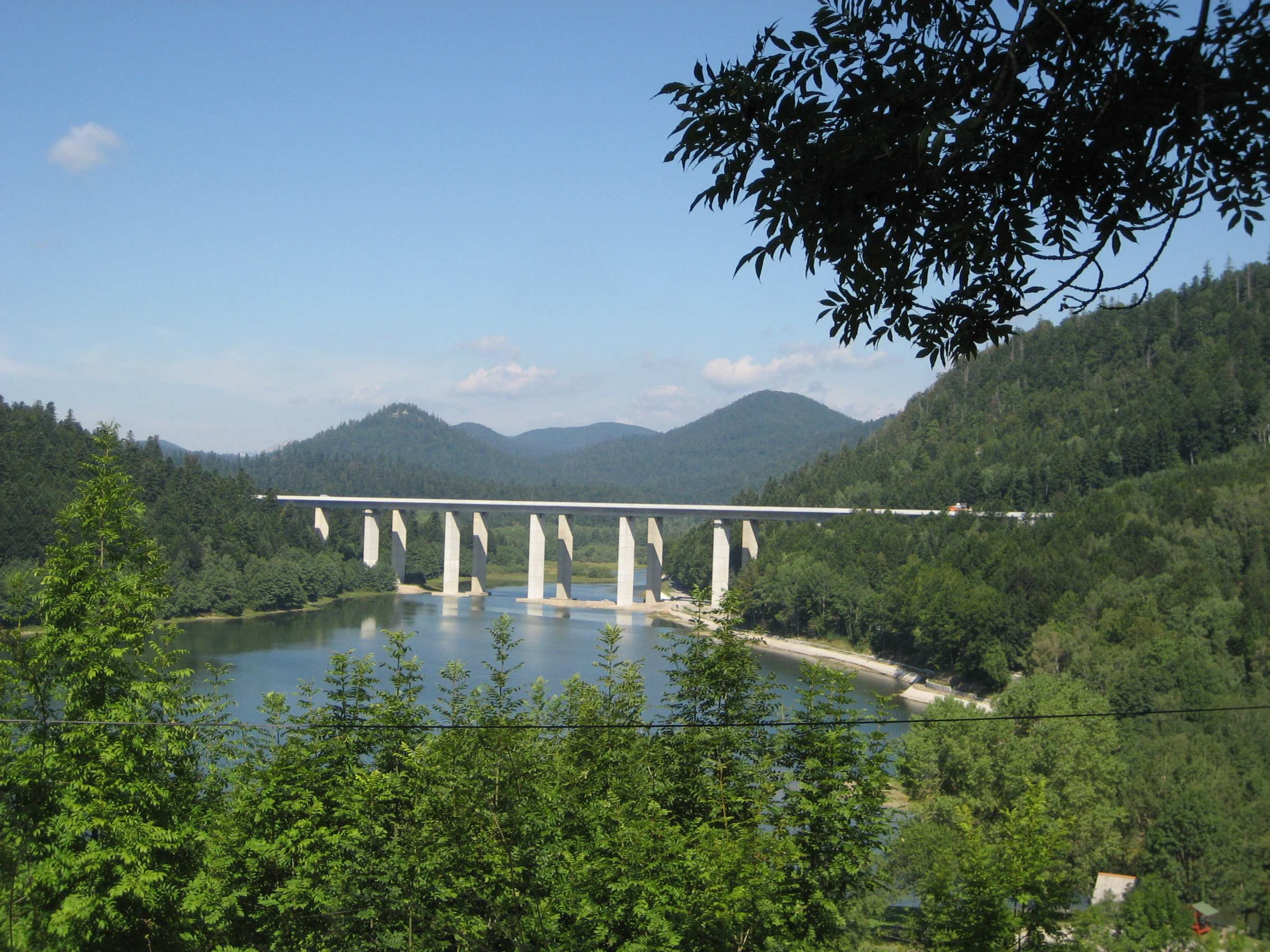
Bajer Bridge

As the A6 motorway route runs through mountainous terrain of Gorski Kotar, it comprises a substantial number of major structures—bridges, viaducts, tunnels, underpasses, flyovers, and culverts. Out of the total length of the Rijeka–Zagreb motorway of 146.5 kilometres (91.0 mi), 22.1 kilometres (13.7 mi) are situated within such structures. The northern part of the Rijeka–Zagreb motorway, designated as the A1 motorway, comprising 38.6 kilometres (24.0 mi) between Zagreb and Karlovac, contains only 572 metres (1,877 ft) of such structures as the section is situated in a plain. The 11.4 kilometres (7.1 mi) between Karlovac and Bosiljevo 2 interchanges, contains as much as 4,036 metres (13,241 ft) of the structures. Thus the A6 motorway has 17.5 kilometres (10.9 mi), or 21% of the route, located within such structures. The Rijeka–Zagreb motorway has a total of 24 viaducts, 13 tunnels, 5 bridges, 45 underpasses, and 26 flyovers. All of the bridges, viaducts, and tunnels on the A6 motorway have at least two driving lanes in each direction.

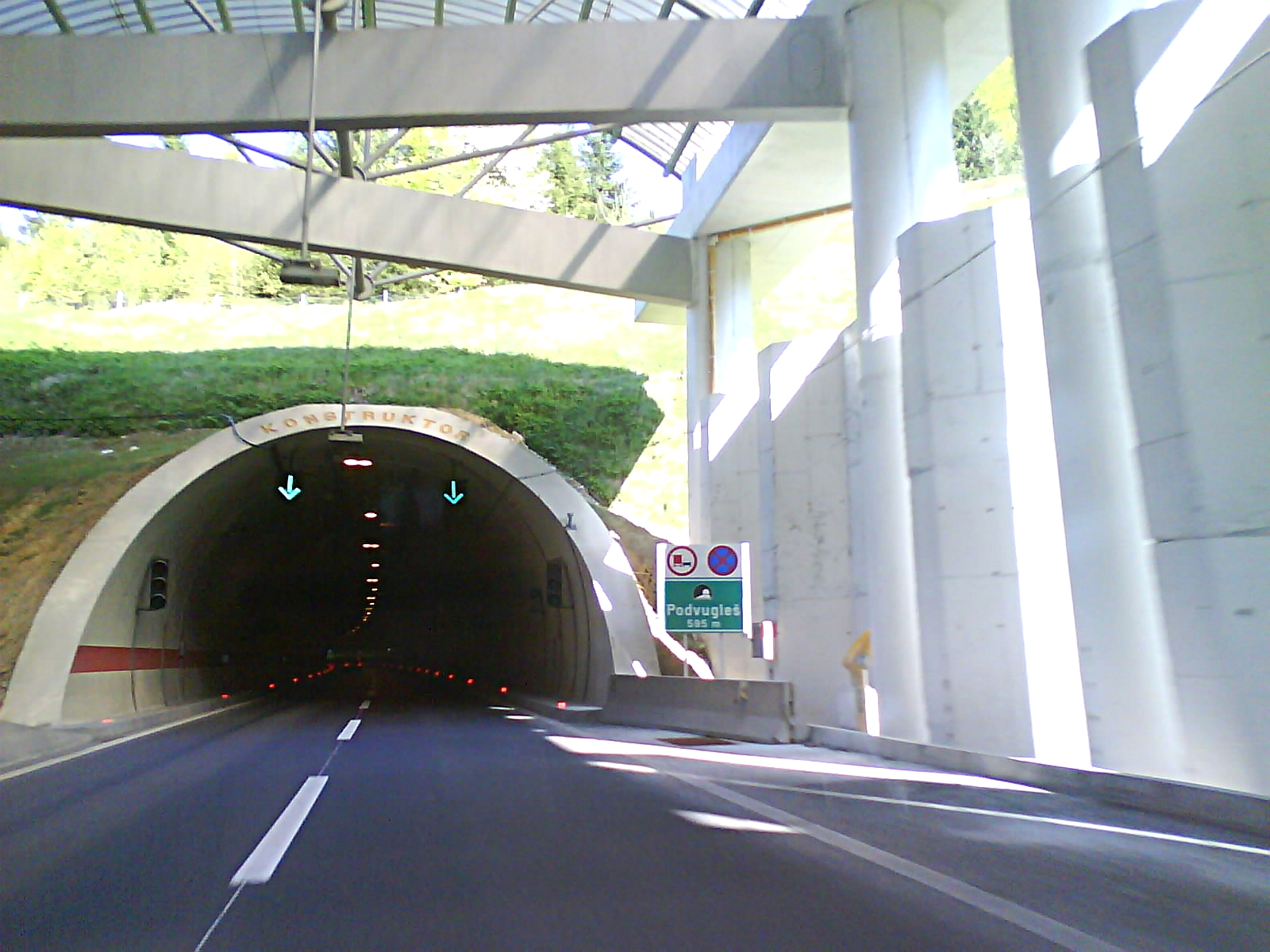
Podvugleš Tunnel

The longest tunnel on the A6 motorway route is the 2,143-metre (7,031 ft) Tuhobić Tunnel, located on the Oštrovica–Vrata section. The tunnel was initially opened as a single-tube tunnel in 1996. The second tunnel tube was excavated in August 2007 and opened to traffic in 2008. The European Tunnel Assessment Programme (EuroTAP), a tunnel safety assessment programme supported by the European Commission, coordinated by FIA and led by the German motoring club ADAC, tested Tuhobić Tunnel twice—once in 2004, when it achieved poor results, and again in 2009 after implementation of EuroTAP safety recommendations. The 2009 test ranked the tunnel as the second safest in Europe. An unusual feature associated with the A6 tunnels is the close proximity of the 1,490-metre (4,890 ft) Javorova Kosa and the 610-metre (2,000 ft) Podvugleš tunnels—they are separated by less than 60 metres (200 ft) of road. In order to prevent abrupt changes in road conditions caused by the weather, the distance between the tunnels is covered by translucent roofing. The tunnels are located on the Vrbovsko–Ravna Gora section. Other significant tunnels on the A6 motorway are the 1,130-metre (3,710 ft) Veliki Gložac and Vrata tunnels. While the former, as with all the other tunnels mentioned, is significant due to its length, the latter is notable for the large cavern encountered during its excavation.

The most significant bridges and viaducts on the A6 motorway route are the 485-metre (1,591 ft) Bajer Bridge spanning Lake Bajer near Fužine, on the Vrata–Oštrovica section, and the Zečeve Drage and Severinske Drage viaducts. The two viaducts are 924 metres (3,031 ft) and 725 metres (2,379 ft) long respectively. The remaining viaducts on the motorway that are longer than 500 metres (1,600 ft) are Hreljin and Golubinjak viaducts.

== History ==
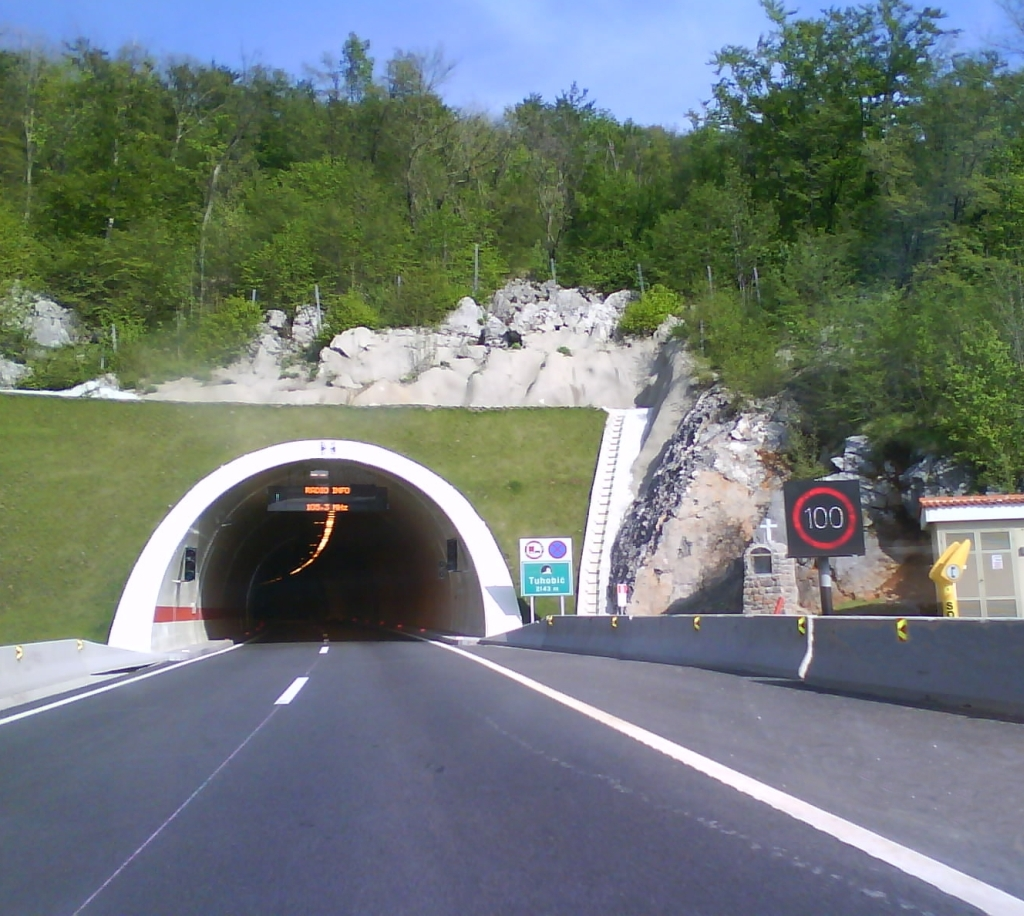
Tuhobić Tunnel, the longest tunnel on the A6 route

Transport links between Rijeka and Zagreb have always been of substantial importance because of the transport requirements of the Port of Rijeka. This was first recognised by the Habsburg Empire in 1728, when the Carolina road was completed, and again in 1780 when the road was modernized. The original Rijeka–Zagreb road was replaced in 1811 by a new route, the Louisiana road, in order to avoid the steep sections of its predecessor. The new road remained the primary transport link to Rijeka until 1873, when the first railroad to the city was built. Further development of the port and industry in Rijeka and Zagreb required a more efficient road, which was built in 1954. That road was to remain the principal road transport link between the two cities for decades.

Zagreb–Rijeka motorway, of which the A6 motorway is a part, was one of three routes defined in 1971 as priority transport routes of Yugoslavia that were to be developed as motorways. The first section of the A6 motorway, between Orehovica and Kikovica, was 10.5 km (6.5 mi) long and opened on September 9, 1972. The section was also the first six-lane motorway built in Yugoslavia. The 39.3-kilometre (24.4 mi) long Zagreb–Karlovac section, now designated the A1 motorway, was completed on December 29, 1972. Further construction was suspended for the following 25 years, as a political decision had been made by the Yugoslav leadership to withdraw funding for the construction. The funds were instead allocated to the construction of a motorway that would travel between Ljubljana, Zagreb, Belgrade, and Skopje, then known as the Brotherhood and Unity Highway. The Croatian section of the highway later became the A3 motorway. After the breakup of Yugoslavia, construction of the Rijeka–Zagreb motorway was still on hold due to the Croatian War of Independence, and no further construction took place until 1996. The sole exception to the 25-year-long hiatus was the 7.25-kilometre (4.50 mi) long Kikovica–Oštrovica section, which was originally executed as an expressway and opened in 1982.

In 1996, construction of the A6 motorway resumed, and in 1997, a further 30 km (19 mi) of expressway between Oštrovica and Kupjak was completed. In December 1997, the government of the Republic of Croatia founded the Autocesta Rijeka–Zagreb company and tasked it with operating the completed sections of motorway and the construction of the remainder of the route. The new motorway operator resumed construction in three stages. During the first stage, 60.18 km (37.39 mi) of expressway between Kupjak and Karlovac were completed by the end of June 2004, comprising 60.18 kilometres (37.39 mi) of motorway and semi-motorway. In the second stage, the expressway was upgraded to a full motorway by the end of October 2008. This stage required additional construction along 55.57 kilometres (34.53 mi) of the route. The upgraded motorway was officially opened on October 22, 2008, by Prime Minister Ivo Sanader at a ceremony held at the southern portal of Tuhobić Tunnel. The opening ceremony coincided with opening of a new bridge over the river Mura on the border between Croatia and Hungary, connecting the A4 to the Hungarian M7 motorway. Thus the route spanning Budapest–Zagreb–Rijeka was completed as a modern motorway. Construction costs incurred are estimated at 661.5 million euros. Even though Hrvatske autoceste normally develops motorways in Croatia, the A6 motorway is operated and maintained by Autocesta Rijeka–Zagreb.

From 31 January to 2 February 2014, while S and SW geostrophic wind dominated, freezing rain fell on Gorski Kotar, glazing the entire region. It wrecked roofs, power lines an forests, causing power loss for about 14,000 households in Gorski Kotar, or about 80% of its population. Because of power lines falling on the A6, the highway was closed in of Rijeka between Bosiljevo and Kikovica, and between Kikovica and Delnice in the direction of Zagreb.

== Traffic volume ==
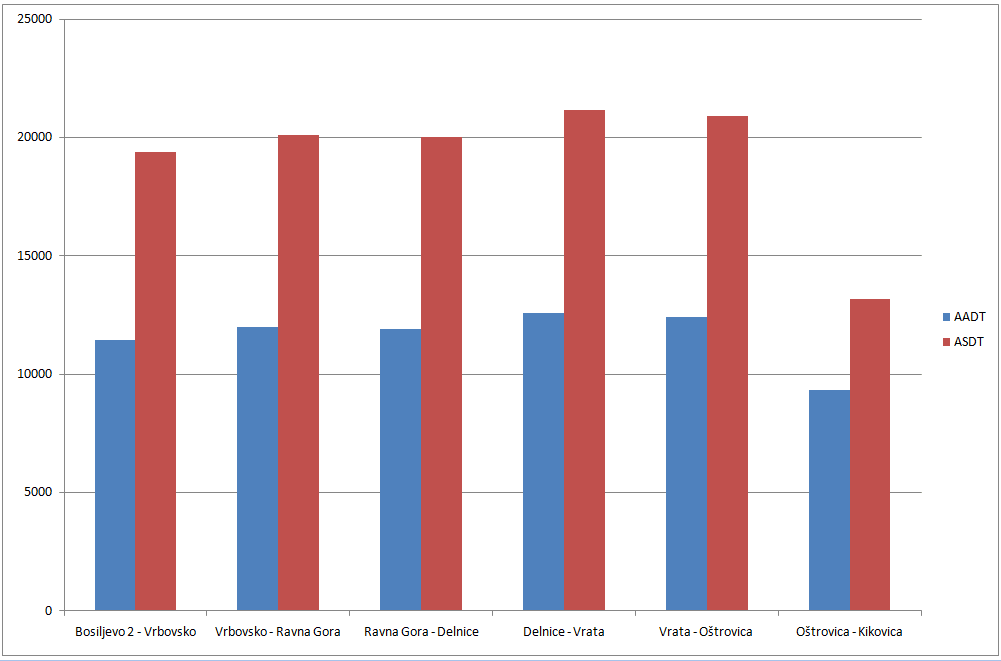
Traffic volume measured on the A6 motorway (2009)

Traffic is regularly counted by means of a traffic census at toll stations and reported by Autocesta Rijeka–Zagreb, the operator of the motorway, and published by Hrvatske ceste. The reported traffic volume exhibits no significant variations as the motorway chainage increases, and as it passes by various major destinations and the interchanges that serve them, except at the Vrata interchange, where traffic to and from Krk Island, Crikvenica, and Novi Vinodolski flows. The greatest volume of traffic is registered between Delnice and Vrata interchanges—with a 12,600-vehicle annual average daily traffic (AADT), and a 21,150-vehicle average summer daily traffic (ASDT) figure. Sections south of Kikovica interchange likely carry substantial traffic volume as they serve Rijeka commuter traffic as well as the volume registered between the Oštrovica and Kikovica interchanges. However, no traffic volume figures are published for those sections, since motorway traffic is counted by means of toll ticket sales analyses, and the sections south of Kikovica interchange are not tolled.

Substantial variations observed between AADT and ASDT are normally attributed to the fact that the motorway carries significant tourist traffic to Istria and Kvarner Gulf. The seasonal increase in traffic volume ranges from 41% on the Oštrovica–Kikovica section to 69% as measured on the Bosiljevo 2–Vrbovsko section. The average summer-season traffic volume increase on the motorway is 65%.

A6 traffic volume details
Road	Counting site	AADT	ASDT	Notes
A6	3022 Bosiljevo 2 west	11,448	19,401	Between Bosiljevo 2 and Vrbovsko interchanges
A6	3006 Vrbovsko west	11,979	20,091	Between Vrbovsko and Ravna Gora interchanges
A6	2906 Ravna Gora west	11,900	20,004	Between Ravna Gora and Delnice interchanges
A6	2910 Delnice west	12,600	21,150	Between Delnice and Vrata interchanges
A6	2915 Vrata west	12,413	20,891	Between Vrata and Oštrovica interchanges
A6	2933 Oštrovica west	9,324	13,168	Between Oštrovica and Kikovica interchanges

== Rest areas ==
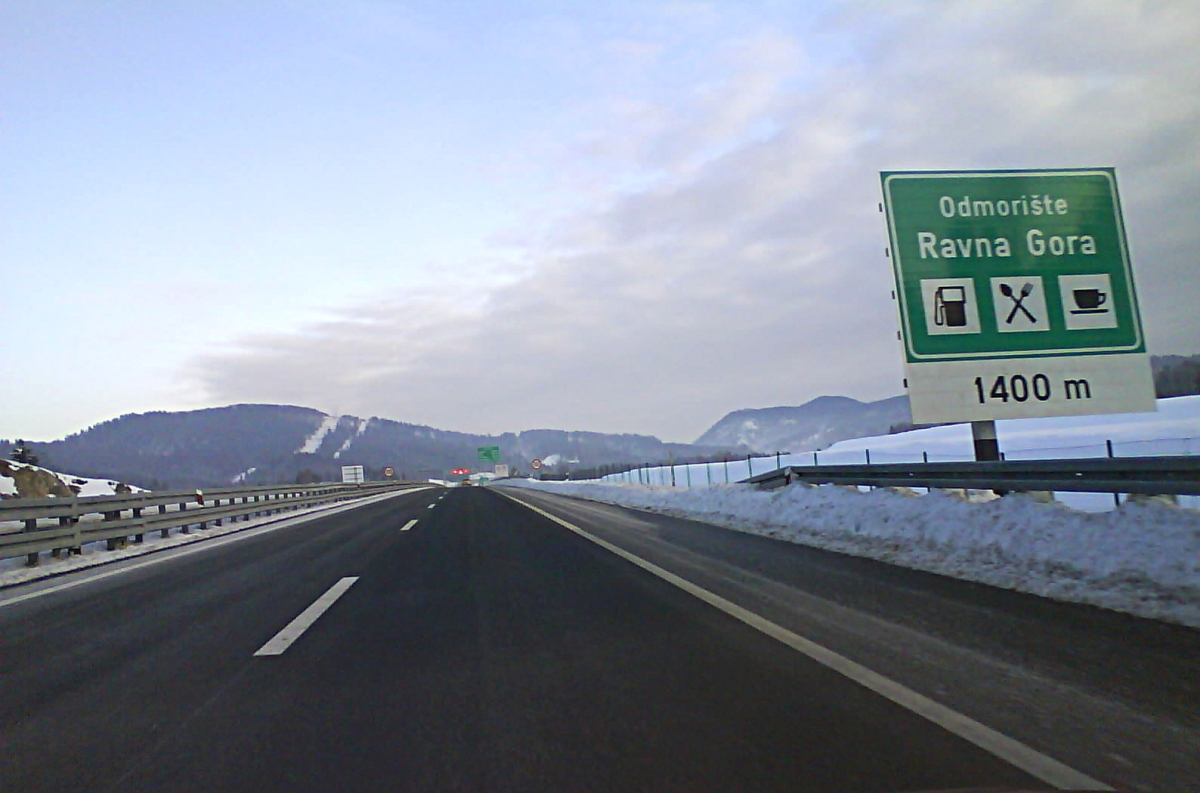
Approach to the Ravna Gora rest area

As of October 2010, there are four rest areas operating along the A6 motorway, as a new rest area opened on October 9, 2010, next to the western portal of Tuhobić Tunnel on the Vrata–Oštrovica section of the route. Applicable legislation provides for four types of rest areas designated as types A through D: A-type rest areas comprise a full range of amenities including a filling station, a restaurant and a hotel or a motel; B-type rest areas have no lodging; C-type rest areas are very common and include a filling station and a café, but no restaurants or accommodations; and D-type rest areas offer parking spaces only, with possibly some picnic tables, benches, and restrooms. Even though the rest areas found along the A6 motorway generally follow this ranking system, there are considerable variations, as some of them offer extra services. The most notable example is Lepenica rest area—even though it has no restaurant and therefore falls below B-type rest area standard, there is, for instance, an RV park available. The filling stations typically have small convenience stores and some of them offer LPG fuel. As of October 2010, all of the rest areas found along the A6 motorway comply with C-type rest area standards or above.

The primary motorway operator, Autocesta Rijeka–Zagreb, leases the rest areas to various operators through public tenders. As of October 2010, there are three such rest area operators on the A1 motorway: INA, OMV and Tifon. The rest area operators are not permitted to sub-lease the fuel operations; the Tifon-operated rest area has a restaurant and a hotel operated by Marché, a Mövenpick Hotels & Resorts subsidiary, but they are also penalized if some facilities required by the lease contract are not operating. All of the A6 motorway rest areas, except Ravna Gora, are accessible from one of the directions of the motorway traffic only. The rest areas normally operate 24 hours a day, seven days a week.

List of A6 motorway rest areas
County	km	Name	Operators	Notes
Primorje-Gorski Kotar	28.8	Kupjak	Tifon; Marché	Facilities found at Ravna Gora rest area comprise a filling station selling petrol, diesel fuel and LPG, a café, a restaurant, a hotel, free wireless network access, showers, and restrooms. The hotel and the restaurant are operated by Marché.
Primorje-Gorski Kotar	56.3	Lepenica	INA	Facilities found at Lepenica rest area comprise a filling station selling petrol and diesel fuel, a café, an RV park, and restrooms. Accessible to traffic directed to Rijeka only
Primorje-Gorski Kotar	59.0	Tuhobić	Crodux	As of October 2010, facilities found at Tuhobić rest area comprise a filling station selling petrol, diesel fuel and LPG. A restaurant is expected to open at the rest area in near future. Accessible to traffic directed to Zagreb only.
Primorje-Gorski Kotar	74.5	Cernik	INA; Petrol	Facilities found at Cernik-Čavle rest area comprise a filling station selling petrol and diesel fuel and restrooms. Accessible to traffic directed to Zagreb only
1.000 mi = 1.609 km; 1.000 km = 0.621 mi: Incomplete access

== Exit list ==
County	km	Exit	Name	Destination	Notes
Karlovac	0.0	1	Bosiljevo 2	A1 E65	Connection to the A1 motorway in Bosiljevo 2 interchange The northern terminus of European route E65 concurrency The northern terminus of the motorway
Primorje-Gorski Kotar	4.4	Severinske Drage Viaduct			
Primorje-Gorski Kotar	9.0	Veliki Gložac Tunnel			
Primorje-Gorski Kotar	11.9	Zečeve Drage Viaduct			
Primorje-Gorski Kotar	15.8	2	Vrbovsko	D42	Connection to Vrbovsko via the D42 state road
Primorje-Gorski Kotar	16.1	Dobra Bridge			
Primorje-Gorski Kotar	17.5	Kamačnik Bridge			
Primorje-Gorski Kotar	26.5	Podvugleš Tunnel			
Primorje-Gorski Kotar	27.7	Javorova Kosa Tunnel			
Primorje-Gorski Kotar	28.8	Rest area traffic sign	Kupjak rest area		
Primorje-Gorski Kotar	30.9	3	Ravna Gora	Ž5034	Connection to Ravna Gora and Kupjak
Primorje-Gorski Kotar	42.0	4	Delnice	D3	Connection to Delnice, Mrkopalj, and Risnjak National Park
Primorje-Gorski Kotar	45.2	Golubinjak Viaduct			
Primorje-Gorski Kotar	50.6	5	Vrata	Ž5068	Connection to Vrata, Fužine, and Lake Bajer
Primorje-Gorski Kotar	51.9	Bajer Bridge			
Primorje-Gorski Kotar	56.3	Rest area traffic sign	Lepenica rest area		Accessible to southbound traffic only
Primorje-Gorski Kotar	57.6	Tuhobić Tunnel			
Primorje-Gorski Kotar	59.0	Rest area traffic sign	Tuhobić rest area		Accessible to northbound traffic only
Primorje-Gorski Kotar	59.8	Hreljin Viaduct			
Primorje-Gorski Kotar	61.7	6	Oštrovica	D501	Connection to Crikvenica, Kraljevica, and Krk island via Križišće
Primorje-Gorski Kotar	70.1	Toll plaza traffic sign	Grobnik toll plaza		
Primorje-Gorski Kotar	70.4	7	Kikovica	D3	Connection to Automotodrom Grobnik
Primorje-Gorski Kotar	74.5	Rest area traffic sign	Cernik-Čavle rest area		Accessible to northbound traffic only
Primorje-Gorski Kotar	75.6	8	Čavle	D40	Connection to Čavle, Kukuljanovo, and Bakar
Primorje-Gorski Kotar	80.2	9	Orehovica	A7 E61 E65 Ž5054	Connection to the A7 motorway in Orehovica interchange and to Rijeka via Rijeka bypass section of the A7; Connection to Rijeka via Ž5054 (exit only); The southern terminus of European route E65 concurrency The southern terminus of the motorway
1.000 mi = 1.609 km; 1.000 km = 0.621 mi: Concurrency terminus; Incomplete access

== See also ==
- International E-road network
- Transport in Croatia
