= Viadukt =

Viadukt d.d.
- Type: Joint-stock company
- Traded as: ZSE: VDKT
- Industry: Civil engineering
- Founded: 1947
- Headquarters: Zagreb, Croatia
- Key people: Joško Mikulić
- Website: www.viadukt.hr

Viadukt is a Croatian civil engineering company, specialised in the areas of bridge, tunnel and road engineering. Other business activities of the company include construction and reconstruction of urban streets.

The most significant works performed by the company include: significant sections of the A1, A3 and A5 motorways, a number of motorway viaducts, including Osojnik, Draga, Zečeve Drage, Dobra, Drežnik, Limska Draga etc., as well as Bajer Bridge (a part of the A6 motorway) and Sava River Bridge (a part of the A2 motorway). The company is also employed for execution of the construction works at the Pelješac Bridge. Also, the company has executed a number of significant tunnels, including Tuhobić Tunnel, the longest tunnel on the A6 motorway.

Share capital of the company is 137,043,900.00 Croatian kuna and 456,813 shares of the company have been issued. The company is listed at Zagreb Stock Exchange and included in its CROBEX index. Chairman of the board of the company is Joško Mikulić while vice-chairman position is held by Ivan Berket. The remaining member of the managing board is Damir Kezele.
