= Konstruktor-Split =

Croatian construction company

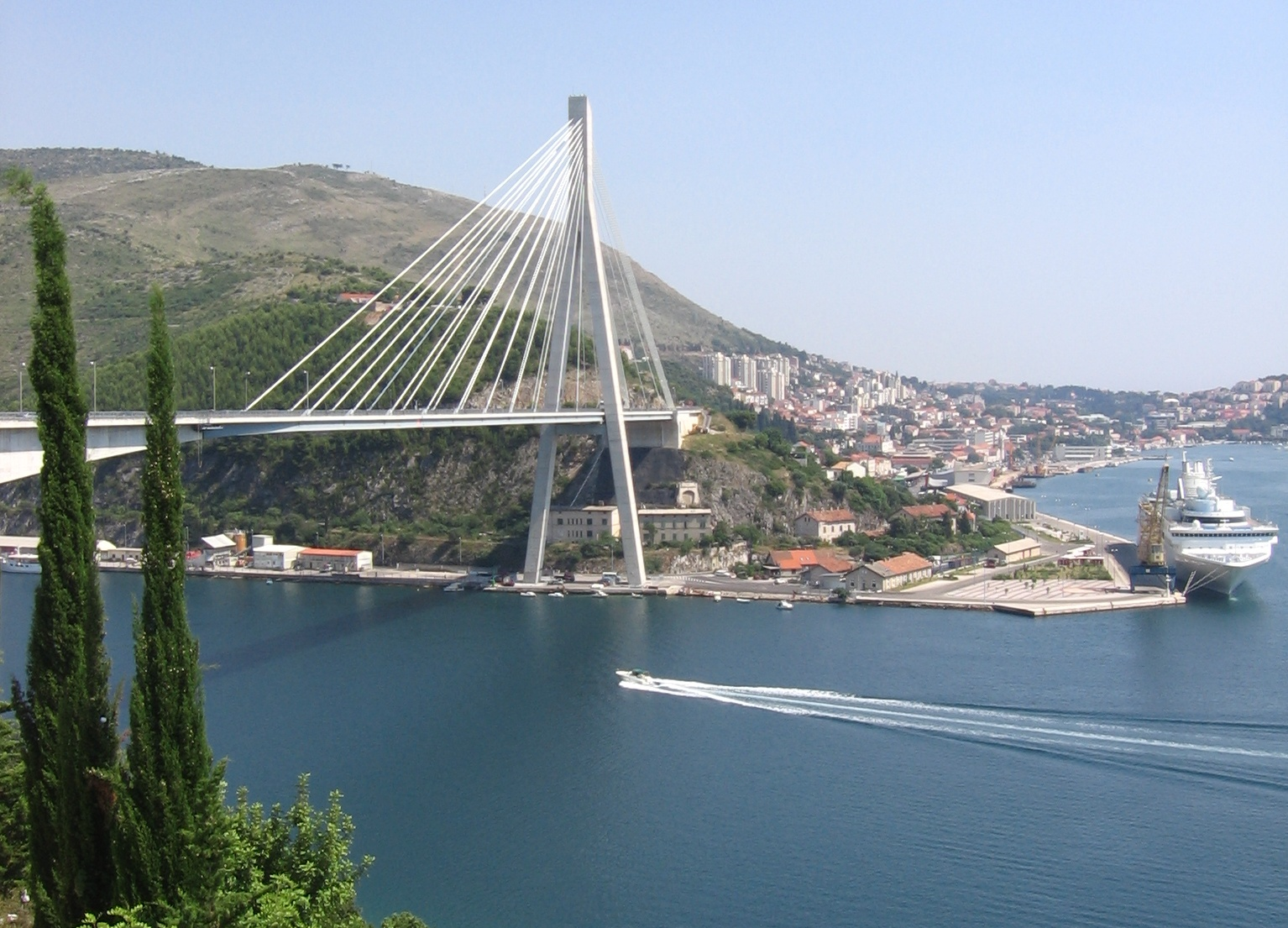
Franjo Tuđman Bridge built by Konstruktor and Walter Bau AG near Dubrovnik.

Logo.

Konstruktor inženjering d.d. is a Croatian construction company which was founded in 1945 as "Konstruktor-Split" in Split, Yugoslavia (today's Croatia).

Konstruktor was the first construction company in Dalmatia. Since 2006 Konstruktor inženjering d.d. is a holder of ISO 9001:2000 Certificate.

== See also ==
- List of companies of the Socialist Federal Republic of Yugoslavia
