= Bosiljevo 2 interchange =

Road interchange in Croatia

- Croatian: Čvor Bosiljevo 2
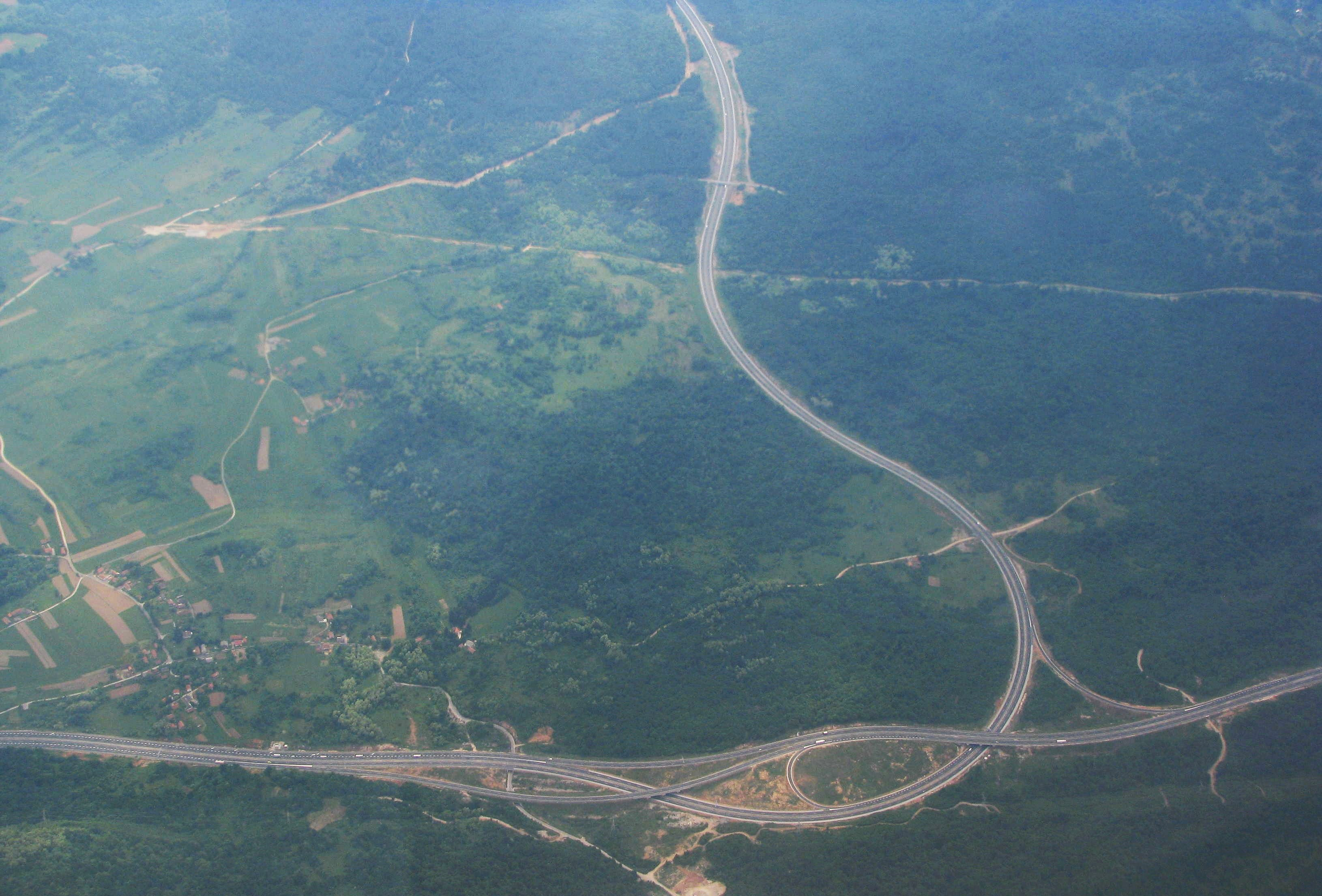
- View from the north; the left-to-top road is A1 and the road on the right is A6

Location
- Bosiljevo, southwest of Karlovac, Croatia
- Coordinates: 45.408054°N 15.256995°E
- Roads at junction: A1 / E71 A6 / E65

Construction
- Type: Trumpet interchange

The Bosiljevo 2 interchange (Croatian: Čvor Bosiljevo 2) is a trumpet interchange southwest of Karlovac, Croatia, near the eponymous village. The interchange is the northern terminus of the A6 motorway and it connects the A6 route to the A1 motorway between Bosiljevo 1 and Ogulin exits. The interchange is a part of Pan-European corridor Vb. It also represents junction of European routes E65 and E71.

== See also ==
- Lučko interchange
- Orehovica interchange
- International E-road network
- Transport in Croatia
