= Vrata, Primorje-Gorski Kotar County =

Vrata
- Village
- Location within Croatia
- Coordinates: 45°19′7″N 14°43′53″E
- Country: Croatia
- Region: Gorski Kotar
- County: Primorje-Gorski Kotar County
- Municipality: Fužine

Area
  - Total: 9.1 km^{2} (3.5 sq mi)
- Elevation: 770 m (2,530 ft)

Population (2021)
  - Total: 210
  - Density: 23/km^{2} (60/sq mi)
- Time zone: UTC+1 (CET)
  - Summer (DST): UTC+2 (CEST)
- Postal code: 51321
- Area code: 051

Vrata is a village in Primorje-Gorski Kotar County, Croatia. The village is administered as a part of Fužine municipality. According to the national census of 2011 the population of the village is 287.

== History ==
The volunteer fire department DVD Vrata was founded in 1953, and is today part of the VZ općine Fužine. Its current commander is Tomislav Frković.

From 31 January to 2 February 2014, while S and SW geostrophic wind dominated, freezing rain fell on Gorski Kotar, glazing the entire region. It wrecked roofs, power lines and forests, causing power loss for about 14,000 households in Gorski Kotar, or about 80% of its population. Because of power lines falling on the A6, the highway was closed in of Rijeka between Bosiljevo and Kikovica, and between Kikovica and Delnice in the direction of Zagreb. It took about 10 days to restore essential infrastructure to the region, and within months electricity was back in most of its former range, but at a cost of about 84.4 million HRK to HEP. At the time it was the largest peacetime damage since its Secession from Yugoslavia, even without counting the forestry losses. Clearing blocked forestry roads and forest paths would take years, and thanks to the declining population some were never cleared.

== Economy ==
There was a sawmill in Vrata.

== Sports ==
Beginning in 2013, the 7 stage 260 kilometres (160 mi) long Cycling Trail of Gorski Kotar (Croatian: Goranska biciklistička transverzala) passes through Vrata.

The "Gorski Kotar Bike Tour", held annually since 2012, sometimes goes through Vrata, such as in the first leg for 2022 and the first leg for 2023.
