= Kvarner Gulf =

Bay in the northern Adriatic Sea

Coordinates: 44°54′N 14°36′E

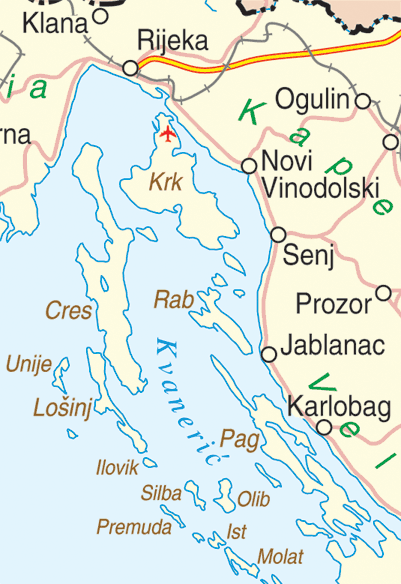
Map of the Kvarner Gulf

The Kvarner Gulf sometimes also Kvarner Bay, is a bay in the northern Adriatic Sea, located between the Istrian peninsula and the northern Croatian Littoral mainland. The bay is a part of Croatia's internal waters.

The largest islands within the Kvarner are Cres, Krk, Pag, Rab and Lošinj. A portion of the Kvarner Bay, located between Cres, Krk, Rab and Pag is also called Kvarnerić (literally "little Kvarner"; Italian: Golfo del Quarnerolo or Carnerolo), and the portion east of Krk and Rab is called Senj Channel (after the mainland town of Senj).

The bay is notable for its depth (more than 100 meters), which allows for the city of Rijeka at its northernmost point to have a sea port that can accommodate Capesize ships.

== Environment ==
The bay is home to many beaches and tourist locations because of its beautiful waters and warm climate.

=== Important Bird Area ===
Collectively, the islands of the Kvarner Gulf form the Kvarner Islands Important Bird Area (IBA), designated as such by BirdLife International because it supports significant numbers of many bird species, including breeding populations of several birds of prey.

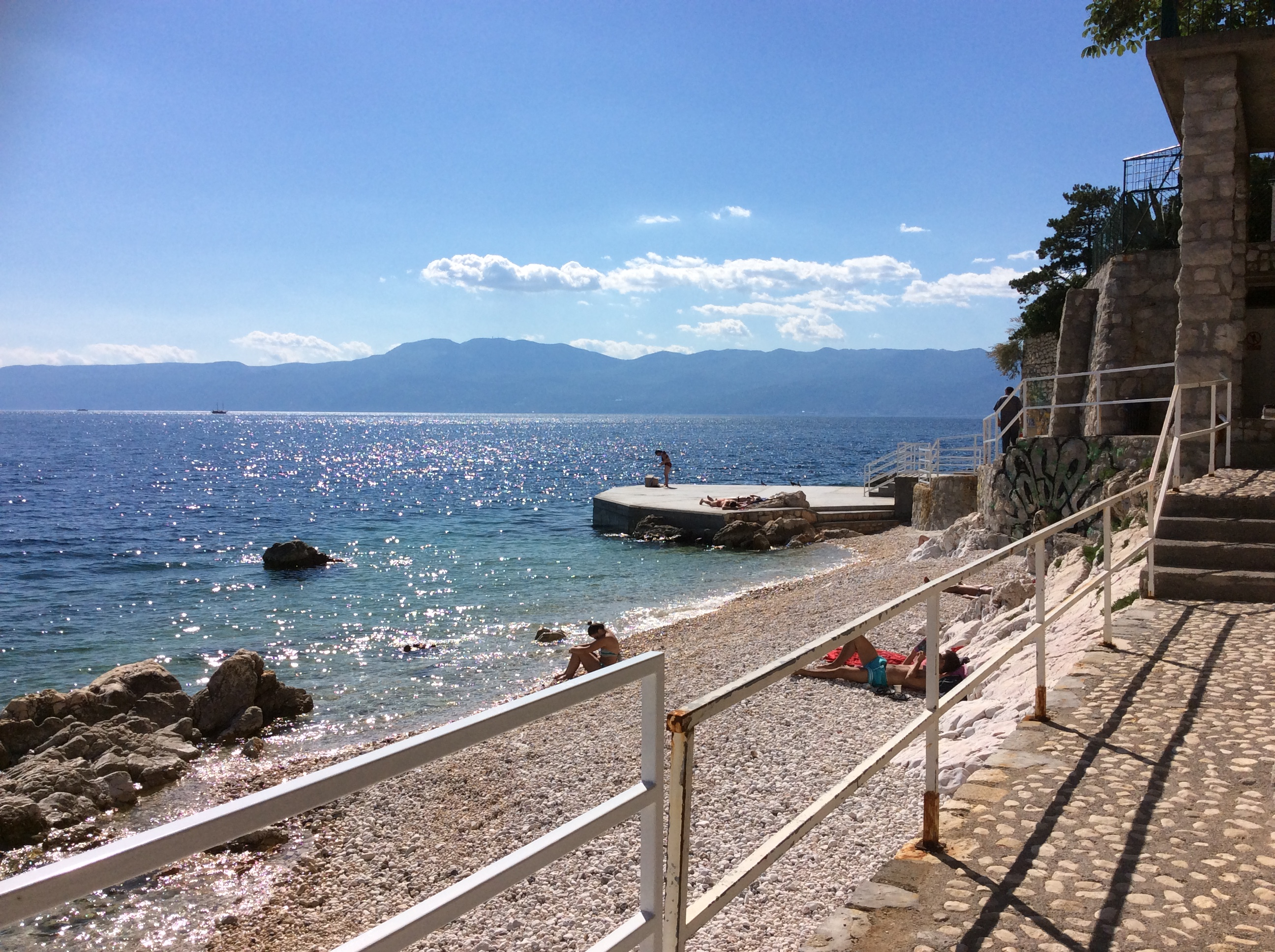
Pećine pebble beach with view of the Kvarner Bay

== See also ==
- Geography of Croatia

== Sources ==
=== General ===
- "Kvarner (Kvarnerski zaljev)". Istrapedia (in Croatian).

=== Folkloristics ===
- Banov-Depope, Estela (2011). "Interkulturni aspekti usmenih balada i poezije Kvarnera". Zvuci i znaci: Interkulturalne i intermedijalne kroatističke studije [Intecultural Aspects of the Oral Balads and Poetry of the Kvarner] (in Serbo-Croatian). pp. 69–92. ISBN 978-953-7534-72-1.
