= Autocesta Rijeka – Zagreb =

Croatian company

Autocesta Rijeka - Zagreb d.d.
- Company type: State-owned joint-stock company
- Industry: Road transport
- Founded: January 26, 1998 in Zagreb, Croatia
- Defunct: December 31, 2020 in Zagreb, Croatia
- Fate: acquired by Hrvatske Autoceste
- Headquarters: Zagreb, Croatia
- Owner: Republic of Croatia
- Website: www.arz.hr

Autocesta Rijeka – Zagreb (English: Rijeka - Zagreb Motorway) was a Croatian state-owned joint-stock company founded pursuant to decision of the government of the Republic of Croatia of December 11, 1997, to facilitate construction and subsequent management of a motorway between Rijeka and Zagreb.

The company started operating on March 15, 1998. The company issued 21,520 shares, nominally valued at 100,000.00 Croatian kuna each. All company stocks are owned by the Republic of Croatia.

The company was granted the motorway management concession for a period of 28 years, which has subsequently been expanded to include not only the A6 motorway and some sections of the A1 motorway, but also the A7 motorway and the Krk Bridge on the D102 state road. The expansion of the concession also included extension of the concession period to 32 years and 11 months.

The company managed the following routes before January 1st 2021:

Number	Controlled Routes
A1	Bosiljevo (A6) - Lučko (A3)
A6	Bosiljevo (A1) - Rijeka
A7	Rupa border checkpoint - Rijeka (A6) - Sveti Kuzam - Križišće
D102	Krk Bridge (maintenance and bridge toll collection)

In 2018, the company became managed by a supervisory board.

On 21 May 2020, the Croatian Government announced that the company be incorporated into Hrvatske autoceste.

The company was acquired by Hrvatske autoceste and ceased to exist on midnight of January 1st 2021. All previously managed routes are now managed by the acquirer.

== See also ==
- Highways in Croatia
- Hrvatske autoceste
- Hrvatske ceste
