= Ticket system =

Method of collecting tolls on highways

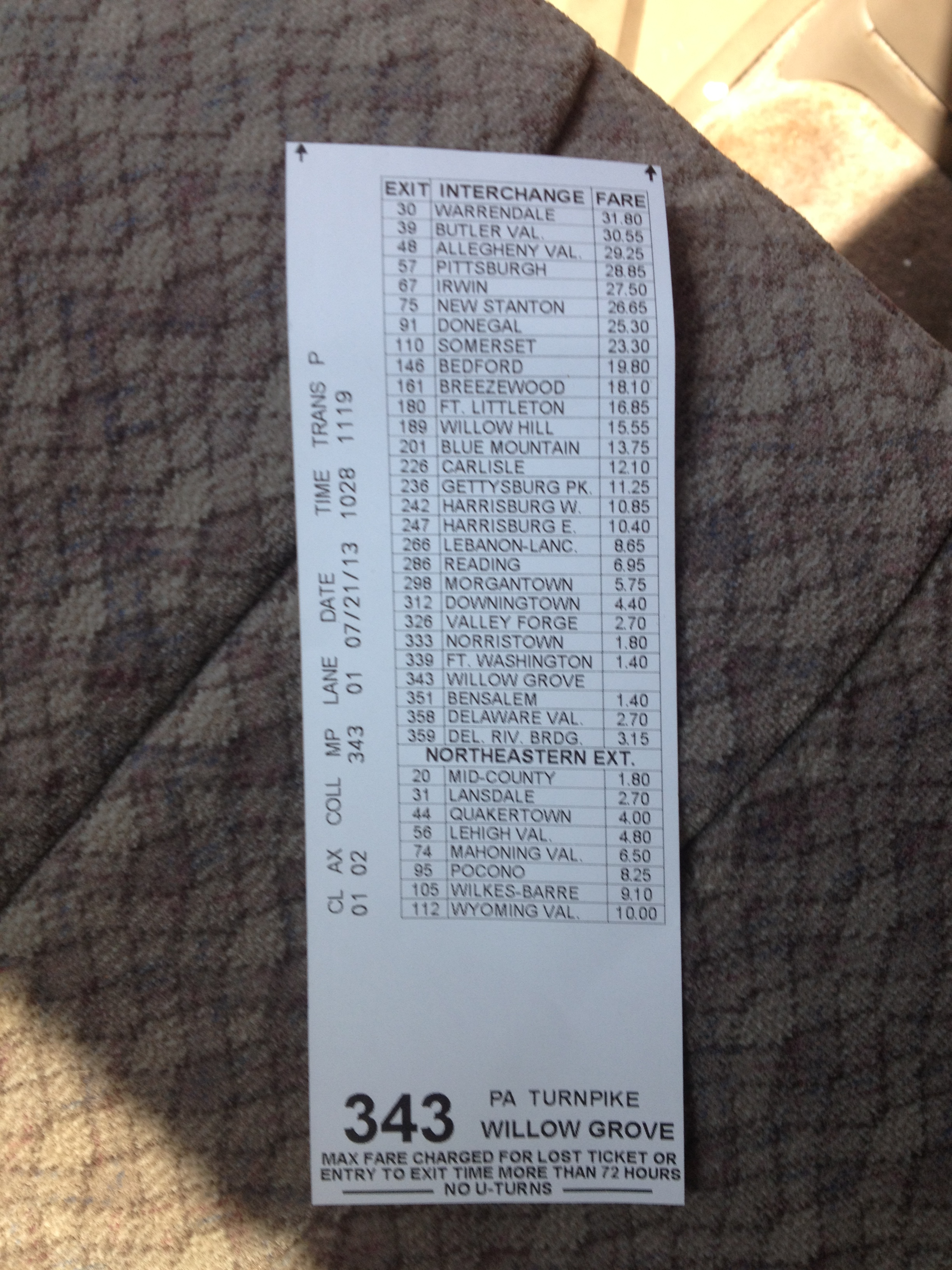
A toll ticket formerly used on the Pennsylvania Turnpike

A ticket system, also known as a closed toll collection system, is a system used on some toll roads in which a user pays a toll rate based on the distance traveled from their originating entrance to their destination exit.

The correct toll is determined by requiring all users to take a ticket from a machine or from an attendant when entering the system. The ticket prominently displays the location (or exit number) from which it was issued and may contain a precomputed chart of toll rates for each exit. Upon arrival at the toll booth at the destination exit, the user presents the ticket to the toll collector, who determines the correct toll and demands payment. If no ticket is presented (i.e. the ticket is lost), generally the highest possible toll is charged. For this kind of system to work, toll plazas must be built and staffed at all entrances and exits to the toll road (hence the "closed" name). Most ticket-based toll roads today use an electronic toll collection system as an alternative. In this case, sensors at both the entry and exit toll plazas read the vehicle's transponder and the correct toll is deducted from the user's account; no ticket is necessary.

First employed on the Pennsylvania Turnpike when it opened in 1940, the ticket system has been utilized on lengthy toll highways in which the exits are spread out over a distance on an average of 7 to 10 miles (11 to 16 km) per exit.

== Highways where used ==
- New Jersey Turnpike—entire length, including Newark Bay Extension and Pearl Harbor Extension
- Ohio Turnpike—between Swanton Toll Barrier and Newton Falls Toll Barrier
- Indiana Toll Road—between Portage Toll Plaza and Eastpoint Toll Plaza

== Highways that formerly used the ticket system ==
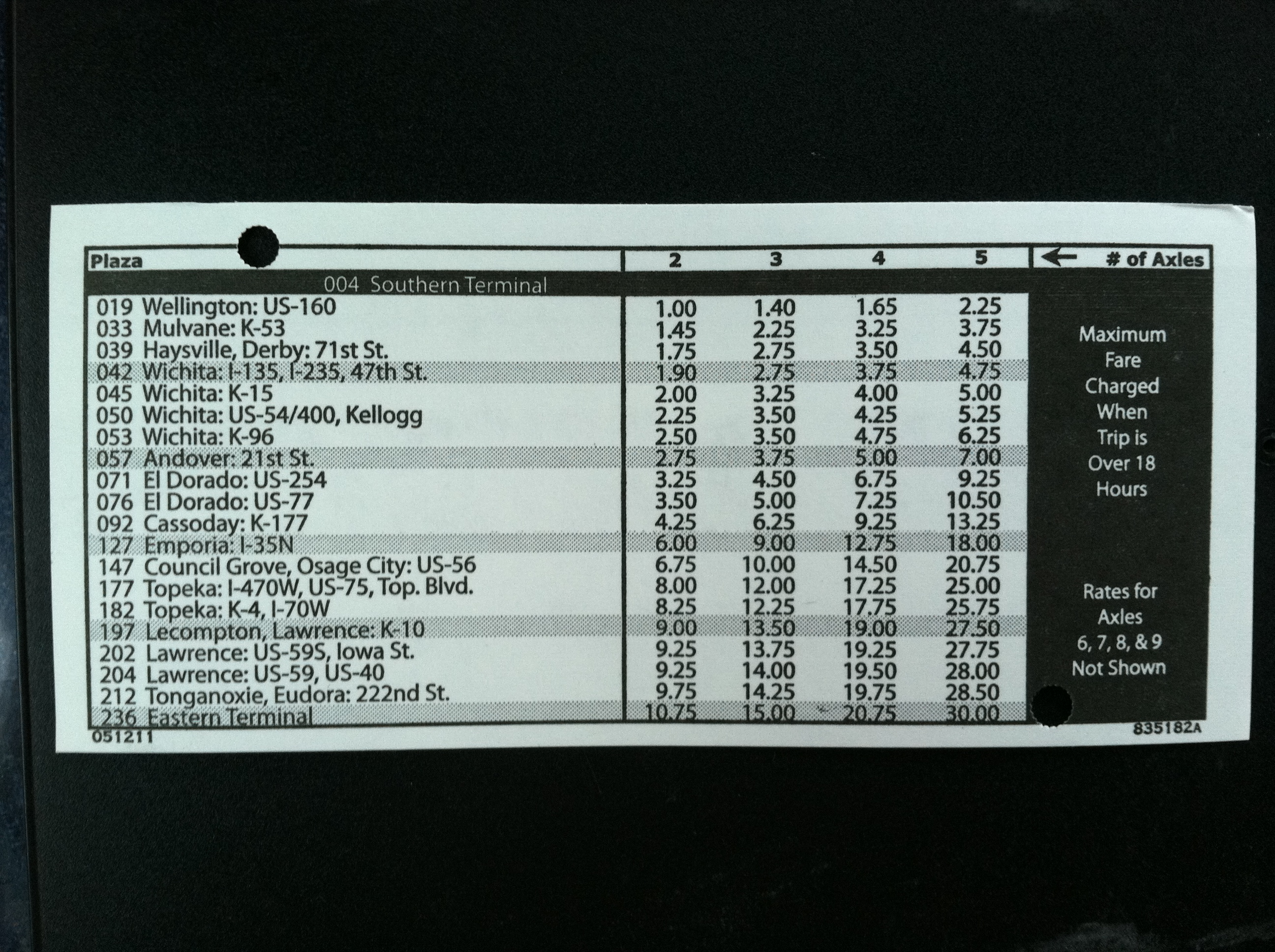
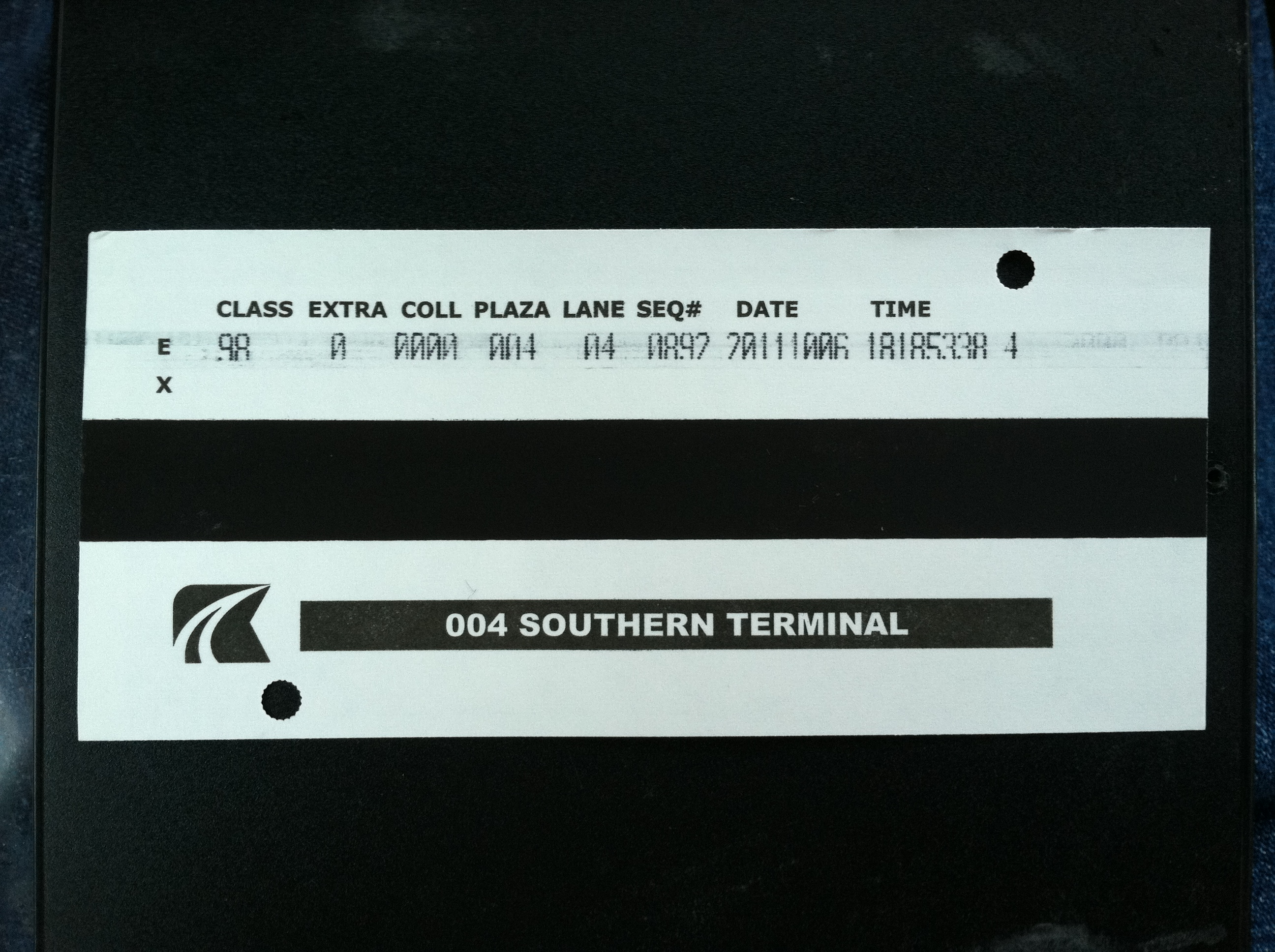
The front and back of a ticket from the Kansas Turnpike, issued at the Southern Terminal on October 6, 2011.
- Maine Turnpike—between York Toll Plaza and New Gloucester Toll Plaza (replaced by fixed-point barrier system in late-1990s)
- Massachusetts Turnpike—between West Stockbridge and Weston (replaced by open road tolling in October 2016)
- New York State Thruway—between Ripley Toll Plaza and West Seneca Toll Plaza west of Buffalo, and between Williamsville Toll Plaza and Woodbury Toll Plaza east of Buffalo on the mainline, and the Berkshire Connector (replaced by open road tolling in November 2020)
- Pennsylvania Turnpike—mainline between Warrendale and Neshaminy Falls, and Northeast Extension between Mid-County and Wyoming Valley (replaced by open road tolling in March 2020)
- Illinois Tollway (Northwest Tollway (now Jane Addams Tollway) - between Elgin Toll Plaza and South Beloit Toll Plaza (replaced by fixed-toll barriers in late-1970s)
- West Virginia Turnpike–entire length (replaced by fixed-point toll barrier system in late-1980s)
- A1 motorway (Slovenia)—between Ljubljana and Koper (replaced by vignette in 2008)
- Florida's Turnpike—between Lantana Toll Plaza and Three Lakes Toll Plaza; replaced with all-electronic tolling in November 2021
- Kansas Turnpike—entire length; replaced with all-electronic tolling on July 1, 2024
- Turner Turnpike and Will Rogers Turnpike in Oklahoma—both used a modified ticket-based toll collection system that placed only one mainline toll plaza on the highway, roughly halfway through the length of the road. Under this system, traffic exiting before reaching the mainline toll plaza paid at the exit. Also, traffic entering at said interchange heading away from the mainline toll plaza paid before entering the highway, but traffic entering heading toward the mainline toll plaza received a ticket. Traffic heading away from the mainline toll plaza that exited before reaching the end of the toll road turned in their receipt they received when paying their toll and received a refund for the unused portion of the toll roads; replaced with all-electronic tolling in November 2024.

== See also ==
- Electronic ticket
