= Dubovik =

Dubovik may refer to:

== Places ==
- Donji Dubovik (disambiguation)
- Gornji Dubovik, a village in the municipality of Višegrad, Bosnia and Herzegovina
- Mali Dubovik, a village in Krupa na Uni in Bosnia and Herzegovina
- Srednji Dubovik, a municipality of Bosanska Krupa, Bosnia and Herzegovina
- Srednji Dubovik, Krupa na Uni, a village in the municipality of Krupa na Uni in Bosnia and Herzegovina
- Veliki Dubovik, a municipality of Bosanska Krupa, Bosnia and Herzegovina
- Veliki Dubovik, Krupa na Uni, a village in the municipality of Krupa na Uni, Bosnia and Herzegovina

== People ==
- Maksim Dubovik (born 1973), Russian football player
- Oljga N. Dubovik (born 1935), botanist
