= Glavica =

Glavica may refer to:

== Places ==
=== Bosnia and Herzegovina ===
- Glavica, Bosanska Krupa, a village
- Glavica, Glamoč, a village
- Glavica, Velika Kladuša, a village
- Drenova Glavica, a village near Bosanska Krupa
- Gola Glavica, a village near Trebinje
- Kunja Glavica, a village near Trebinje

=== Croatia ===
- Glavica, Požega-Slavonia County, a village near Pakrac
- Glavica, Karlovac County, a village near Bosiljevo
- Glavica, Zadar County, a village near Sukošan
- Kadina Glavica, a village near Drniš

=== Kosovo ===
- Glavica, Lipljan, a village near Lipljan
- Glavica, Štimlje, a village near Štimlje

=== Serbia ===
- Glavica (Paraćin), a village
- Glavica, Sremska Kamenica, a neighborhood
- Glavica, Paraćin, a village near Paraćin

== People ==
- Dejan Glavica (born 1991), Croatian footballer
- Vladimir Klaić (1925–1970), nicknamed Glavica, Croatian footballer
