= Srednji Bušević, Krupa na Uni =

Srednji Bušević Средњи Бушевић
- Village
- Location within Bosnia and Herzegovina
- Coordinates: 44.955475°N 16.210764°E
- Country: Bosnia and Herzegovina
- Entity: Republika Srpska
- Municipality: Krupa na Uni

Area
  - Total: 6.58 sq mi (17.03 km^{2})

Population (2013)
  - Total: 267
- Time zone: UTC+1 (CET)
  - Summer (DST): UTC+2 (CEST)

Srednji Bušević (Serbian Cyrillic: Средњи Бушевић) is a village in the municipality of Krupa na Uni, part of the Republika Srpska entity of Bosnia and Herzegovina.

Before the Bosnian War, the entire town of Srednji Bušević was part of the Bosanska Krupa municipality, but after the Dayton Peace Agreement one part of the inhabited area became a part of municipality Krupa na Uni, divided by the Inter-Entity Boundary Line.

== Demographics ==
According to the 2013 census, its population was 267, all Serbs.
