= Radić =

Radić (Serbo-Croatian Cyrillic: Радић) is a common South Slavic surname.

It is the most common surname in the Split-Dalmatia County in Croatia, and among the most frequent ones in another two counties.

Notable people with the name include:

- Antonio Radić (born 1987), Croatian chess player, host of the agadmator YouTube channel
- Dejan Radić (footballer) (born 1980), Serbian footballer
- Gabrijel Radić (born 1982), Serbian volleyball player
- Indira Radić (born 1966), Serbian pop-folk singer
- Jure Radić (priest) (1920–1990), Croatian scientist and priest
- Jure Radić (engineer) (1953–2016), Croatian civil engineer and politician
- Lepa Radić (1925–1943), Serbian World War II resistance fighter
- Mario Radić (tennis player) (born 1982), Croatian tennis player
- Mario Radić (politician) (born 1970), Croatian businessman and politician
- Marko Radić (born 1985), Serbian footballer
- Perica Radić (born 1984), Serbian footballer
- Radivoj Radić (born 1954), Serbian historian
- Smiljan Radić Clarke (born 1965), Chilean architect
- Stojan Radic, American engineer
- Stjepan Radić (1871–1928), Croatian politician and founder of the Croatian Peasant Party
- Tomislav Radić (1940–2015), Croatian film director and screenwriter
- Zdravko Radić (born 1979), Montenegrin water polo player

== See also ==
- Radič, South Slavic given name in the Middle Ages
- Gigi Radics (born 1996), Hungarian pop singer
- Radović
- Mali Radić, a village in Bosnia
- Veliki Radić, a village in Bosnia
