= Otoka, Krupa na Uni =

Otoka Отока
- Village
- Location within Bosnia and Herzegovina
- Country: Bosnia and Herzegovina
- Entity: Republika Srpska
- Municipality: Krupa na Uni

Area
  - Total: 0.52 sq mi (1.35 km^{2})

Population (2013)
  - Total: 0
- Time zone: UTC+1 (CET)
  - Summer (DST): UTC+2 (CEST)

Otoka (Serbian Cyrillic: Отока) is a settlement that was once part of Bosanska Otoka that is now part of the Krupa na Uni municipality.

Before the Bosnian War, the entire town was part of the Bosanska Krupa municipality, but after the Dayton Peace Agreement one part of the inhabited area of Otoka became a part of municipality Krupa na Uni, divided by the Inter-Entity Boundary Line.

== Demographics ==
According to the 2013 census, its population was 0.
