= Bosanska Otoka =

Bosanska Otoka Босанска Отока
- Village
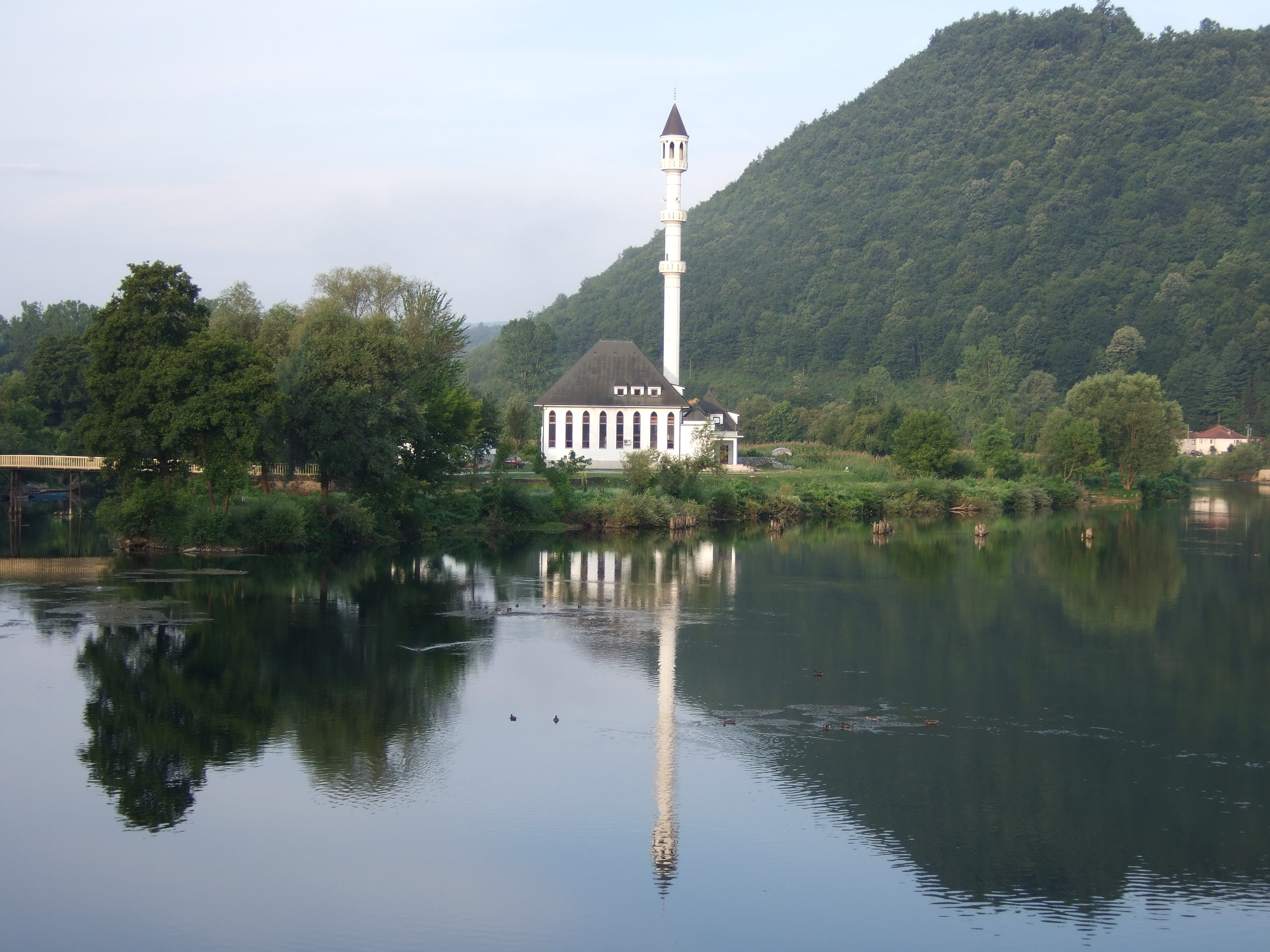
- Bosanska Otoka with mosque at river Una

- Location within Bosnia and Herzegovina
- Coordinates: 44°57′33″N 16°10′49″E
- Country: Bosnia and Herzegovina
- Entity: Federation of Bosnia and Herzegovina
- Canton: Una-Sana
- Municipality: Bosanska Krupa

Area
  - Total: 8.22 sq mi (21.29 km^{2})

Population (2013)
  - Total: 3,221
  - Density: 391.8/sq mi (151.3/km^{2})
- Time zone: UTC+1 (CET)
  - Summer (DST): UTC+2 (CEST)

Bosanska Otoka (Serbian Cyrillic: Босанска Отока) or just Otoka (Отока) is a village on the river Una in Bosnia and Herzegovina. It is part of the Bosanska Krupa municipality of Una-Sana Canton, in the Federation of Bosnia and Herzegovina.

It was once known as Otok, the local word for island. Before the Bosnian War, the entire town was part of the Bosanska Krupa municipality, but after the Dayton Peace Agreement one part of the inhabited area of Otoka became a part of municipality Krupa na Uni, divided by the Inter-Entity Boundary Line. It lies on the ancient Roman road connecting the Podunavlje region to the Adriatic Sea

Otoka is located 11 km north of Bosanska Krupa, 23 km from Bužim and 22 km southwest of Novi Grad (formerly Bosanski Novi). Otoka spans both banks of the River Una and includes 24 river islets. The right and left banks are connected by a steel bridge built in 1920.

== Demographics ==
According to the 2013 census, its population was 3,221.

Ethnicity in 2013
Ethnicity	Number	Percentage
Bosniaks	3,164	98.2%
Croats	10	0.3%
Serbs	1	0.0%
other/undeclared	46	1.4%
Total	3,221	100%
