= Petrovići =

Petrovići may refer to:

- Petrovići, Istočno Novo Sarajevo, a village in Bosnia and Herzegovina
- Petrovići, Trebinje, a village in Bosnia and Herzegovina
- Petrovići, Croatia, a village near Vrbovsko, Croatia
- Petrovići, Nikšić, a village in Montenegro
- Donji Petrovići, a village in Bosnia and Herzegovina
- Gornji Petrovići, a village in Bosnia and Herzegovina
- Petrovići, Olovo, a village in Bosnia and Herzegovina
- Petrović-Njegoš dynasty or Petrovići, the Serbian family that ruled Montenegro from 1697 to 1916

== See also ==
- Petrovici, surname (including a list of people with the name)
- Petrović, surname (including a list of people with the name)
