= Operation Munja '93 =

1993 Bosnian War operation

- Part of the Bosnian War
| Date | January 11, 1993 |
| Location | Banjani region, Bosanska Krupa, and Novi Grad |
| Result | ARBiH victory |

Belligerents
| Republic of Bosnia and Herzegovina | (Republika Srpska (1992–1995)) Republika Srpska |

Commanders and leaders
| (Republic of Bosnia and Herzegovina) Izet Nanić | (Republika Srpska (1992–1995)) Ranko Dabić |

Units involved
| ARBiH: 505th Buzim Brigade | VRS: 1st Novigrad Light Brigade |

Strength
| 360 soldiers | Unknown |

Casualties and losses
| 18 dead | 163 dead Several hundred wounded |

Operation Munja '93 (lit. 'lightning') was a military operation conducted on January 11, 1993, by the 505th Bužim Brigade of the Army of the Republic of Bosnia and Herzegovina (ARBiH). The operation aimed to regain control of the territory in the Banjani area from the Army of Republika Srpska (VRS).

== Background ==
Planned in secrecy during October 1992, the operation involved 360 armed fighters from the 505th Bužim Brigade divided into six groups. An additional 360 unarmed personnel followed behind the combat groups, tasked with evacuating casualties and collecting weapons from the dead or wounded. Opposing them was VRS's battalion of the 1st Novigrad Light Brigade, equipped with heavier weaponry than the ARBiH forces.

== Operation ==
The main attack targeted Banjani and Dobro Selo. The operation commenced on January 11th with assaults on VRS bunkers, marked by the use of the phrase "Allahu Ekber". Within two hours, the ARBiH inflicted a significant defeat on the VRS 1st Krajina Corps. By ten o'clock, most planned positions were secured, except for the Banjani school, which was captured two days later. VRS counterattacks using elite troops failed to retake any lost ground.

== Aftermath ==
The 505th Bužim Brigade recaptured approximately 40 km^{2} of territory during the operation. ARBiH losses amounted to 18 soldiers, 8 of whom died on the first day. VRS casualties included 163 confirmed deaths, and several hundred wounded. Operation Munja significantly bolstered the 505th Bužim Brigade's reputation, demonstrating their ability to prevail despite facing a force with superior weaponry.
