= Perna =

Perna may refer to:

- Perna (surname)
- Perna, Bosanska Krupa, a village in Bosnia and Herzegovina
- Perna, Croatia, a village near Vrginmost, Croatia
- Perna, Poland, a village in Kutno County, Poland
- Perná a municipality and village in the Czech Republic
- Pernå, a municipality in Finland
- Perna caste, a Hindu caste in India
- Perna-de-pau, a population of native Portuguese-speakers, recognized as Indians in 1993
- Perna Krick (1909–1991), American sculptor, painter and teacher
- Perna (bivalve), a genus of saltwater mussel
- Perna perna, an economically important mussel, a bivalve mollusc belonging to the family Mytilidae
- Perna canaliculus, the New Zealand green-lipped mussel
- Perna viridis, the Asian green mussel
