= Petrovici =

Petrovici is a surname. Notable people with the surname include:

- Anton Petrovici (1790s–1854), Wallachian composer, musicologist, and poet
- Cristina Petrovici (born 1950), Romanian handball player
- Emil Petrovici (1899–1968), Romanian linguist
- Ion Petrovici (1882–1972), Romanian philosopher
- Ion N. Petrovici (1929–2021), Romanian-born German neurologist
- Veronika Petrovici (1934–2023), German-Romanian plastic surgeon

== See also ==
- Petrovići (disambiguation)
- Petrovichi (disambiguation)
