= Mario Vrećo =

Serbian YouTuber, influencer, model and actor (born 1997)

- Марио Врећо
- Born: Marijo Vrećo; 2 November 1997 (age 29); Belgrade, Serbia, FR Yugoslavia

YouTube information
- Channel: Mario Vrećo
- Years active: 2018–present
- Genre: Commentary
- Subscribers: 612,000
- Views: 213,291,457
- Website: https://mariovreco.com/

Marijo Vrećo (Belgrade, 2 November 1997), better known by his stage name Mario Vrećo, is a Serbian YouTuber, influencer, model and actor.

== Biography ==
Vrećo runs a YouTube channel, where he does comedy in a sarcastic and parodic style. His content often exposes boorishness, ignorance and poor values in society, using secondhand embarrassment and parody as its main elements. The videos he publishes are focused on analyzing and critiquing negative phenomena in society, including public figures. His commentary videos have occasionally prompted broader public and law enforcement attention, such as his 2026 coverage of a TikTok creator operating under the name "Faraon", which was cited by media following police action.

In 2021, together with the Instagram page Negujmosrbski, Vrećo organized a social media campaign to gather positive reviews for the series Kursadžije on IMDb, where the series held a rating of 9.9/10 based on 16,000 reviews during October of that year.

=== Acting ===
He has played several amateur roles in film. He himself has said that he cannot act as other characters, but he can present himself through various states. Because of this, he has devoted himself more to his persona on his YouTube channel. He has appeared in several film projects, including the short film Dog Days of Summer (2019) as Jovan. In 2022, he played a Glovo delivery driver in the short student film Vanzemunac. In addition, he has appeared in music videos for the song "Nirvana" by the singer Zoi, as well as the song "Jedan kratak dijalog" by the Belgrade band Gazorpazorp.

=== Modeling ===
His work has been featured in media outlets such as The Pink Prince. He has worked for major brands including Coca-Cola, Converse, Doritos, A1, Nordeus, Ananas and Old Spice.
