= 505th Bužim Brigade =

Former Bosnian Army military unit

505th Knightly Motorised Brigade
- 505. Viteška Motorizovana brigada
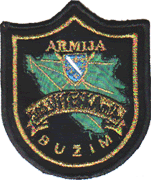
- Patch of the 505th Bužim Brigade
- Active: 15 August 1992 - 1995
- Country: Bosnia and Herzegovina
- Branch: Army of the Republic of Bosnia and Herzegovina
- Type: Infantry
- Garrison/HQ: Bužim
- Engagements: Bosnian War; Siege of Bihać (1992-95); Operation Oganj '92; Operation Munja '93; Battle of Velika Kladuša (1993); Johovica ambush; Operation "Breza '94"; Operation Tiger (1994); Operation Shield ‘94; Operation Spider; Mala Kladuša offensive; Operation Vrnograč 95; Operation Sword–1; Operation Sana

Commanders
- Notable commanders: Izet Nanić

The 505th Knightly Motorised Brigade (505. Bužimska brigada) was part of the 5th Corps of the Bosnian Army under the command of Brigadier General Izet Nanić. The 505th Knightly Motorized brigade was honored by the late president of Bosnia and Herzegovina, Alija Izetbegović, as the most elite brigade during the Bosnian War.

The 505th Knightly Motorized brigade was commanded by Izet Nanić from its creation to his death in 1995. Throughout the Bosnian war the 505th brigade liberated about 300 km^{2} of Bosnian territory from the Republika Srpska entity.

== History ==
The brigade was formed on 15 August 1992 and was initially known as the "105 Bužim Krajina Infantry Brigade." However, it was renamed on 1 April to the 505th Brigade. On the day of the formation, the brigade had 97 officers, 140 non-commissioned officers, and 1,452 soldiers, with one-third of them being armed with infantry or hunting weapons. On 14 December, by decision of the presidency, the brigade was given the title "Knightly". The first war experience of the brigade was on 21 April 1992, where soldiers from the Army of Republika Srpska attacked Bosanska Krupa to seize it. They did not complete their objective. Still, the lack of weapons and ammunition forced the units to cross to the left bank of the Una River where positions were consolidated and established, and RS forces' advance in the direction of Cazin and Bužim was stopped. The first major victory of the brigade was in Munja '93, where 360 poorly armed fighters from the brigade fought against a well fortified and well armed brigade from the Army of Republika Srpska and won. 163 Serb soldiers were killed in the battle and several hundred were wounded, while only 18 from the 505th Brigade were killed.

The commander of the brigade, Izet Nanić, was killed in the Siege of Bihać during Operation Storm on 5 August 1995. He was posthumously awarded the Order of the Golden Lily, and the Order of Hero of the Liberation War.

=== Operation Oganj '92 ===
Operation Oganj '92
- Part of the Bosnian War
Date	October 7, 1992
Location	Bosanska Krajina, Republic of Bosnia and Herzegovina
Result	ARBiH victory

Belligerents
Republic of Bosnia and Herzegovina	Republika Srpska

Commanders and leaders
Izet Nanić	Ranko Dabić

Units involved
Army of the Republic of Bosnia and Herzegovina; 5th Corps; 105th Bužim-Krajina Infantry Brigade	Army of Republika Srpska; 1st Krajina Corps; 1st Novigrad Infantry Brigade

Strength
Unknown	Unknown

Casualties and losses
43 wounded	Several killed

Operation "Oganj '92" was a military action carried out on October 7, 1992, by the 505th Bužim Brigade, then known as the 105th Bužim-Krajina Brigade. The goal of the operation was to push back the 1st Novigrad Infantry Brigade of the Army of Republika Srpska (VRS), which was positioned on the outskirts of Bužim, and to capture the elevation point Ćorkovača.

In this operation, the 505th Bužim Brigade captured Ćorkovača, taking control over part of the border of the Republic of Bosnia and Herzegovina (RBiH). The action was carried out by CSN HAMZA and the company from the second battalion of the 105th Bužim Brigade along with the APAČE unit from the 111th Bosanska Krupa Brigade. This battle was a strategic success for the young general Izet Nanić and marked the first offensive action of the 505th Bužim Brigade.

Approximately 20 km^{2} of territory in the area of Ćorkovača was captured, a significant amount of weapons and ammunition was seized, and several dozen VRS soldiers were killed. This conquest created significantly more favorable conditions for planning a broader action to capture territory of the RBiH toward the north and east. A frontal assault was no longer the only option. The border of RBiH from Ćulumak to Ćorkovača, a length of 10 km, was secured and not lost again for the remainder of the war.

== Losses ==
The 505th Buzim Brigade had 462 killed, 2,514 wounded and 189 missing / captured fighters.

== Reorganized Units ==
The brigade was reorganized, and these units were added:

- 1. Detachment TO Bužim
- 2. Detachment TO Bužim
- 3. Detachment TO Bužim
- Special Forces Unit "Hamze"
- Special Forces Unit "Gazije"
- Independent Units from the Detachment TO Bužim

== Sources ==
- Felić, Bejdo (2002). Peti Korpus 1992-1995. Ljiljan. ISBN 9789958220982.
- Thomas, Nigel; Mikulan, K. (2013). The Yugoslav Wars (2): Bosnia, Kosovo and Macedonia 1992–2001. Bloomsbury Publishing. ISBN 9781472802446.
