= Koprivna, Oštra Luka =

Koprivna Копривна (Serbian)
- Village (Selo)
- Location within Bosnia and Herzegovina
- Coordinates: 44°49′04″N 16°39′11″E
- Country: Bosnia and Herzegovina
- Entity: Republika Srpska
- Municipality: Oštra Luka

Population (2013)
  - Total: 553
- Time zone: UTC+1 (CET)
  - Summer (DST): UTC+2 (CEST)

Koprivna (Serbian Cyrillic: Копривна) is a village in the municipality of Oštra Luka, Republika Srpska, Bosnia and Herzegovina. The village lies just north of the Inter-Entity Boundary Line and is surrounded by it to the south, west and southeast.
