= Srednji Petrovići =

Petrovići
- Village
- Location within Bosnia and Herzegovina
- Coordinates: 44.884360°N 16.291715°E
- Country: Bosnia and Herzegovina
- Entity: Republika Srpska
- Municipality: Krupa na Uni

Area
  - Total: 0.26 sq mi (0.67 km^{2})

Population (2013)
  - Total: 2
- Time zone: UTC+1 (CET)
  - Summer (DST): UTC+2 (CEST)

Srednji Petrovići is a village in the municipality of Krupa na Uni, part of the Republika Srpska entity of Bosnia and Herzegovina.

== Demographics ==
According to the 2013 census, its population was 2, both Bosniaks.
