= Mali Dubovik =

Mali Dubovik Мали Дубовик
- Village
- Location within Bosnia and Herzegovina
- Coordinates: 44°52′44.04″N 16°20′44.16″E
- Country: Bosnia and Herzegovina
- Entity: Republika Srpska
- Municipality: Krupa na Uni

Area
  - Total: 5.21 sq mi (13.50 km^{2})

Population (2013)
  - Total: 175
- Time zone: UTC+1 (CET)
  - Summer (DST): UTC+2 (CEST)

Mali Dubovik (Serbian Cyrillic: Мали Дубовик) is a village in Krupa na Uni, Republika Srpska, Bosnia and Herzegovina.

== History ==
Prior to the Bosnian War, the village was part of the municipality of Bosanska Krupa, which today is part of the Una-Sana Canton Federation of Bosnia and Herzegovina.

== Demographics ==
In the census of 1991, it had 300 inhabitants, a majority of residents being ethnic Serbs. According to the 2013 census, its population was 175, all Serbs.

=== Demographic history ===
Nationality	Number	%
Serbs	298	99.33
Others	2	0.66
