= Vranjska =

Vranjska (pronounced [ʋrâɲska]) is a Serbo-Croatian toponym, derived from vran, an archaic word for "dark, black". It may refer to:

- Vranjska, Bosanska Krupa, village in northwestern Bosnia and Herzegovina
- Vranjska (Bileća), village in southeastern Bosnia and Herzegovina
- Vranjska Banja, spa town in southern Serbia
- Gornja Vranjska, town in western Serbia
- Mala Vranjska, village in western Serbia
- FK Železničar Vranjska Banja, football team

== See also ==
- Vranje
- Vranjak (disambiguation)
