= Zenkovići =

- Village
- Location within Bosnia and Herzegovina
- Coordinates: 44.8037°N 16.6027°E
- Country: Bosnia and Herzegovina
- Entity: Federation of Bosnia and Herzegovina; Republika Srpska
- Canton Region: Una-Sana; Prijedor
- Municipality: Sanski Most; Oštra Luka

Area
  - Total: 2.78 sq mi (7.20 km^{2})

Population (2013)
  - Total: 100
  - Density: 36/sq mi (14/km^{2})
- Time zone: UTC+1 (CET)
  - Summer (DST): UTC+2 (CEST)

Zenkovići is a village in the municipalities of Oštra Luka, Republika Srpska and Sanski Most, Federation of Bosnia and Herzegovina, Bosnia and Herzegovina.

== Demographics ==
According to the 2013 census, its population was 100, all living in the Sanski Most part, thus none in the Republika Srpska part.

Ethnicity in 2013
Ethnicity	Number	Percentage
Bosniaks	78	78.0%
Serbs	21	21.0%
other/undeclared	1	1.0%
Total	100	100%
