= Gornja Suvaja =

Gornja Suvaja may refer to:

- Gornja Suvaja (Bosanska Krupa) in Bosnia and Herzegovina
- Gornja Suvaja, Croatia, a village near Gračac
