= Donja Suvaja =

Donja Suvaja may refer to:

- Donja Suvaja, Bosnia and Herzegovina, a village near Bosanska Krupa
- Donja Suvaja, Croatia, a village near Gračac
