= William Perna =

American documentary filmmaker

- Born: United States
- Other names: Bill Perna
- Occupation: Documentary filmmaker

William Perna, also known as Bill Perna, is an American documentary filmmaker who currently lives in South Freeport, Maine and Italy. He was president of the Association of Independent Commercial Producers (West and National branches) during the early 1990s.

Perna is known for producing documentary films and music videos, including Alan Parsons' "Don't Answer Me" (1984), Billy Joel's "We Didn't Start the Fire" (1989), and Janet Jackson's "Escapade" (1990). In 2018, Perna filmed and edited Two Pillars episodes featuring Vietnamese painters Trần Văn Cẩn and Nguyễn Tư Nghiêm for the Indochina Arts Partnership.

== Education and career ==
Perna studied pre-law at the University of New Mexico. Later, he transferred to New York University's (NYU) film school. After his studies at NYU, he worked in advertising in the late 1980s. Perna worked with people such as William Bernbach of Doyle Dane Bernbach (also known as DDB Worldwide), David Ogilvy of Ogilvy & Mather, and Mary Wells Lawrence at Wells, Rich, Greene.

In 1991, Perna moved to California. He and film director Peter Smillie formed Smillie Films, a commercial production company. Smillie Films made commercials and produced music videos for musicians such Janet Jackson, Billy Joel, and Sting.

He was also president of AICP/West and was elected to AICP/National, which represented the interests of commercial production companies. He has also served on the Boards of Camden International Film Festival and Sea Meadow Marine Foundation.

Perna returned to the New York to create an ad agency called the Artustry Partnership. During this time, Perna collaborated with David Sklaver, former president of Wells, Rich, Greene and film director Bob Giraldi. He later left the agency to form a new agency called DCODE.

Bill and his wife, Deanie, lived in Connecticut, and had a house in South Freeport, Maine. After 2001, they moved to Maine. Initially, Perna founded Sparhawk Brewers in Maine. Perna was then contacted by Maysles Films and began to work with documentary filmmakers Albert Maysles.

In the mid-2000s, Perna began to direct independent documentary films. His film, Welcome to Lee Maine (2007), aired on PBS. Perna's second film, Running with Luci (2010), co-written with his son Michael Perna, raised awareness and funds for a rare childhood illness. Perna and Hanoi-based Creative Director Suzanne Lecht of Art Vietnam collaborated to film contemporary Asian artists throughout Vietnam, Laos, and Cambodia. Perna also created The Art of Nom, a film about five Vietnamese artists known as the Zenai Group. The Zenai Group was reviving a Vietnamese script called Chu Nom.

== Podcast ==
Perna also hosts a podcast called Maine Aquaculture.

== Filmography ==
=== Music videos ===
Year	Artist	Title	Credits	Ref.
1984	Alan Parsons	"Don't Answer Me"		
1989	Billy Joel	"We Didn't Start the Fire"	Producer	
1990	Janet Jackson	"Escapade"	Producer	

=== Documentaries ===
Year	Title	Director	Producer	Notes	Ref.
2011	Welcome to Lee Maine	check		PBS	
2013	Running with Luci	check			
2016	Art of Nom	check	check		
2017	Gray Matters	check	check	Filmed for Rhode Island PBS	
2018	Two Pillars - Trần Văn Cẩn	check		Filmed and edited for Indochina Arts Partnership	
2018	Two Pillars - Nguyễn Tư Nghiêm	check		Filmed and edited for Indochina Arts Partnership	

== See also ==
- Association of Independent Commercial Producers
