= Kursadžije =

Serbian television series

Kursadžije (known from 2008 onward as Maturanti) is a Serbian comedy series broadcast by TV Pink from 2006 to 2008, with a short revival in 2013. The sitcom is situated in a police academy, where the students come from each republic of the former Yugoslavia. Initially with six students for the six independent republics at the time, the cast grew to include an Albanian from Kosovo and a Gypsy.

For Season 3, all of the students participated in their version of Jugovizija, where they sing for their respective republic, a parody of the Eurovision Song Contest.

== Students (Season 1) ==
Andrija Kovač - Hrvoje Metličić (Croat)
Ranko Goranović - Milojko "Gedža" Ružić (Serb)
Nebojša Čolić - Fikret "Fiko" Karakurtović (Bosnian)
Branko Vidaković - Janez Drško (Slovenian)
Saša Pantić - Dimče Seksovski (Macedonian)
Branko Babović - Đuro Palica (Montenegrin)

== Students (Season 2) ==
Andrija Kovač - Hrvoje Metličić (Croat)
Ranko Goranović - Milojko "Gedža" Ružić (Serb)
Nebojša Čolić - Fikret "Fiko" Karakurtović (Bosnian)
Branko Vidaković - Janez Drško (Slovenian)
Ubavka Ščepanović - Ubavka Seksovski (Macedonian)
Branko Babović - Đuro Palica (Montenegrin)
Saša Pantić - Ajdemi Popuši (Kosovo Albanian)
Ljiljana Jakšić - Salveta Jovanović (Gypsy)

== Students (Season 3) ==
Bata Zdravković	Folk Singer
Seka Aleksić	Electrodance Singer
Slavica Ćukteraš	Pop Singer
Peja	Showman
Boro Drljača	Folk Singer
Milan Dinčić Dinča	Folk Singer
Olja Karleuša	Pop Singer

== Teachers ==
- Director Oskar
- Professor Labud (played by Radovan Miljanić)
- Professor Galeb (played by Uglješa Vujović)
- Professor Maca (played by Dragana Vujić)
- Professor Cuca (played by Jovana Petronijević)
