= Boro Drljača =

Serbian folk singer (1941–2020)

Boro Drljača Боро Дрљача
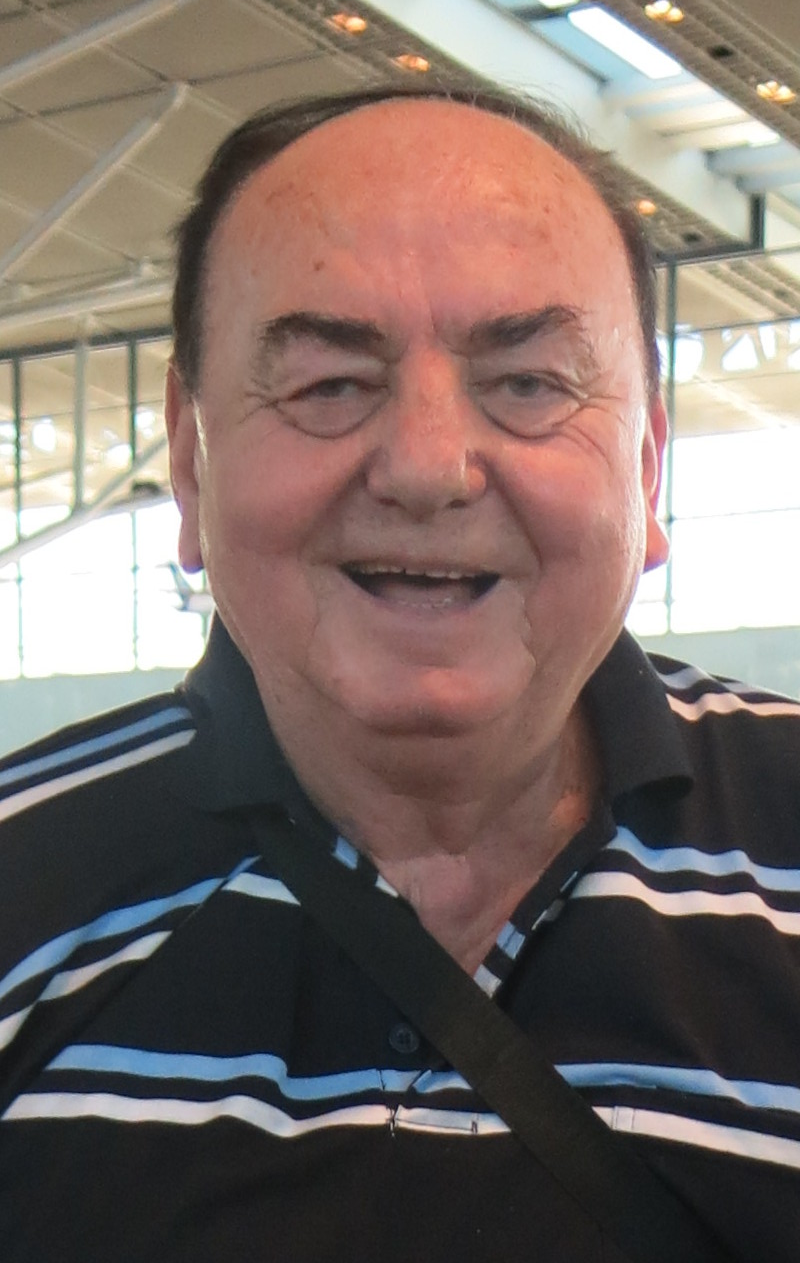
- Drljača in May 2014

Background information
- Also known as: Boro
- Born: Borislav Drljača; 29 August 1941; Donja Suvaja, Independent State of Croatia
- Died: 11 October 2020 (aged 79) Belgrade, Serbia
- Genre: Folk
- Occupation: Singer
- Years active: 1967–2020
- Labels: PGP-RTS; Jugoton; Diskos; RTV Ljubljana; Grand; Jugodisk

Borislav "Boro" Drljača (Serbian Cyrillic: Борислав "Боро" Дрљача; 29 August 1941 – 11 October 2020) was a Serbian folk singer from Bosanska Krajina. Recognized as one of the most eminent Yugoslav folk singers, he received the Life Achievement Award for his work. Drljača recorded over four hundred songs including "Stari vuk" (Old Wolf), "Ne namiguj na me tuđa ženo" (Don't Wink at Me, Someone Else's Wife), and "Plači, mala, plači" (Cry, Baby, Cry). He also performed for Serbian diaspora across Europe, The United States, Canada and Australia.

In addition to his music career, Drljača also appeared on reality shows Veliki Brat VIP 4 (2010) and Parovi 4 (2015). Furthermore, he was a subject of numerous popular internet memes on social media.

== Early life ==
Borislav Drljača was born on 29 August 1941 in the village of Donja Suvaja, former Kingdom of Yugoslavia into a Serb family during World War II. Drljača's father Branko was an economist, store manager and a guitarist while his mother Stoja was also an economist. When he was two years old, his mother died after being killed by the Ustashas and his father later remarried after the war, leaving him with no photographs of his mother. Drljača finished primary school in Donja Suvaja, after which he went to his uncle in Bačka Topola. He also finished agricultural high school there, Drljača eventually relocated to Belgrade to study agronomy at the University of Belgrade.

== Personal life ==
Drljača was married twice. From his first marriage, with his late wife Verica Drljača, he has two sons: Vladimir, who has master's degree management in Paris, and Branislav, who graduated in painting in Belgrade. Drljača had a hard time withstanding his first wife's death because she committed suicide in 2006. Drljača met his second wife, Radomirka Sladić, at his concert. The couple did not have children and Sladić died from cancer in 2018.

Drljača was liberal and in 2019 surprised many when he offered support for LGBTQ+ population and stated that he is in favour of gay marriage but also adoption.

On 11 October 2020 Drljača died from colon cancer in his New Belgrade apartment.

== Discography ==
Singles and EPs

- 1967 - Ne znam mlađan gdje ću pre
- 1969 – Za ljubav tvoju (For Your Love)
- 1970 - Ti si sve što želim (You Are All I Want)
- 1973 – Sarajevo divno mjesto (Sarajevo Lovely Place)
- 1974 - Krajišnici gdje ćemo ne prelo
- 1975 - Kad zapjeva grupa Krajišnika (When a Group of Krajišniks Sings)
- 1975 - Nas dvoje smo srećni (We Are Both Happy)
- 1977 - Tjeraj mala stado iza brijega
- 1980 - Prijo moja, kako ćemo
- 1981 - Pismo ratnom drugu (A Letter to a Wartime Friend)

Albums

- 1975 – Ti si sve što želim (You Are All I Want)
- 1976 – Krajišnici gdje ćemo na prelo (Krajišniks Where Do We Go for Some Fun)
- 1978 – Pjevaj mi, pjevaj sokole (Sing to Me, Falcon)
- 1980 – Bora i Gordana Runjajić (Bora and Gordana Runjajić)
- 1981 – Bora Drljača (Bora Drljača)
- 1982 – Jugosloven (The Yugoslav)
- 1984 – Nas dvoje veže ljubav (A Love Binds Two of Us)
- 1985 – Čovjek sam iz naroda (I Am a Man of the People)
- 1986 – Pjevaj srce (Sing, My Heart)
- 1988 – Alal vera majstore (Congratulations, Maestro)
- 1990 – Ko te uze zlato moje (Who Took You, My Precious)
- 1991 – Krajino, Krajino (Oh Krajina, Oh Krajina)
- 1991 – Ja sam čovek za tebe (I Am the Man for You)
- 1993 – Ne dam Krajine (I Will Not Give Up Krajina)
- 1995 – Nema raja bez rodnoga kraja (There is No Paradise Without Homeland)
- 1996 – Krajišnik sam ja (I'm a Krajišnik)
- 1998 – Sine sine (Son, My Son)
- 1999 – Rača II (Rača II)
- 2002 – Car ostaje car (A Tsar Remains a Tsar)
- 2004 – Bora Drljača uživo (Bora Drljača Live)
- 2004 – Stari vuk (Old Wolf)
- 2007 – Brbljivica (Gossip Girl)

== See also ==
- Music of Serbia
- Serbian folk music
- Culture of Serbia

== Notes ==
1. He is often referred to as Bora.
