= Zalin =

Zalin Залин
- Village
- Location within Bosnia and Herzegovina
- Country: Bosnia and Herzegovina
- Entity: Federation of Bosnia and Herzegovina
- Canton: Una-Sana
- Municipality: Bosanska Krupa

Area
  - Total: 3.58 sq mi (9.26 km^{2})

Population (2013)
  - Total: 125
  - Density: 35.0/sq mi (13.5/km^{2})
- Time zone: UTC+1 (CET)
  - Summer (DST): UTC+2 (CEST)

Zalin (Serbian Cyrillic: Залин) is a village in the municipality of Bosanska Krupa, Bosnia and Herzegovina.

== Demographics ==
According to the 2013 census, its population was 125, all Bosniaks.
