= Usorci, Oštra Luka =

Usorci Усорци (Serbian)
- Village (Selo)
- Location within Bosnia and Herzegovina
- Coordinates: 44°50′21″N 16°41′09″E
- Country: Bosnia and Herzegovina
- Entity: Republika Srpska
- Municipality: Oštra Luka

Population (2013)
  - Total: 449
- Time zone: UTC+1 (CET)
  - Summer (DST): UTC+2 (CEST)

Usorci (Serbian Cyrillic: Усорци) is a village in the municipality of Oštra Luka, Republika Srpska, Bosnia and Herzegovina.
