= Mali Badić =

Mali Badić Мали Бадић
- Village
- Location within Bosnia and Herzegovina
- Coordinates: 44°53′34″N 16°13′20″E
- Country: Bosnia and Herzegovina
- Entity: Federation of Bosnia and Herzegovina
- Canton: Una-Sana
- Municipality: Bosanska Krupa

Area
  - Total: 1.22 sq mi (3.15 km^{2})

Population (2013)
  - Total: 177
  - Density: 146/sq mi (56.2/km^{2})
- Time zone: UTC+1 (CET)
  - Summer (DST): UTC+2 (CEST)

Mali Badić (Serbian Cyrillic: Мали Бадић) is a village in the municipality of Bosanska Krupa, Bosnia and Herzegovina.

== Demographics ==
According to the 2013 census, its population was 177.

Ethnicity in 2013
Ethnicity	Number	Percentage
Bosniaks	162	91.5%
other/undeclared	15	8.5%
Total	177	100%
