= Voloder, Bosnia and Herzegovina =

Village in Bosanska Krupa, Bosnia and Herzegovina

Voloder Володер
- Village
- Location within Bosnia and Herzegovina
- Coordinates: 44°58′N 16°10′E
- Country: Bosnia and Herzegovina
- Entity: Federation of Bosnia and Herzegovina
- Canton: Una-Sana
- Municipality: Bosanska Krupa

Area
  - Total: 2.43 sq mi (6.30 km^{2})

Population (2013)
  - Total: 1,114
  - Density: 458/sq mi (177/km^{2})
- Time zone: UTC+1 (CET)
  - Summer (DST): UTC+2 (CEST)

Voloder (Serbian Cyrillic: Володер) is a village in the municipality of Bosanska Krupa, Bosnia and Herzegovina.

== Demographics ==
According to the 2013 census, its population was 1,114.

Ethnicity in 2013
Ethnicity	Number	Percentage
Bosniaks	1,088	97.7%
Serbs	1	0.1%
other/undeclared	25	2.2%
Total	1,114	100%
