= Gorinja =

Gorinja Гориња
- Village
- Location within Bosnia and Herzegovina
- Coordinates: 44°47′N 16°14′E
- Country: Bosnia and Herzegovina
- Entity: Federation of Bosnia and Herzegovina
- Canton: Una-Sana
- Municipality: Bosanska Krupa

Area
  - Total: 6.95 sq mi (18.01 km^{2})

Population (2013)
  - Total: 36
  - Density: 5.2/sq mi (2.0/km^{2})
- Time zone: UTC+1 (CET)
  - Summer (DST): UTC+2 (CEST)

Gorinja (Serbian Cyrillic: Гориња) is a village in the municipality of Bosanska Krupa, Bosnia and Herzegovina.

== Demographics ==
According to the 2013 census, its population was 36, all Serbs.
