= Radovich =

Radovich is a surname. Notable people with the surname include:

- Bill Radovich (1915–2002), American football player
- Dragan Radovich (born 1956), American soccer player
- Drew Radovich (born 1985), American football player
- Frank Radovich (born 1938), American basketball player and coach
- Moe Radovich (1929–2004), American basketball player and coach

== See also ==
- Radović
