= Vranjak =

Vranjak (pronounced [ʋrâɲak], Serbian Cyrillic: Врањак) is a Serbo toponym, derived from vran, an archaic word for "dark, black". It may refer to:

- Vranjak, Modriča, Bosnia and Herzegovina
- Vranjak, Orahovac, Kosovo

== See also ==
- Vranje
- Vranjska (disambiguation)
