= Velika Jasenica =

Velika Jasenica Велика Јасеница
- Village
- Location within Bosnia and Herzegovina
- Coordinates: 44°49′06″N 16°15′06″E
- Country: Bosnia and Herzegovina
- Entity: Federation of Bosnia and Herzegovina
- Canton: Una-Sana
- Municipality: Bosanska Krupa

Area
  - Total: 2.52 sq mi (6.53 km^{2})

Population (2013)
  - Total: 11
  - Density: 4.4/sq mi (1.7/km^{2})
- Time zone: UTC+1 (CET)
  - Summer (DST): UTC+2 (CEST)

Velika Jasenica (Serbian Cyrillic: Велика Јасеница) is a village in the municipality of Bosanska Krupa, Bosnia and Herzegovina.

== Demographics ==
According to the 2013 census, its population was 11, all Serbs.
