= Donji Dubovik =

Donji Dubovik may refer to:

- Donji Dubovik, Krupa na Uni, a village in Bosnia and Herzegovina
- Donji Dubovik (Višegrad), a village in Bosnia and Herzegovina
