= Pištaline =

Pištaline Пишталине
- Village
- Location within Bosnia and Herzegovina
- Coordinates: 44°56′44″N 16°04′44″E
- Country: Bosnia and Herzegovina
- Entity: Federation of Bosnia and Herzegovina
- Canton: Una-Sana
- Municipality: Bosanska Krupa

Area
  - Total: 8.19 sq mi (21.20 km^{2})

Population (2013)
  - Total: 1,316
  - Density: 160.8/sq mi (62.08/km^{2})
- Time zone: UTC+1 (CET)
  - Summer (DST): UTC+2 (CEST)

Pištaline (Serbian Cyrillic: Пишталине) is a village in the municipality of Bosanska Krupa, Bosnia and Herzegovina.

== Demographics ==
According to the 2013 census, its population was 1,316.

Ethnicity in 2013
Ethnicity	Number	Percentage
Bosniaks	1,299	98.7%
Croats	2	0.2%
Serbs	1	0.1%
other/undeclared	14	1.1%
Total	1,316	100%
