= Petrovichi (disambiguation) =

Petrovichi may refer to the following places in Russia:

- Petrovichi, village in Shumyachsky District of Smolensk Oblast, Russia
- Petrovichi, Khabarovsk Krai, Russia
- Petrovichi, Primorsky Krai, Russia
- Petrovichi, Ryazan Oblast, Russia

== See also ==
- Petrovici, Romanian surname
