= Radović =

Radović (Serbian: Радовић) is a common surname in Serbia, Montenegro, Bosnia and Herzegovina and Croatia. It is sometimes spelled Radovic in English and is related to the German version Radowitz, Romanian Radovici and Hungarian Radovics.

== People whose last name is Radović ==
- Aleksandar Radović (disambiguation), multiple people
- Aleksandra Radović (born 1974), Serbian singer
- Andrija Radović (1872–1947), Montenegrin politician
- Cristián Contreras Radovic (born 1969), Chilean journalist and politician
- Darinka Radović (1896–1943), activist for the Yugoslav Partisans and People's Hero of Yugoslavia
- Dragan Radović (born 1976), Montenegrin football player
- Duško Radović (1922–1984), Serbian journalist and writer
- Igor Radović (born 1978), Montenegrin football player
- Ilija Radović (born 1985), Montenegrin football player
- Lazar Radović (born 1937), Montenegrin football player
- Milan Radović (born 1952), Serbian football player
- Miodrag Radović (born 1957), Yugoslav football player
- Miroslav Radović (born 1984), Serbian football player
- Nikola Radović (1933–1991), Yugoslav football player
- Novica Radović (1890–1945), Montenegrin politician
- Vasilije Radović (born 1938), Yugoslav football player
- Velibor Radović (born 1972), Montenegrin-Israeli basketball player
- Vesna Radović (born 1954), Yugoslav-Austrian handball player
- Zeljko Radovic (Austrian footballer) (born 1974)
- Zoran Radović (born 1961), Serbian basketball player

== See also ==
- Radovich
