= Potkalinje =

Potkalinje Поткалиње
- Village
- Location within Bosnia and Herzegovina
- Coordinates: 44°49′38″N 16°19′04″E
- Country: Bosnia and Herzegovina
- Entity: Federation of Bosnia and Herzegovina
- Canton: Una-Sana
- Municipality: Bosanska Krupa

Area
  - Total: 4.67 sq mi (12.09 km^{2})

Population (2013)
  - Total: 45
  - Density: 9.6/sq mi (3.7/km^{2})
- Time zone: UTC+1 (CET)
  - Summer (DST): UTC+2 (CEST)

Potkalinje (Serbian Cyrillic: Поткалиње) is a village in the municipality of Bosanska Krupa, Bosnia and Herzegovina.

== Demographics ==
According to the 2013 census, its population was 45, all Serbs.
