= Perna (surname) =

Perna is a surname. Notable people with the surname include:

- Armando Perna (born 1981), Italian football central defender
- Gustave F. Perna (born 1960), United States Army general
- Martín Perna (born 1975), American educator and artist
- Pietro Perna (1519–1582), Italian printer
- Rosalba Perna, Italian-American astrophysicist
- William Perna, American filmmaker
