= Jasenica (Bosanska Krupa) =

Jasenica Јасеница
- Village
- Location within Bosnia and Herzegovina
- Coordinates: 44°48′10″N 16°15′32″E
- Country: Bosnia and Herzegovina
- Entity: Federation of Bosnia and Herzegovina
- Canton: Una-Sana
- Municipality: Bosanska Krupa

Government
  - Gradonačelnik: Samir Alijagić

Area
  - Total: 7.10 sq mi (18.39 km^{2})

Population (2013)
  - Total: 137
  - Density: 19.3/sq mi (7.45/km^{2})
- Time zone: UTC+1 (CET)
  - Summer (DST): UTC+2 (CEST)

Jasenica (Serbian Cyrillic: Јасеница) is a village in the municipality of Bosanska Krupa, Bosnia and Herzegovina.

== Demographics ==
According to the 2013 census, its population was 137.

Ethnicity in 2013
Ethnicity	Number	Percentage
Bosniaks	72	52.6%
Serbs	61	44.5%
other/undeclared	4	2.9%
Total	137	100%
