= Ostrožnica =

Ostrožnica Острожница
- Village
- Location within Bosnia and Herzegovina
- Coordinates: 44°53′10″N 16°11′01″E
- Country: Bosnia and Herzegovina
- Entity: Federation of Bosnia and Herzegovina
- Canton: Una-Sana
- Municipality: Bosanska Krupa

Area
  - Total: 3.22 sq mi (8.35 km^{2})

Population (2026)
  - Total: 765
  - Density: 237/sq mi (91.6/km^{2})
- Time zone: UTC+1 (CET)
  - Summer (DST): UTC+2 (CEST)

Ostrožnica (Serbian Cyrillic: Острожница) is a village in the municipality of Bosanska Krupa, Bosnia and Herzegovina.

== Demographics ==
According to the 2013 census, its population was 794.

Ethnicity in 2013
Ethnicity	Number	Percentage
Bosniaks	792	99.7%
Croats	1	0.1%
other/undeclared	1	0.1%
Total	794	100%
