= Veliki Badić =

Veliki Badić Велики Бадић
- Village
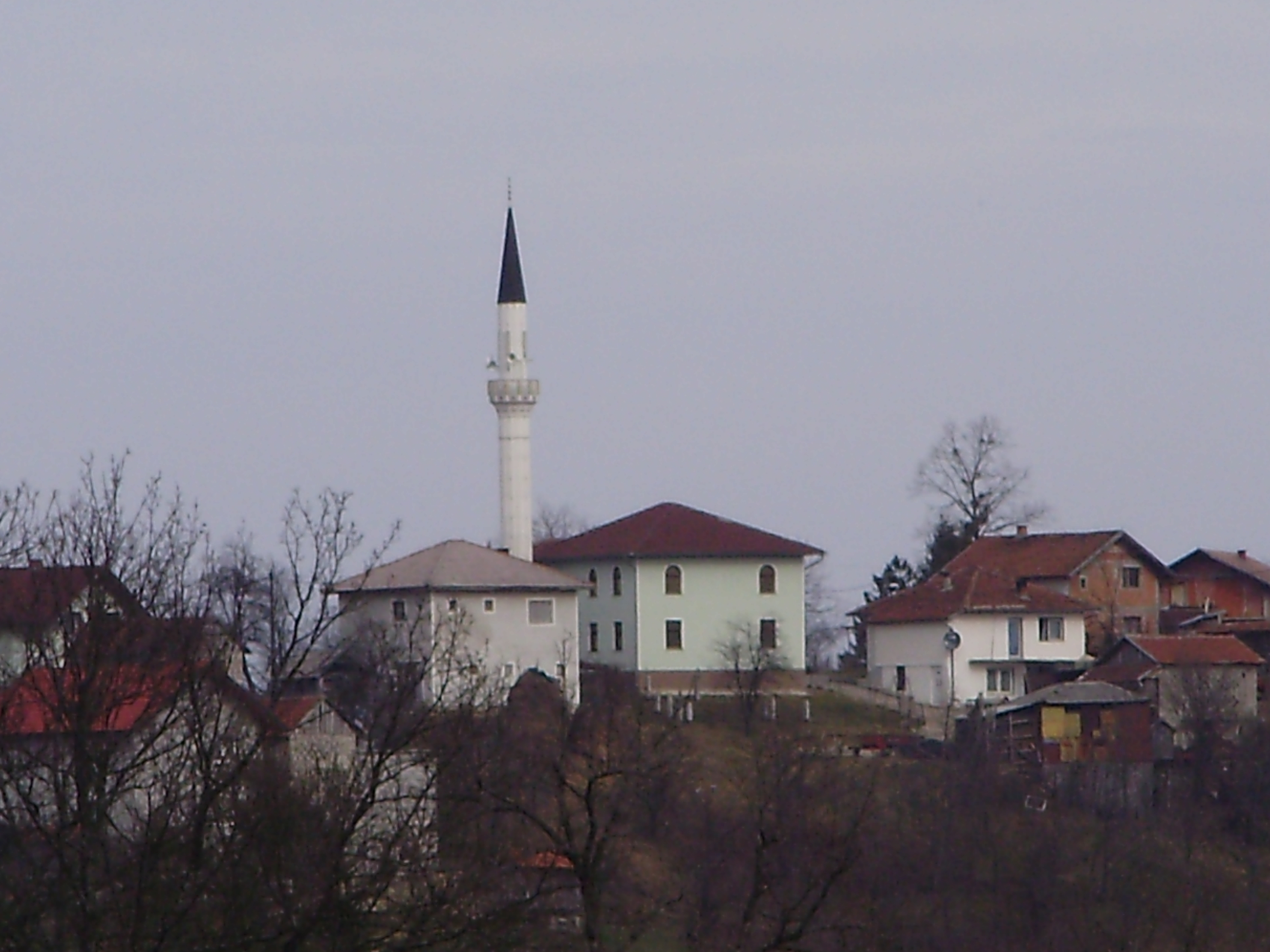
- Veliki Badić

- Location within Bosnia and Herzegovina
- Coordinates: 44°55′16″N 16°10′56″E
- Country: Bosnia and Herzegovina
- Entity: Federation of Bosnia and Herzegovina
- Canton: Una-Sana
- Municipality: Bosanska Krupa

Area
  - Total: 4.53 sq mi (11.73 km^{2})

Population (2013)
  - Total: 794
  - Density: 175/sq mi (67.7/km^{2})
- Time zone: UTC+1 (CET)
  - Summer (DST): UTC+2 (CEST)

Veliki Badić (Serbian Cyrillic: Велики Бадић) is a village in the municipality of Bosanska Krupa, Bosnia and Herzegovina.

== Demographics ==
According to the 2013 census, its population was 794.

Ethnicity in 2013
Ethnicity	Number	Percentage
Bosniaks	789	99.4%
other/undeclared	5	0.6%
Total	794	100%
