= Gornji Bušević =

Gornji Bušević Горњи Бушевић
- Village
- Location within Bosnia and Herzegovina
- Coordinates: 44.899490°N 16.252627°E
- Country: Bosnia and Herzegovina
- Entity: Federation of Bosnia and Herzegovina
- Canton: Una-Sana
- Municipality: Bosanska Krupa

Area
  - Total: 1.69 sq mi (4.39 km^{2})

Population (2013)
  - Total: 30
  - Density: 18/sq mi (6.8/km^{2})
- Time zone: UTC+1 (CET)
  - Summer (DST): UTC+2 (CEST)

Gornji Bušević (Serbian Cyrillic: Горњи Бушевић) is a village in the municipality of Bosanska Krupa, Bosnia and Herzegovina.

== Demographics ==
According to the 2013 census, its population was 30, all Serbs.
