= Hašani, Bosanska Krupa =

Village in Bosnia and Herzegovina

Hašani Хашани
- Village
- Location within Bosnia and Herzegovina
- Coordinates: 44.824151°N 16.354466°E
- Country: Bosnia and Herzegovina
- Entity: Federation of Bosnia and Herzegovina
- Canton: Una-Sana
- Municipality: Bosanska Krupa

Area
  - Total: 2.32 sq mi (6.02 km^{2})

Population (2013)
  - Total: 8
  - Density: 3.4/sq mi (1.3/km^{2})
- Time zone: UTC+1 (CET)
  - Summer (DST): UTC+2 (CEST)

Hašani (Serbian Cyrillic: Хашани) is a village in the municipality of Bosanska Krupa, Bosnia and Herzegovina.

== Demographics ==
According to the 2013 census, its population was 8, all Bosniaks.
