= Baštra =

Baštra Баштра
- Village
- Location within Bosnia and Herzegovina
- Coordinates: 44°59′49″N 16°10′16″E
- Country: Bosnia and Herzegovina
- Entity: Federation of Bosnia and Herzegovina
- Canton: Una-Sana
- Municipality: Bosanska Krupa

Area
  - Total: 3.76 sq mi (9.73 km^{2})

Population (2013)
  - Total: 204
  - Density: 54.3/sq mi (21.0/km^{2})
- Time zone: UTC+1 (CET)
  - Summer (DST): UTC+2 (CEST)

Baštra (Serbian Cyrillic: Баштра) is a village in the municipality of Bosanska Krupa, Bosnia and Herzegovina.

== Demographics ==
According to the 2013 census, its population was 204.

Ethnicity in 2013
Ethnicity	Number	Percentage
Bosniaks	198	97.1%
Serbs	4	2.0%
other/undeclared	2	1.0%
Total	204	100%
