= Jezerski, Bosanska Krupa =

Village in Bosnia and Herzegovina

Jezerski
- Village
- Location within Bosnia and Herzegovina
- Coordinates: 44°53′N 16°15′E
- Country: Bosnia and Herzegovina
- Entity: Federation of Bosnia and Herzegovina
- Canton: Una-Sana
- Municipality: Bosanska Krupa

Area
  - Total: 11.99 sq mi (31.06 km^{2})

Population (2013)
  - Total: 2,756
  - Density: 229.8/sq mi (88.73/km^{2})
- Time zone: UTC+1 (CET)
  - Summer (DST): UTC+2 (CEST)

Jezerski is a village in the municipality of Bosanska Krupa, Bosnia and Herzegovina.

== Demographics ==
According to the 2013 census, its population was 2,756.

Ethnicity in 2013
Ethnicity	Number	Percentage
Bosniaks	2,736	99.3%
Serbs	4	0.1%
other/undeclared	16	0.6%
Total	2,756	100%
