= Mahmić Selo =

Mahmić Selo Махмић Село
- Village
- Location within Bosnia and Herzegovina
- Coordinates: 44°59′27″N 16°02′53″E
- Country: Bosnia and Herzegovina
- Entity: Federation of Bosnia and Herzegovina
- Canton: Una-Sana
- Municipality: Bosanska Krupa

Area
  - Total: 5.52 sq mi (14.29 km^{2})

Population (2013)
  - Total: 1,369
  - Density: 248.1/sq mi (95.80/km^{2})
- Time zone: UTC+1 (CET)
  - Summer (DST): UTC+2 (CEST)

Mahmić Selo (Serbian Cyrillic: Махмић Село) is a village in the municipality of Bosanska Krupa, Bosnia and Herzegovina.

== Demographics ==
According to the 2013 census, its population was 1,369.

Ethnicity in 2013
Ethnicity	Number	Percentage
Bosniaks	1,360	99.3%
other/undeclared	9	0.7%
Total	1,369	100%

== Notable people ==
- Ermin Mahmić - football player
