= Srednji Bušević =

Srednji Bušević Средњи Бушевић
- Village
- Location within Bosnia and Herzegovina
- Coordinates: 44°56′59″N 16°12′47″E
- Country: Bosnia and Herzegovina
- Entity: Federation of Bosnia and Herzegovina
- Canton: Una-Sana
- Municipality: Bosanska Krupa

Area
  - Total: 0.57 sq mi (1.47 km^{2})

Population (2013)
  - Total: 0
  - Density: 0.0/sq mi (0.0/km^{2})
- Time zone: UTC+1 (CET)
  - Summer (DST): UTC+2 (CEST)

Srednji Bušević (Serbian Cyrillic: Средњи Бушевић) is a village in the municipality of Bosanska Krupa, Bosnia and Herzegovina.

== Demographics ==
According to the 2013 census, its population was 0, down from 13 in 1991.
