= Vojevac =

Vojevac Војевац
- Village
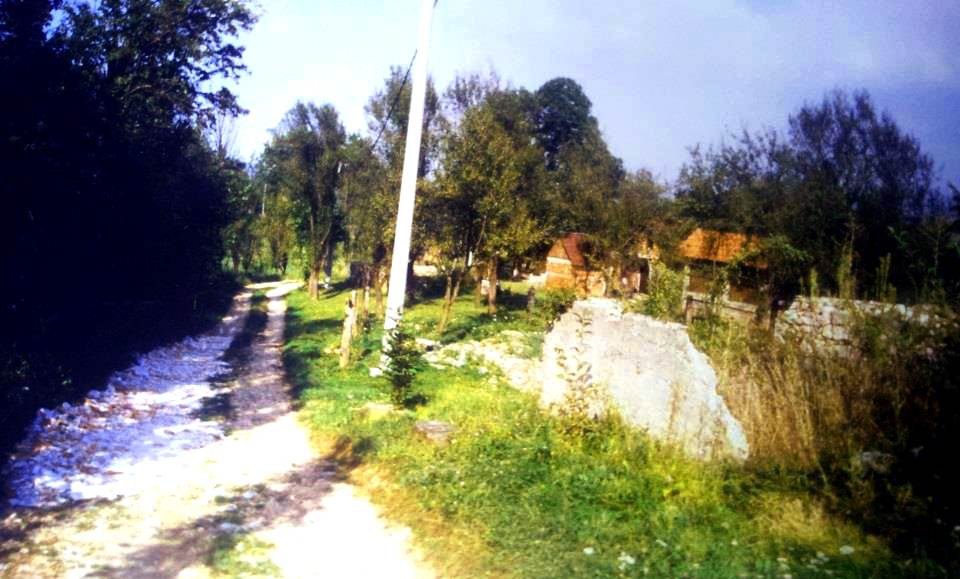
- Vojevac (Village)

- Location within Bosnia and Herzegovina
- Coordinates: 44°48′13″N 16°13′18″E
- Country: Bosnia and Herzegovina
- Entity: Federation of Bosnia and Herzegovina
- Canton: Una-Sana
- Municipality: Bosanska Krupa

Area
  - Total: 12.01 sq mi (31.11 km^{2})

Population (2013)
  - Total: 36
  - Density: 3.0/sq mi (1.2/km^{2})
- Time zone: UTC+1 (CET)
  - Summer (DST): UTC+2 (CEST)

Vojevac (Serbian Cyrillic: Војевац) is a village in the municipality of Bosanska Krupa, Bosnia and Herzegovina.

== Demographics ==
According to the 2013 census, its population was 36.

Ethnicity in 2013
Ethnicity	Number	Percentage
Serbs	29	80.6%
Bosniaks	7	19.4%
Total	36	100%
