= Pučenik =

Pučenik Пученик
- Village
- Location within Bosnia and Herzegovina
- Coordinates: 44°51′47″N 16°10′52″E
- Country: Bosnia and Herzegovina
- Entity: Federation of Bosnia and Herzegovina
- Canton: Una-Sana
- Municipality: Bosanska Krupa

Area
  - Total: 5.00 sq mi (12.95 km^{2})

Population (2013)
  - Total: 8
  - Density: 1.6/sq mi (0.62/km^{2})
- Time zone: UTC+1 (CET)
  - Summer (DST): UTC+2 (CEST)

Pučenik (Serbian Cyrillic: Пученик) is a village in the municipality of Bosanska Krupa, Bosnia and Herzegovina.

== Demographics ==
According to the 2013 census, its population was 8, all Serbs.
