= Kunja Glavica =

Kunja Glavica Куња Главица
- Village
- Location within Bosnia and Herzegovina
- Coordinates: 42°37′N 18°24′E
- Country: Bosnia and Herzegovina
- Entity: Republika Srpska
- Municipality: Trebinje
- Time zone: UTC+1 (CET)
  - Summer (DST): UTC+2 (CEST)

Kunja Glavica (Serbian Cyrillic: Куња Главица) is a village in the municipality of Trebinje, Republika Srpska, Bosnia and Herzegovina.
