= Oljga N. Dubovik =

Russian botanist

Oljga N. Dubovik (born 1935) is a botanist. Dubovik's works are collection and description of spermatophytes in Russia and Ukraine. In 1993 she issued no. 201 until 250 of the exsiccata Herbarium florae Ukraine.
