= Veliki Dubovik =

Veliki Dubovik Велики Дубовик
- Village
- Location within Bosnia and Herzegovina
- Coordinates: 44°51′N 16°17′E
- Country: Bosnia and Herzegovina
- Entity: Federation of Bosnia and Herzegovina
- Canton: Una-Sana
- Municipality: Bosanska Krupa

Area
  - Total: 3.49 sq mi (9.05 km^{2})

Population (2013)
  - Total: 104
  - Density: 29.8/sq mi (11.5/km^{2})
- Time zone: UTC+1 (CET)
  - Summer (DST): UTC+2 (CEST)

Veliki Dubovik (Serbian Cyrillic: Велики Дубовик) is a village in the municipality of Bosanska Krupa, Bosnia and Herzegovina.

== Demographics ==
According to the 2013 census, its population was 104.

Ethnicity in 2013
Ethnicity	Number	Percentage
Bosniaks	98	98.0%
Serbs	2	4.2%
other/undeclared	4	3.8%
Total	104	100%
