= Veronika Petrovici =

Veronika (also Veronica) Petrovici (21 July 1934 in Tătulești, Romania – 2 April 2023) was a Romanian-German plastic surgeon and associate professor of plastic and reconstructive surgery at the Medical Faculty of the University of Cologne. She introduced the method of surgical removal of arterio-venous malformations after superselective embolisation.

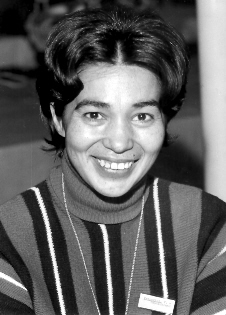
Veronika Petrovici

== Life ==
Veronika Petrovici graduated from the Slatina state high school in 1952. She completed her studies at the Carol Davila University of Medicine and Pharmacy in 1959 with the medical state examination and obtained her doctorate with the thesis On epilepsy in cerebro-vascular diseases.

From 1960, Veronika Petrovici received further training in plastic surgery at the Clinic for General Surgery and the Clinic for Plastic and Reconstructive Surgery at the University of Bucharest. She was recognised as a specialist in plastic surgery in 1965.

She moved to Germany in 1969, where she began working at the Clinic for Plastic Surgery at the University of Cologne, under the direction of Josef Schrudde. In addition to her duties as a clinician, Veronika Petrovici was also able to work scientifically and in 1982 she completed her habilitation at the University of Cologne with the thesis Contributions to the classification and therapy of skin angiomas. In 1988 she was awarded the title of "associate professor" at the University of Cologne by the Minister of Culture of the state of North Rhine-Westphalia.

Veronika Petrovici's scientific work is characterised by her studies on the classification, clinic and therapy of cutaneous haemangiomas and vascular malformations. Her findings have been published in numerous articles in specialist journals and contributions to monographs. The following of her contributions are worth mentioning:

- Unfallbedingte Spätschädigungen des Haut- und Subkutangewebes. In: Chirurgie der Gegenwart, 1975
- Slide Swing Skin Flap. In: Encyclopedia of Flaps, 1998
- Haemangiomas and vascular malformations. In: Krupp - Plastische Chirurgie, 2000
- Tratamento chirurgico degli emangiomi e delle malformazioni vascolari del viso. In: Mattasi - Malformazioni vascolari ed emangiomi, 2003.

The scientific work and clinical achievements of Veronika Petrovici have been recognised by three honorary memberships: International Society for the Study of Vascular Anomalies, Romanian Academy of Medical Science, Jordanian Society for Plastic and Reconstructive Surgery.

She was a member of the German Society of Surgery, the Association of German Plastic Surgeons, the International Society for Burn Injuries and the Società Italiana di Chirurgia Plastica.

Veronika Petrovici was widowed by the neurologist Ion N. Petrovici (1929–2021). She died in 2023 at the age of 88.

== Literature ==
- Der Chirurg, Vol. 51, 1980, (pp. 704–710)
- Plastic and Reconstructive Surgery, Vol. 67, No. 4, April 1981 (pp. 467–481)
- Plastic and Reconstructive Surgery, Vol. 68, No. 6, December 1981 (pp. 878–889)
- Handchirurgie, Vol. 18, 1986, (pp. 11–15)
