= Srednji Dubovik =

Srednji Dubovik Средњи Дубовик
- Village
- Location within Bosnia and Herzegovina
- Coordinates: 44°52′07″N 16°18′36″E
- Country: Bosnia and Herzegovina
- Entity: Federation of Bosnia and Herzegovina
- Canton: Una-Sana
- Municipality: Bosanska Krupa

Area
  - Total: 0.66 sq mi (1.72 km^{2})

Population (2013)
  - Total: 17
  - Density: 26/sq mi (9.9/km^{2})
- Time zone: UTC+1 (CET)
  - Summer (DST): UTC+2 (CEST)

Srednji Dubovik (Serbian Cyrillic: Средњи Дубовик) is a village in the municipality of Bosanska Krupa, Bosnia and Herzegovina.

== Demographics ==
According to the 2013 census, its population was 17, all Serbs.
