= Glavica, Bosanska Krupa =

Glavica Главица
- Village
- Location within Bosnia and Herzegovina
- Coordinates: 45°01′14″N 16°13′08″E
- Country: Bosnia and Herzegovina
- Entity: Federation of Bosnia and Herzegovina
- Canton: Una-Sana
- Municipality: Bosanska Krupa

Area
  - Total: 2.08 sq mi (5.40 km^{2})

Population (2013)
  - Total: 7
  - Density: 3.4/sq mi (1.3/km^{2})
- Time zone: UTC+1 (CET)
  - Summer (DST): UTC+2 (CEST)

Glavica (Serbian Cyrillic: Главица) is a village in the municipality of Bosanska Krupa, Bosnia and Herzegovina.

== Demographics ==
According to the 2013 census, its population was 7, all Serbs.
