= Vranjska (Bosanska Krupa) =

Vranjska Врањска
- Village
- Location within Bosnia and Herzegovina
- Country: Bosnia and Herzegovina
- Entity: Federation of Bosnia and Herzegovina
- Canton: Una-Sana
- Municipality: Bosanska Krupa

Area
  - Total: 6.54 sq mi (16.94 km^{2})

Population (2013)
  - Total: 124
  - Density: 19.0/sq mi (7.32/km^{2})
- Time zone: UTC+1 (CET)
  - Summer (DST): UTC+2 (CEST)

Vranjska (Serbian Cyrillic: Врањска, pronounced [ʋrâɲska]) is a village in the municipality of Bosanska Krupa, Bosnia and Herzegovina. The village is located in the north-western region of Bosnia and is a 30 kilometer drive from the city of Bihać, Bosnia and Herzegovina.

== Demographics ==
According to the 2013 census, its population was 124, all Serbs.
