= Perna, Bosanska Krupa =

Perna
- Village
- Location within Bosnia and Herzegovina
- Coordinates: 44.908581°N 16.098098°E
- Country: Bosnia and Herzegovina
- Entity: Federation of Bosnia and Herzegovina
- Canton: Una-Sana
- Municipality: Bosanska Krupa

Area
  - Total: 9.51 sq mi (24.64 km^{2})

Population (2013)
  - Total: 31
  - Density: 3.3/sq mi (1.3/km^{2})
- Time zone: UTC+1 (CET)
  - Summer (DST): UTC+2 (CEST)

Perna is a village in the municipality of Bosanska Krupa, Bosnia and Herzegovina.

== Demographics ==
According to the 2013 census, its population was 31.

Ethnicity in 2013
Ethnicity	Number	Percentage
Bosniaks	27	87.1%
Serbs	4	12.9%
Total	31	100%
