= Oštra Luka =

Village and municipality in Bosnia and Herzegovina

Oštra Luka Оштра Лука
- Village and municipality
- River Sana

- Location of Oštra Luka within Bosnia and Herzegovina

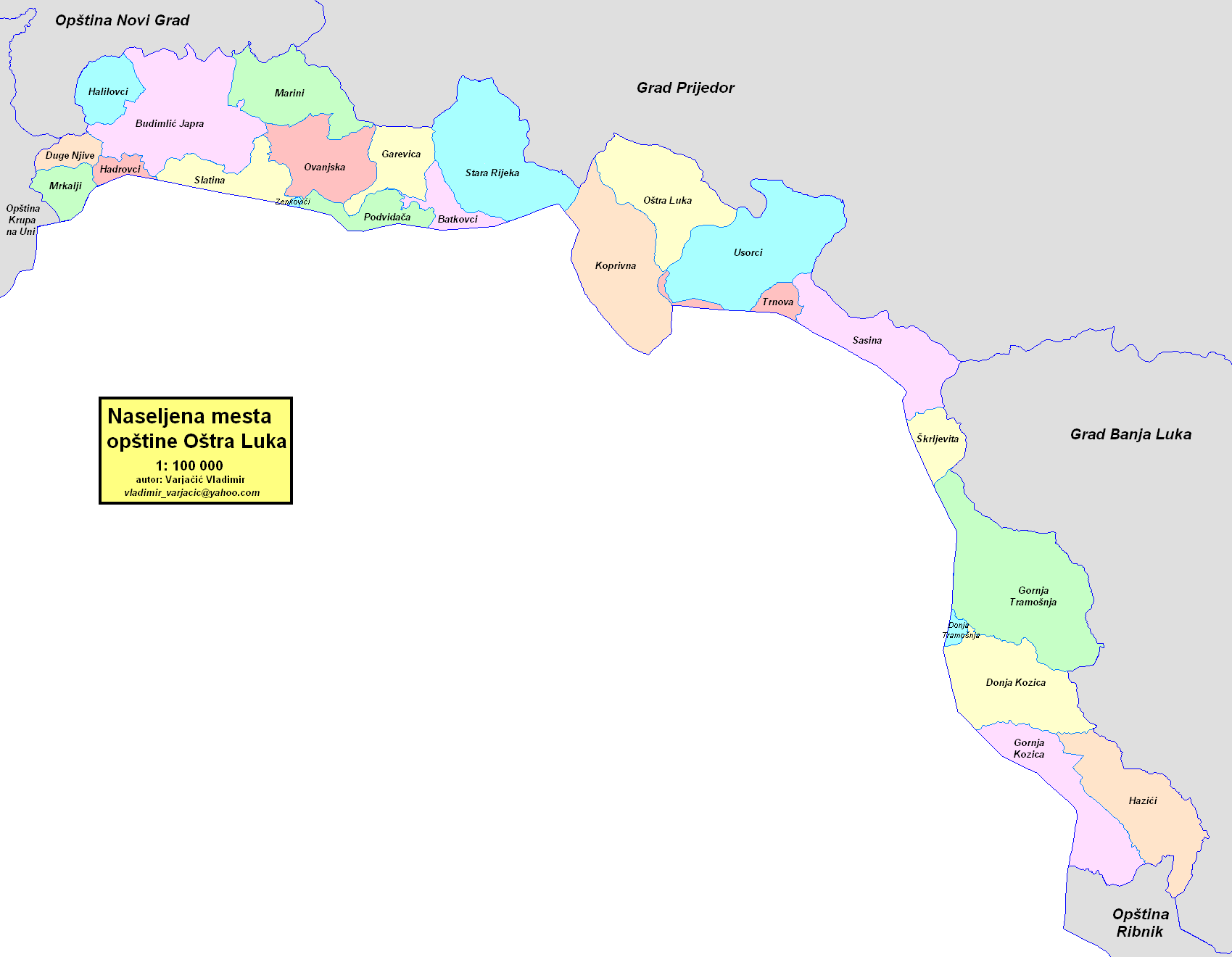
- Coordinates: 44°51′17″N 16°40′51″E
- Country: Bosnia and Herzegovina
- Entity: Republika Srpska
- Geographical region: Bosanska Krajina

Government
  - Municipal mayor: Duško Došenović (SNSD)

Area
  - Total: 204.91 km^{2} (79.12 sq mi)

Population (2013)
  - Total: 2,786
  - Density: 13.60/km^{2} (35.21/sq mi)
- Time zone: UTC+1 (CET)
  - Summer (DST): UTC+2 (CEST)
- Area code: 52
- Website: www.opstinaostraluka.org

Oštra Luka (Serbian Cyrillic: Оштра Лука) is a village and municipality in Republika Srpska, Bosnia and Herzegovina. As of 2013, the municipality has a population of 2,786 inhabitants, with 782 in Oštra Luka itself.

The municipality is situated in the northwestern part of the Republika Srpska and the central part of the Bosanska Krajina region. It was previously known as Srpski Sanski Most (Српски Сански Мост, "Serbian Sanski Most") and was formed after the Dayton Agreement from part of the pre-war municipality of Sanski Most (the other part of the pre-war municipality is now in the entity of Federation of Bosnia and Herzegovina).

== Geography ==
The municipality is located between the municipalities of Novi Grad and Prijedor in the north, Banja Luka in the east, Ribnik in the south, Sanski Most in the south and west, and Bosanska Krupa in the west. The territory of the municipality follows the Inter-Entity Boundary Line. Alongside Oštra Luka, other villages forming the municipality are Batkovci, Budimlić Japra, Donja Kozica, Donja Tramošnja, Duge Njive, Garevica, Gornja Kozica, Gornja Tramošnja, Hadrovci, Halilovci, Hazići, Koprivna, Marini, Mrkalji, Ovanjska, Podvidača, Sasina, Slatina, Stara Rijeka, Škrljevita, Trnova, Usorci, Zenkovići.

Contemporary administrative villages of Batkovci, Donja Kozica, Donja Tramošnja, Gornja Kozica, Gornja Tramošnja, Hadrovci, Koprivna, Mrkalji, Podvidača, Sasina, Slatina, Stara Rijeka, Škrljevita, Trnova, Zenkovići were created by the Inter-Entity Boundary Line between the Oštra Luka and Sanski Most municipality of the Una-Sana Canton. The boundary creates divided settlements which for administrative purposes function as independent villages while geographically and sociologically forming a single unit.

== Demographics ==
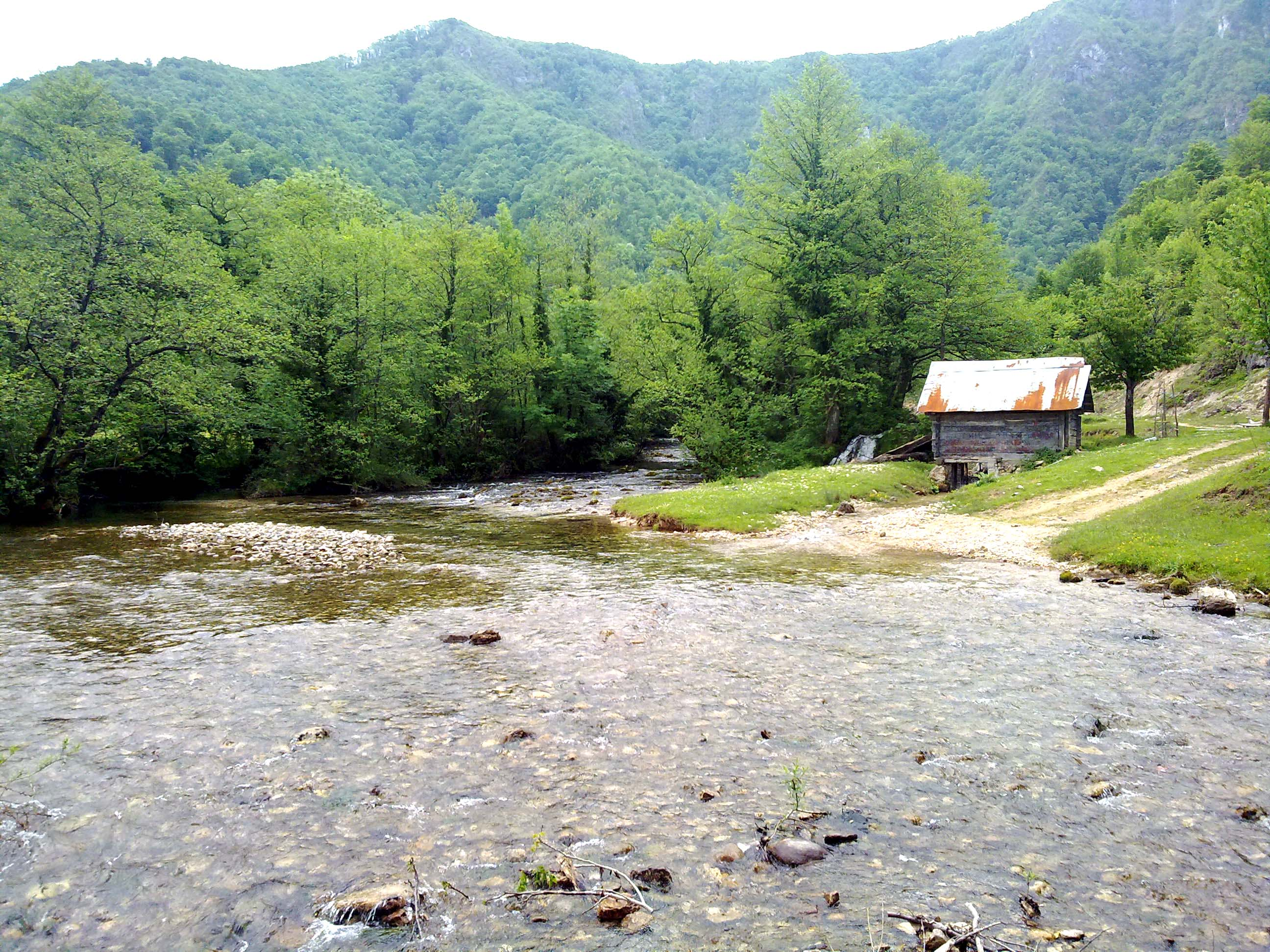
Nature in Oštra Luka

=== Population ===
Population of settlements – Oštra Luka municipality
	Settlement	1971.	1981.	1991.	2013.
	Total			2,786	2,786
1	Donja Kozica				225
2	Koprivna				524
3	Oštra Luka	759	867	838	817
4	Usorci				434

=== Ethnic composition ===
Ethnic composition – Oštra Luka
	2013.	1991.	1981.	1971.
Total	782 (100,0%)	838 (100,0%)	867 (100,0%)	759 (100,0%)
Serbs		778 (92,84%)	557 (64,24%)	743 (97,89%)
Croats		32 (3,819%)	28 (3,230%)	8 (1,054%)
Yugoslavs		17 (2,029%)	252 (29,07%)	3 (0,395%)
Bosniaks		7 (0,835%)	10 (1,153%)	4 (0,527%)
Others		4 (0,477%)	20 (2,307%)	1 (0,132%)

Ethnic composition – Oštra Luka municipality
	2013.	1991.
Total	2,786 (100,0%)	2,117 (100,0%)
Serbs	2,580 (92,61%)	1,407 (66,46%)
Croats	160 (5,743%)	401 (18,94%)
Bosniaks	23 (0,826%)	261 (12,33%)
Others	23 (0,826%)	16 (0,756%)
Yugoslavs		32 (1,512%)
