= Mali Radić =

Mali Radić Мали Радић
- Village
- Location within Bosnia and Herzegovina
- Coordinates: 44°50′14″N 16°05′45″E
- Country: Bosnia and Herzegovina
- Entity: Federation of Bosnia and Herzegovina
- Canton: Una-Sana
- Municipality: Bosanska Krupa

Area
  - Total: 8.15 sq mi (21.10 km^{2})

Population (2013)
  - Total: 111
  - Density: 13.6/sq mi (5.26/km^{2})
- Time zone: UTC+1 (CET)
  - Summer (DST): UTC+2 (CEST)

Mali Radić (Serbian Cyrillic: Мали Радић) is a village in the municipality of Bosanska Krupa, Bosnia and Herzegovina.

== Demographics ==
According to the 2013 census, its population was 111.

Ethnicity in 2013
Ethnicity	Number	Percentage
Serbs	108	97.3%
Bosniaks	3	2.7%
Total	111	100%
