= Glavica, Velika Kladuša =

Glavica
- Village
- Location within Bosnia and Herzegovina
- Coordinates: 45.136317°N 15.829415°E
- Country: Bosnia and Herzegovina
- Entity: Federation of Bosnia and Herzegovina
- Canton: Una-Sana
- Municipality: Velika Kladuša

Area
  - Total: 2.56 sq mi (6.64 km^{2})

Population (2013)
  - Total: 985
  - Density: 384/sq mi (148/km^{2})
- Time zone: UTC+1 (CET)
  - Summer (DST): UTC+2 (CEST)

Glavica is a village in the municipality of Velika Kladuša, Bosnia and Herzegovina.

== Demographics ==
According to the 2013 census, its population was 985.

Ethnicity in 2013
Ethnicity	Number	Percentage
Bosniaks	761	77.3%
Croats	4	0.4%
other/undeclared	220	22.3%
Total	985	100%
