= Nguyễn Tư Nghiêm =

Vietnamese lacquer painter

- Born: October 20, 1918; Nam Đàn, Nghệ An, Vietnam
- Died: June 15, 2016 (aged 97)
- Spouse: Nguyễn Thu Giang
- Parent: Nguyễn Tư Tái

Nguyễn Tư Nghiêm (1919 – 15 June 2016) was a Vietnamese lacquer painter. He was awarded the Ho Chi Minh Prize for fine art in 1996.
