= Gornji Petrovići =

Gornji Petrovići Горњи Петровићи
- Village
- Location within Bosnia and Herzegovina
- Coordinates: 44°51′49″N 16°14′13″E
- Country: Bosnia and Herzegovina
- Entity: Federation of Bosnia and Herzegovina
- Canton: Una-Sana
- Municipality: Bosanska Krupa

Area
  - Total: 4.87 sq mi (12.62 km^{2})

Population (2013)
  - Total: 47
  - Density: 9.6/sq mi (3.7/km^{2})
- Time zone: UTC+1 (CET)
  - Summer (DST): UTC+2 (CEST)

Gornji Petrovići (Serbian Cyrillic: Горњи Петровићи) is a village in the municipality of Bosanska Krupa, Bosnia and Herzegovina.

== Demographics ==
According to the 2013 census, its population was 47, all Serbs.
