= Banjani, Bosanska Krupa =

Village in Bosnia and Herzegovina

Banjani
- Village
- Location within Bosnia and Herzegovina
- Coordinates: 45.0198°N 16.1336°E
- Country: Bosnia and Herzegovina
- Entity: Federation of Bosnia and Herzegovina
- Canton: Una-Sana
- Municipality: Bosanska Krupa

Area
  - Total: 10.01 sq mi (25.92 km^{2})

Population (2013)
  - Total: 332
  - Density: 33.2/sq mi (12.8/km^{2})
- Time zone: UTC+1 (CET)
  - Summer (DST): UTC+2 (CEST)

Banjani is a village in the municipality of Bosanska Krupa, Bosnia and Herzegovina.

== Demographics ==
According to the 2013 census, its population was 332.

Ethnicity in 2013
Ethnicity	Number	Percentage
Bosniaks	292	88.0%
Serbs	39	11.7%
other/undeclared	1	0.3%
Total	332	100%
