= Aleksandar Radović =

Aleksandar Radović may refer to:

- Aleksandar Radović (footballer), Montenegrin football player
- Aleksandar Radović (water polo), Montenegrin water polo player
