= Gornja Suvaja (Bosanska Krupa) =

Gornja Suvaja Горњи Бушевић
- Village
- Location within Bosnia and Herzegovina
- Coordinates: 44°37′N 16°19′E
- Country: Bosnia and Herzegovina
- Entity: Federation of Bosnia and Herzegovina
- Canton: Una-Sana
- Municipality: Bosanska Krupa

Area
  - Total: 21.53 sq mi (55.75 km^{2})

Population (2013)
  - Total: 85
  - Density: 3.9/sq mi (1.5/km^{2})
- Time zone: UTC+1 (CET)
  - Summer (DST): UTC+2 (CEST)

Gornja Suvaja (Serbian Cyrillic: Горња Суваја) is a village in the municipality of Bosanska Krupa, Bosnia and Herzegovina.

== Demographics ==
According to the 2013 census, its population was 85.

Ethnicity in 2013
| Ethnicity | Number | Percentage |
|---|---|---|
| Serbs | 77 | 90.6% |
| Bosniaks | 3 | 3.5% |
| Croats | 1 | 1.2% |
| other/undeclared | 4 | 4.7% |
| Total | 85 | 100% |
