= Ion N. Petrovici =

German neurologist (1929–2021)

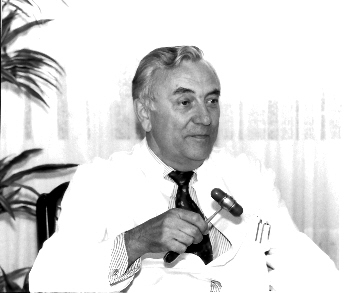
- Born: August 19, 1929; Ploiești, Romania
- Died: February 19, 2021 (aged 91)
- Citizenship: Romania; Germany
- Education: University of Bucharest
- Occupations: Neurologist; Physician; University teacher
- Spouse: Veronika Petrovici

Ion N. Petrovici (August 19, 1929 in Ploiești, Romania – February 19, 2021) was a German neurologist, professor of neurology and psychiatry at the University of Cologne.

Petrovici completed his secondary education in 1947 at his native city's Saints Peter and Paul High School. After studying at the Bucharest Faculty of Medicine, he received an MD degree from the University of Bucharest. He trained in neurology under Arthur Kreindler and Vlad Voiculescu at the Department of Clinical Neurology of the Institute for Neurological Research of the Romanian Academy of Sciences. In 1959, he became a specialist in neurology.

From 1964 to 1969, he held the position of chief of the service of pre-operative diagnosis at the Clinic of Neurosurgery of the University of Bucharest under Constantin Arseni. With Arseni and Frank Nass, Petrovici authored Vascular Diseases of the Brain and of the Spinal Cord in 1965.

In 1969, he emigrated to Germany and began his activity in Cologne at the Max Planck Institute for Brain Research under Klaus-Joachim Zülch. Despite his time-consuming clinical responsibilities during this period, he began to apply his research training to neurologic problems. He was habilitated into academic career (venia legendi) in 1978 and in 1983 became professor of neurology and psychiatry at the University of Cologne. In 1985 he was appointed director of the Department of Neurology at Merheim Hospital at the university. He held this position until his retirement in 1994.

Petrovici published numerous papers on cerebrovascular disease, seizure disorders, therapy of the malignant brain tumours, localisation theory of the higher brain functions, hemispheric specialisation and interhemispheric transfer of learning, the minor cerebral hemisphere and language. In 1962 he described the Alternating Asphygmo-Pyramidal Syndrome in occlusions of the carotid arteries.

Petrovici was a member of numerous scientific societies, such as the Deutsche Gesellschaft für Neurologie, Deutsche Gesellschaft für Klinische Neurophysiologie, Società Italiana di Neurologia, European Society of Neurology, New York Academy of Sciences; he was a Fellow of the Royal Society of Medicine, and, since 1994, an honorary member of the Romanian Academy of Sciences.

== Sources ==
- American-Romanian Academy of Arts and Sciences: Români în Știința și Cultura Occidentală, 1996 (Library of Congress Catalog Number 92-070310)
