= Drenova Glavica =

Drenova Glavica Дренова Главица
- Village
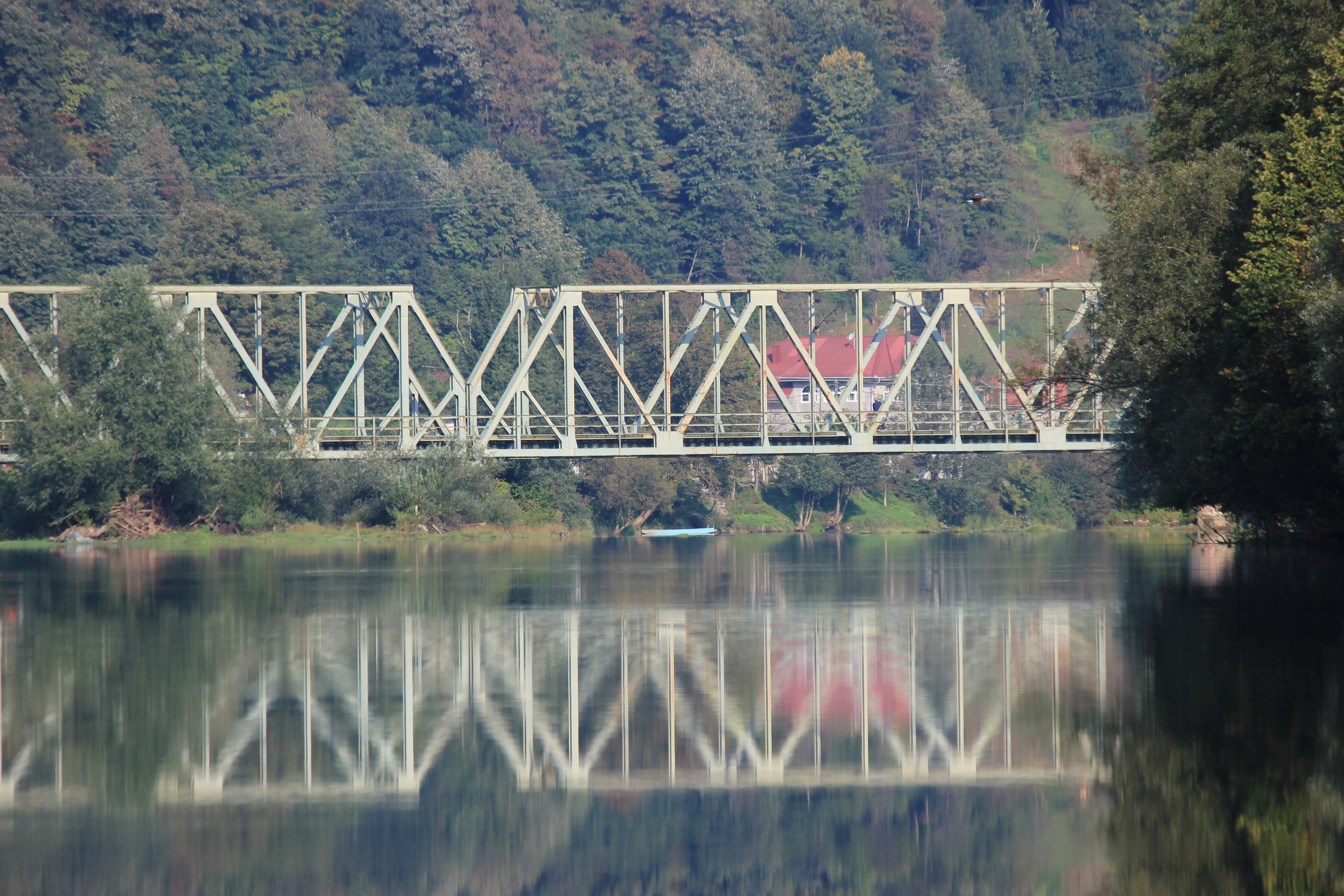
- Bridge of Una railway across River Una near Podvran, Bosnia

- Location within Bosnia and Herzegovina
- Coordinates: 44°55′N 16°09′E
- Country: Bosnia and Herzegovina
- Entity: Federation of Bosnia and Herzegovina
- Canton: Una-Sana
- Municipality: Bosanska Krupa

Area
  - Total: 2.26 sq mi (5.85 km^{2})

Population (2013)
  - Total: 253
  - Density: 112/sq mi (43.2/km^{2})
- Time zone: UTC+1 (CET)
  - Summer (DST): UTC+2 (CEST)

Drenova Glavica (Serbian Cyrillic: Дренова Главица) is a village in the municipality of Bosanska Krupa, Bosnia and Herzegovina.

== Demographics ==
According to the 2013 census, its population was 253.

Ethnicity in 2013
Ethnicity	Number	Percentage
Bosniaks	225	88.9%
Serbs	2	0.8%
other/undeclared	26	10.3%
Total	253	100%
