= Veliki Radić =

Veliki Radić Велики Радић
- Village
- Location within Bosnia and Herzegovina
- Coordinates: 44°50′13″N 16°03′08″E
- Country: Bosnia and Herzegovina
- Entity: Federation of Bosnia and Herzegovina
- Canton: Una-Sana
- Municipality: Bosanska Krupa

Area
  - Total: 17.93 sq mi (46.43 km^{2})

Population (2013)
  - Total: 133
  - Density: 7.42/sq mi (2.86/km^{2})
- Time zone: UTC+1 (CET)
  - Summer (DST): UTC+2 (CEST)

Veliki Radić (Serbian Cyrillic: Велики Радић) is a village in the municipality of Bosanska Krupa, Bosnia and Herzegovina.

== Demographics ==
According to the 2013 census, its population was 133, all Serbs.
