= Petrovići, Trebinje =

Petrovići Петровићи
- Village
- Location within Bosnia and Herzegovina
- Coordinates: 42°44′40″N 18°12′48″E
- Country: Bosnia and Herzegovina
- Entity: Republika Srpska
- Municipality: Trebinje
- Time zone: UTC+1 (CET)
  - Summer (DST): UTC+2 (CEST)

Petrovići (Serbian Cyrillic: Петровићи) is a village in the municipality of Trebinje, Republika Srpska, Bosnia and Herzegovina.
