= Donja Suvaja, Bosnia and Herzegovina =

Donja Suvaja Доња Суваја
- Village
- Location within Bosnia and Herzegovina
- Coordinates: 44°36′N 16°18′E
- Country: Bosnia and Herzegovina
- Entity: Federation of Bosnia and Herzegovina
- Canton: Una-Sana
- Municipality: Bosanska Krupa

Area
  - Total: 4.34 sq mi (11.25 km^{2})

Population (2013)
  - Total: 56
  - Density: 13/sq mi (5.0/km^{2})
- Time zone: UTC+1 (CET)
  - Summer (DST): UTC+2 (CEST)

Donja Suvaja (Serbian Cyrillic: Доња Суваја) is a village in the municipality of Bosanska Krupa, Bosnia and Herzegovina.

== Demographics ==
According to the 2013 census, its population was 56.

Ethnicity in 2013
Ethnicity	Number	Percentage
Serbs	52	92.9%
Croats	1	1.8%
other/undeclared	3	5.4%
Total	56	100%
