= Inter-Entity Boundary Line =

Inter-entity line of demarcation

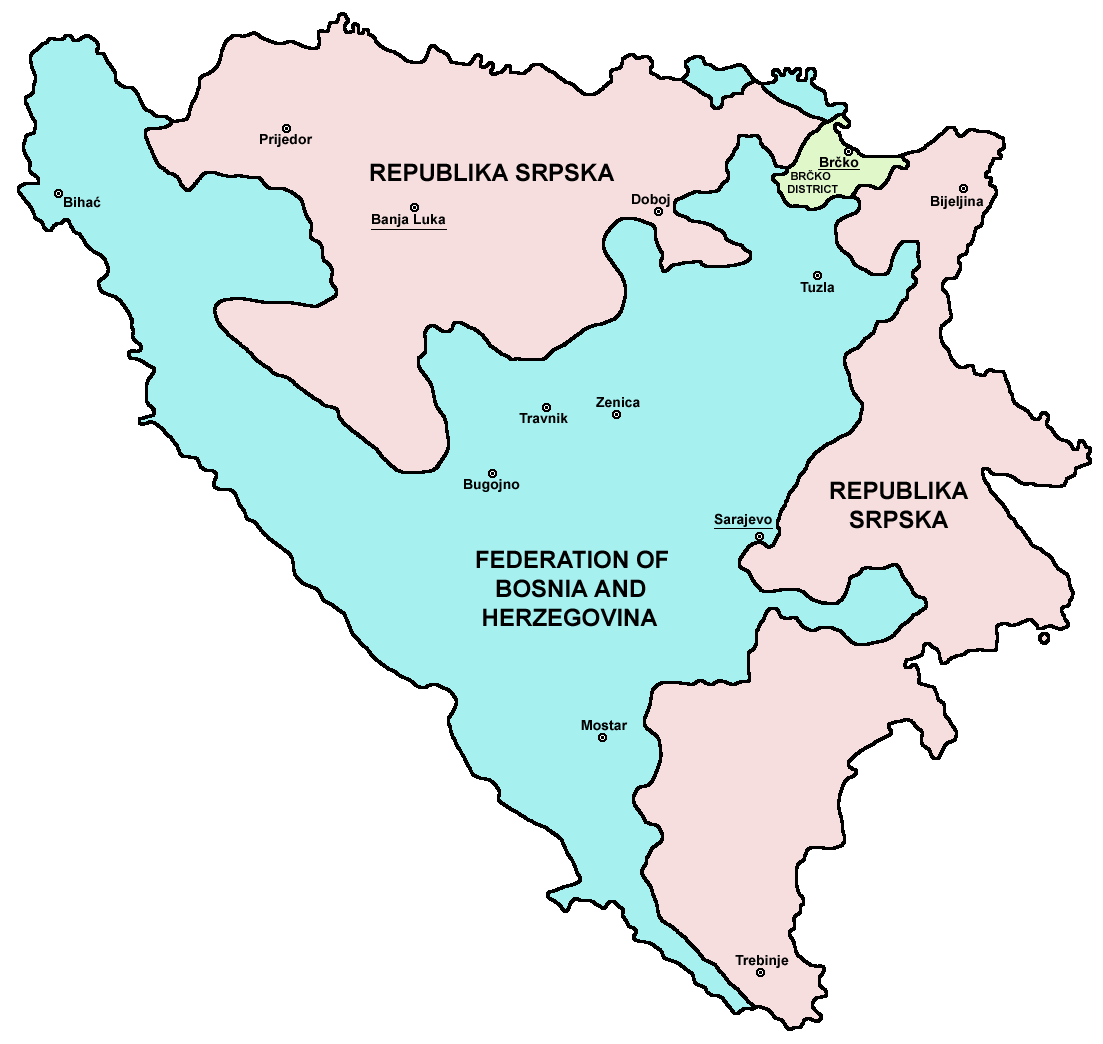
The Inter-Entity Boundary Line separates Republika Srpska and the Federation of Bosnia and Herzegovina

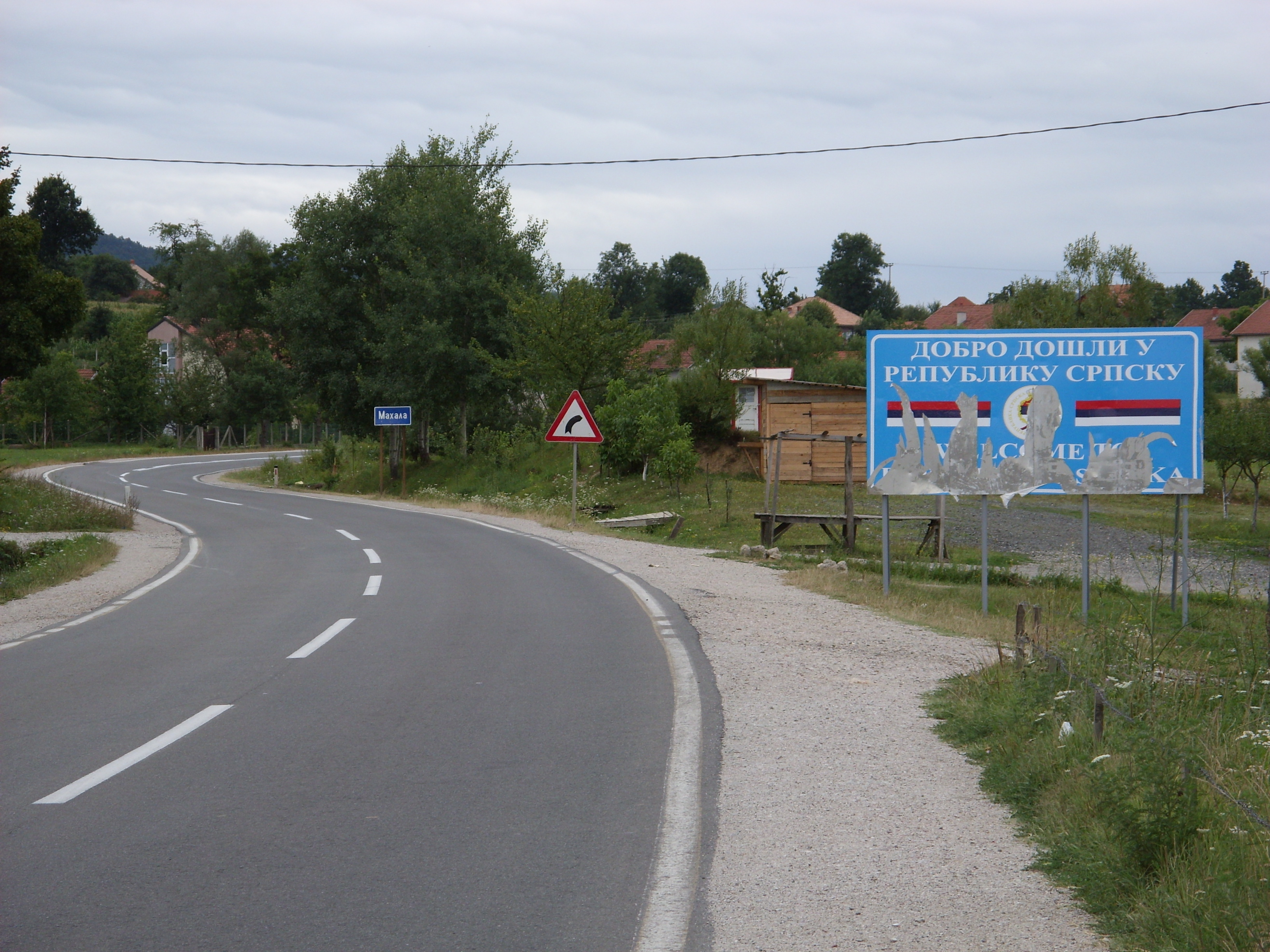
Inter-Entity Boundary Line photographed in July 2008 near the village of Mahala between Kalesija and Osmaci.

The Inter-Entity Boundary Line (IEBL; Serbo-Croatian: Međuentitetska linija razgraničenja, Међуентитетска линија разграничења) is the administrative line that subdivides Bosnia and Herzegovina into two entities, Republika Srpska and the Federation of Bosnia and Herzegovina. The total length of the Inter-Entity Boundary Line is 1,080 km (670 miles).

== History ==
The present political divisions of Bosnia and Herzegovina are based on Annex 4 of the General Framework Agreement for Peace, also known as Dayton Agreement, concluded at the Dayton Peace Conference in November 1995, and subsequently signed in Paris on December 14, 1995. A key component of this was the delineation of the Inter-Entity Boundary Line (IEBL), to which many of the tasks listed in the other Annexes referred.

In particular the IEBL affected the tasks of the Military Annexes, such as the initial and immediate "Separation of Forces", the creation of an initial "Zone of Separation", the "Transfer of Areas" between the entities and the district, and the "Removal of Forces" to "Containment Areas".

During this initial "Implementation Period", enforced by NATO-led Implementation Force or IFOR, it was required that along the IEBL a so-called 2 km "Zone of Separation" be established, which stretched toward both entities, making a zone 4 km wide in total.

The IEBL mostly follows along the military front-lines as they were at the end of the Bosnian War (with some major adjustments, most notably in the western part of the country, and in-and-around Sarajevo).

The IEBL between Republika Srpska, the Federation of Bosnia and Herzegovina and the Brčko District is no longer controlled by the military and is not policed. "Zone of Separation" is no longer in effect. There are no border controls and crossings of any kind.

== Mapping technology ==
Dayton marked the first occasion when three-dimensional satellite image technology and digital cartography was used to determine and delineate boundaries in an official treaty. Due to the speed and intensity of the negotiations (especially towards the end), a series of Inter-Entity Boundary Line commissions still needed to be held over the first 6 months of the NATO-led Implementation Force (IFOR) operation to iron out the remaining details of some of the boundaries (especially within Sarajevo). Over 40 changes to the IEBL were negotiated by the parties in meetings facilitated by the Chief of Staff HQ ARRC, Major General Michael Willcocks. These were signed off by IFOR Commander Admiral Leighton W. Smith, Jr. in July 1996.

== Ruling of the Constitutional Court ==
The Constitutional Court of Bosnia and Herzegovina has, in its first partial decision number U 5/98, ruled on the issue whether the Constitution of the Republika Srpska can use the word "border" instead of the "boundary" in its text. The Court declared:

Provision of the Constitution of RS, referring to the "border" between the Republika Srpska and the Federation of BiH, is not in conformity with the Constitution of BiH (Article III of the General Framework Agreement for Peace in Bosnia and Herzegovina speaks of "boundary lines" between the two Entities, while Article X uses the term border in the sense of borders between states).

Thus, the Constitution of the RS had to be amended, which was done with the Amendment number LXVIII, which changed the word "border" to "inter-entity line of demarcation" in the Amendment number LV on the Article 2 paragraph 2 of the Constitution of RS.

== Municipalities divided by the line ==
48 out of 109 municipalities were divided into two or more segments.

Municipality in the Federation of Bosnia and Herzegovina	Municipality in Republika Srpska
Bosanska Krupa	Krupa na Uni
Sanski Most	Oštra Luka
Ključ	Ribnik
Bosanski Petrovac	Petrovac
Drvar	Istočni Drvar
Kupres (FBiH)	Kupres (RS)
Jajce	Jezero
Dobretići	Kneževo
Doboj South and Doboj East	Doboj
Gračanica and Lukavac	Petrovo
Gradačac	Pelagićevo
Orašje	Donji Žabar
Domaljevac-Šamac	Šamac
Odžak	Vukosavlje
Čelić	Lopare
Teočak	Ugljevik
Sapna	Zvornik
Kalesija	Osmaci
Stari Grad	Istočni Stari Grad
Novo Sarajevo	Istočno Novo Sarajevo
Ilidža	Istočna Ilidža
Trnovo (FBiH)	Trnovo (RS)
Pale-Prača	Pale
Goražde	Novo Goražde
Foča-Ustikolina	Foča
Mostar	Istočni Mostar
Stolac	Berkovići
Ravno	Trebinje

At the time of the creation of the Dayton Accord, Brčko was also divided between FBiH and RS. Lately, however, the city was re-consolidated as the entity-neutral Brčko District, in such a way as to connect cantons Tuzla and Posavina in FBiH and municipalities Pelagićevo, Donji Žabar, Lopare, and Bijeljina in Republika Srpska.

The IEBL boundary around Sarajevo's Dobrinja was also adjusted by an international independent arbitrator, appointed by High Representative, to solve confusion around the initial boundary that passed through buildings in that neighborhood.
