= Krupa na Uni =

Municipality in Bosnia and Herzegovina

Krupa na Uni Крупа на Уни
- Municipality
- Flag Coat of arms

- Location of Krupa na Uni within Bosnia and Herzegovina

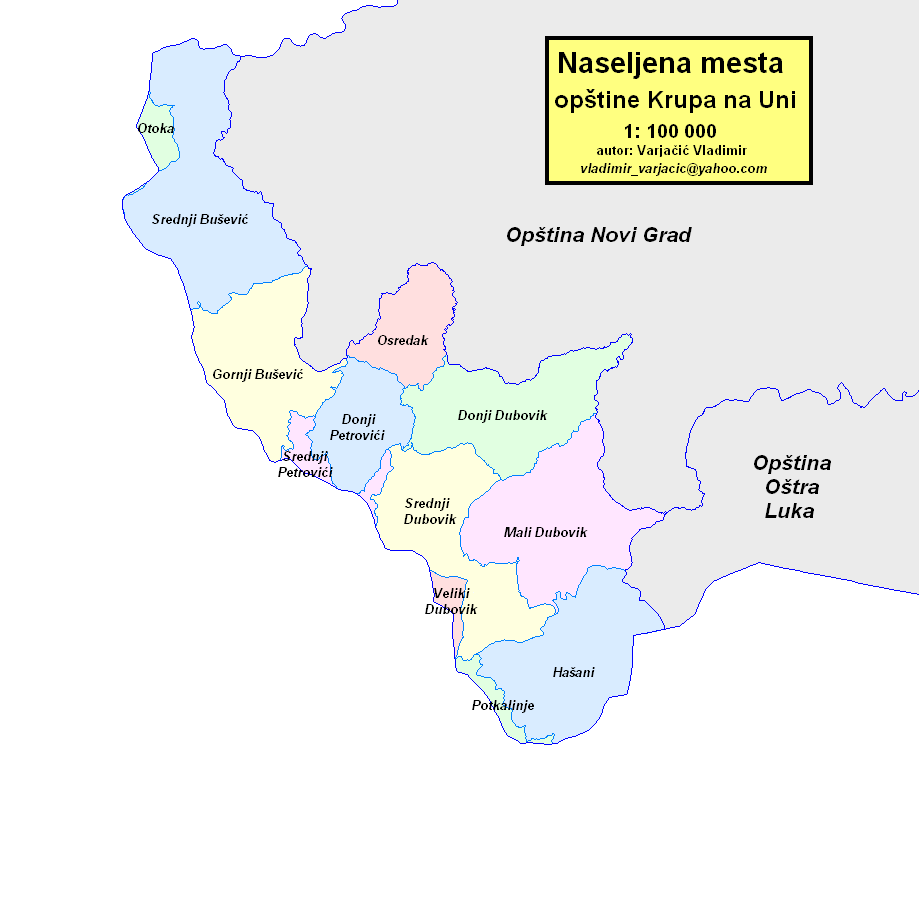
- Coordinates: 44°53′N 16°09′E
- Country: Bosnia and Herzegovina
- Entity: Republika Srpska
- Geographical region: Bosanska Krajina

Government
  - Municipal mayor: Gojko Kličković (NPS)

Area
  - Total: 84.33 km^{2} (32.56 sq mi)

Population (2013 census)
  - Total: 1,597
  - Density: 18.94/km^{2} (49.05/sq mi)
- Time zone: UTC+1 (CET)
  - Summer (DST): UTC+2 (CEST)
- Area code: 52
- Website: www.opstinakrupanauni.com

Krupa na Uni (Serbian Cyrillic: Крупа на Уни) is a municipality in Republika Srpska, Bosnia and Herzegovina. It is situated in the northwestern part of Republika Srpska and the central part of the Bosanska Krajina region. The seat of the municipality is the village of Donji Dubovik.

== History ==
It was created in 1995, formerly being a part of the pre-war municipality of Bosanska Krupa (the other part of the pre-war municipality that is now in the entity of the Federation of Bosnia and Herzegovina). As of 2019, it is one of the smallest municipalities by the number of inhabitants in Republika Srpska.

== Geography ==
It is located between the municipality of Bosanska Krupa to the south and west, the municipality of Novi Grad to the north, and the municipality of Oštra Luka to the east.

== Demographics ==
=== Population ===
Population of settlements – Krupa na Uni
	Settlement	1991.	2013.
	Total	1,776	1,597
1	Donji Dubovik	338	214
2	Gornji Bušević	493	200
3	Hašani	414	206
4	Srednji Bušević	470	248

=== Ethnic composition ===
Ethnic composition – Krupa na Uni municipality
	2013.	1991.
Total	1,597 (100,0%)	1,776 (100,0%)
Serbs	1,592 (99,69%)	1,256 (70,72%)
Bosniaks	3 (0,188%)	513 (28,89%)
Croats	2 (0,125%)	2 (0,113%)
Others		3 (0,169%)
Yugoslavs		2 (0,113%)

== Notable people ==
- Pecija, revolutionary
- Branko Ćopić, Bosnian and Yugoslav writer
- Gojko Kličković, former President of the Government of Republika Srpska
- Velimir Stojnić, National Hero of Yugoslavia

== See also ==
- Subdivisions of Bosnia and Herzegovina
- Municipalities of Republika Srpska
