= Bosanska Krupa =

City in Federation of Bosnia and Herzegovina, Bosnia and Herzegovina

Bosanska Krupa Босанска Крупа
- City
- Grad Bosanska Krupa; Град Босанска Крупа; City of Bosanska Krupa
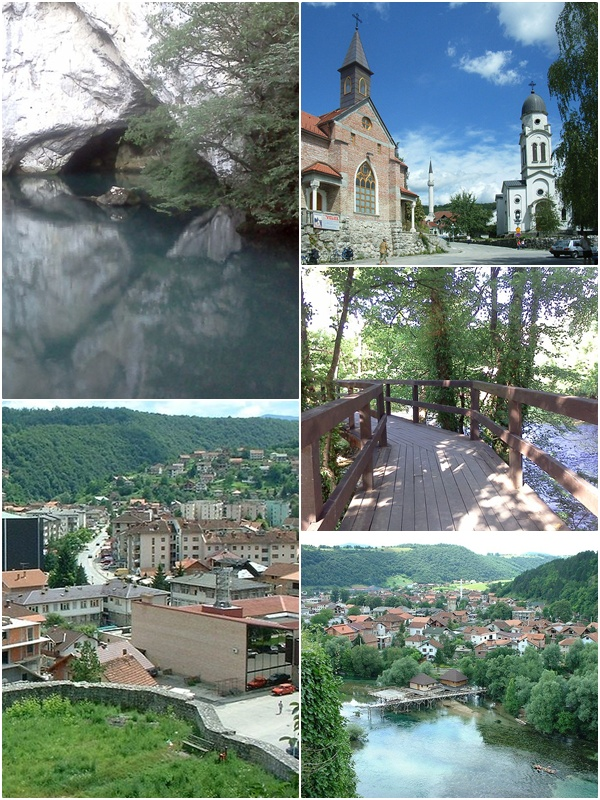
- Top left: Krvsnica Valley in Una Forest Park; top right: Temple of the Nativity of the Holy Virgin (left) and City Mosque; middle right: footbridge in Ade River; bottom left: panorama view from fortress of Bosanska Krupa; bottom right: city view, watermills in Una River

- Flag Coat of arms

- Location of Bosanska Krupa within Bosnia and Herzegovina.
- Coordinates: 44°53′N 16°09′E
- Country: Bosnia and Herzegovina
- Entity: Federation of Bosnia and Herzegovina
- Canton: Una-Sana
- Geographical region: Bosanska Krajina

Government
  - Mayor: Armin Halitović (SDP BiH)

Area
  - City: 561 km^{2} (217 sq mi)

Population (2026)
  - City: 23,268
  - Density: 42.8/km^{2} (111/sq mi)
  - Urban: 10,196
- Time zone: UTC+1 (CET)
  - Summer (DST): UTC+2 (CEST)
- Area code: +387 37
- Website: gradbosanskakrupa.ba

Bosanska Krupa (Serbian Cyrillic: Босанска Крупа) is a city located in the Una-Sana Canton of the Federation of Bosnia and Herzegovina, an entity of Bosnia and Herzegovina. As of 2026, it has a population of ~23,268 inhabitants.

It is situated on the banks of river Una in northwestern Bosnia and Herzegovina, 30 km (19 mi) northeast from Bihać (350 km away from Sarajevo).

== History ==
When the German and Italian Zones of Influence were revised on 24 June 1942, Bosanska Krupa fell in Zone III, administered civilly by Croatia and militarily by Croatia and Germany.

== Geography ==
Bosanska Krupa is on the border within the Federation of Bosnia and Herzegovina adjacent to the municipalities of Bužim, Cazin, Bihać, Bosanski Petrovac, Sanski Most, and Krupa na Uni. The last mentioned municipality is part of the Republika Srpska entity and was part of the Bosanska Krupa municipality before the Bosnian War, but after the Dayton Agreement it became a separate municipality.

== Settlements ==
- Arapuša
- Banjani
- Baštra
- Benakovac
- Donja Suvaja
- Drenova Glavica
- Glavica
- Gorinja
- Gornja Suvaja
- Gornji Bušević
- Gornji Petrovići
- Gudavac
- Hašani
- Ivanjska
- Jasenica
- Jezerski
- Ljusina
- Mahmić Selo
- Mali Badić
- Mali Radić
- Ostrožnica
- Bosanska Otoka
- Perna
- Pištaline
- Potkalinje
- Pučenik
- Srednji Bušević
- Srednji Dubovik
- Velika Jasenica
- Veliki Badić
- Veliki Dubovik
- Veliki Radić
- Vojevac
- Voloder
- Vranjska
- Zalin

== Demographics ==
=== Population ===
Population of settlements – Bosanska Krupa municipality
	Settlement	1961.	1971.	1981.	1991.	2013.
	Total	46,020	50,856	55,229	58,320	29,659
1	Arapuša				536	273
2	Banjani				501	332
3	Baštra				186	204
4	Bosanska Krupa		8,974	12,055	14,416	10,196
5	Drenova Glavica				376	253
6	Ivanjska				633	309
7	Jezerski				3,322	2,756
8	Ljusina				1,315	1,237
9	Mahmić Selo				1,714	1,369
10	Ostrožnica				1,201	794
11	Otoka				4,063	3,221
12	Pištaline				1,541	1,316
13	Veliki Badić				1,237	794
14	Voloder				1,060	1,114

=== Ethnic composition ===
Ethnic composition – Bosanska Krupa town
	2013.	1991.	1981.	1971.
Total	10,196 (100,0%)	14,416 (100,0%)	12,055 (100,0%)	8,974 (100,0%)
Bosniaks	9,859 (96,70%)	9,519 (66,03%)	6,858 (56,89%)	6,070 (67,64%)
Roma	116 (1,138%)			
Unaffiliated	56 (0,549%)			
Serbs	54 (0,530%)	4,044 (28,05%)	3,142 (26,06%)	2,433 (27,11%)
Croats	50 (0,490%)	102 (0,708%)	109 (0,904%)	202 (2,251%)
Albanians	21 (0,206%)			
Others	19 (0,186%)	200 (1,387%)	182 (1,510%)	86 (0,958%)
Unknown	16 (0,157%)			
Yugoslavs	2 (0,020%)	551 (3,822%)	1,764 (14,63%)	183 (2,039%)
Macedonians	1 (0,010%)			
Slovenes	1 (0,010%)			
Turks	1 (0,010%)			

Ethnic composition – Bosanska Krupa municipality
	2013.	1991.	1981.	1971.	1961.
Total	29,659 (100,0%)	58,320 (100,0%)	55,229 (100,0%)	50,856 (100,0%)	46,020 (100,0%)
Bosniaks	23,886 (93,50%)	43,104 (73,91%)	37,381 (67,68%)	31,842 (62,61%)	23,721 (51,54%)
Serbs	1,265 (4,952%)	13,841 (23,73%)	15,029 (27,21%)	18,230 (35,85%)	20,453 (44,44%)
Roma	118 (0,462%)		3 (0,005%)		
Unaffiliated	106 (0,415%)				
Croats	66 (0,258%)	139 (0,238%)	173 (0,313%)	286 (0,562%)	453 (0,980%)
Unknown	41 (0,161%)				
Others	30 (0,117%)	528 (0,905%)	251 (0,454%)	216 (0,425%)	122 (0,270%)
Albanians	23 (0,090%)		13 (0,024%)	13 (0,026%)	
Yugoslavs	5 (0,020%)	708 (1,214%)	2,314 (4,190%)	239 (0,470%)	1,271 (2,760%)
Slovenes	3 (0,012%)		9 (0,016%)	11 (0,022%)	
Macedonians	1 (0,004%)		7 (0,013%)		
Turks	1 (0,004%)				
Montenegrins			49 (0,089%)	19 (0,037%)	

== Notable people ==
- Džemaludin Čaušević, Grand Mufti for Bosnia and Herzegovina (1914 to 1930)
- Branko Ćopić, writer (Hašani)
- Kosta Hakman, painter
- Elvis Mešić, football player

== Gallery ==
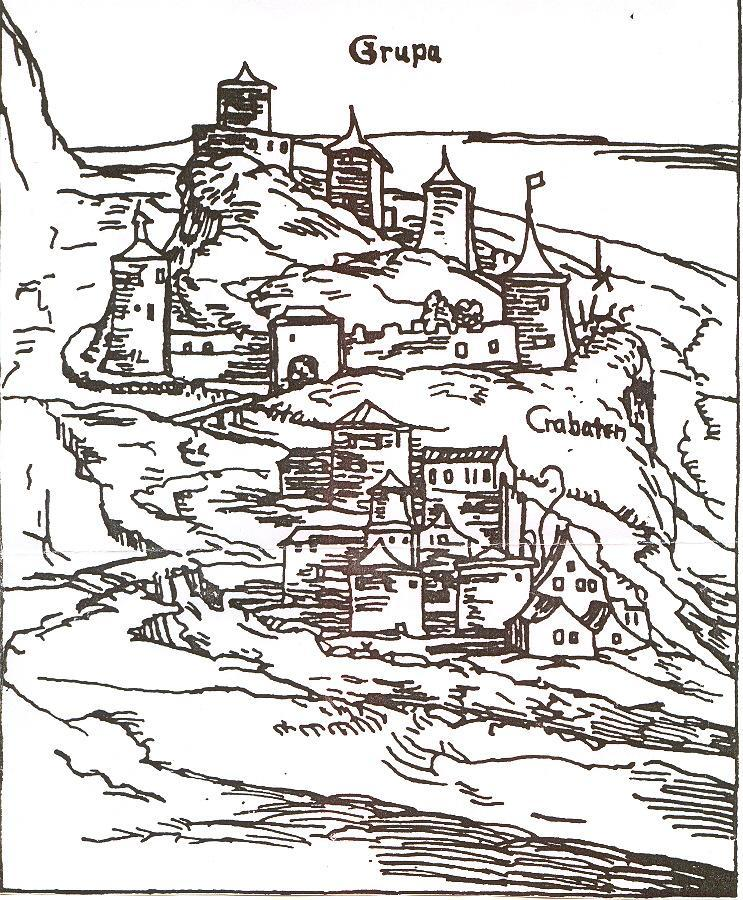
Krupa in the Middle Ages

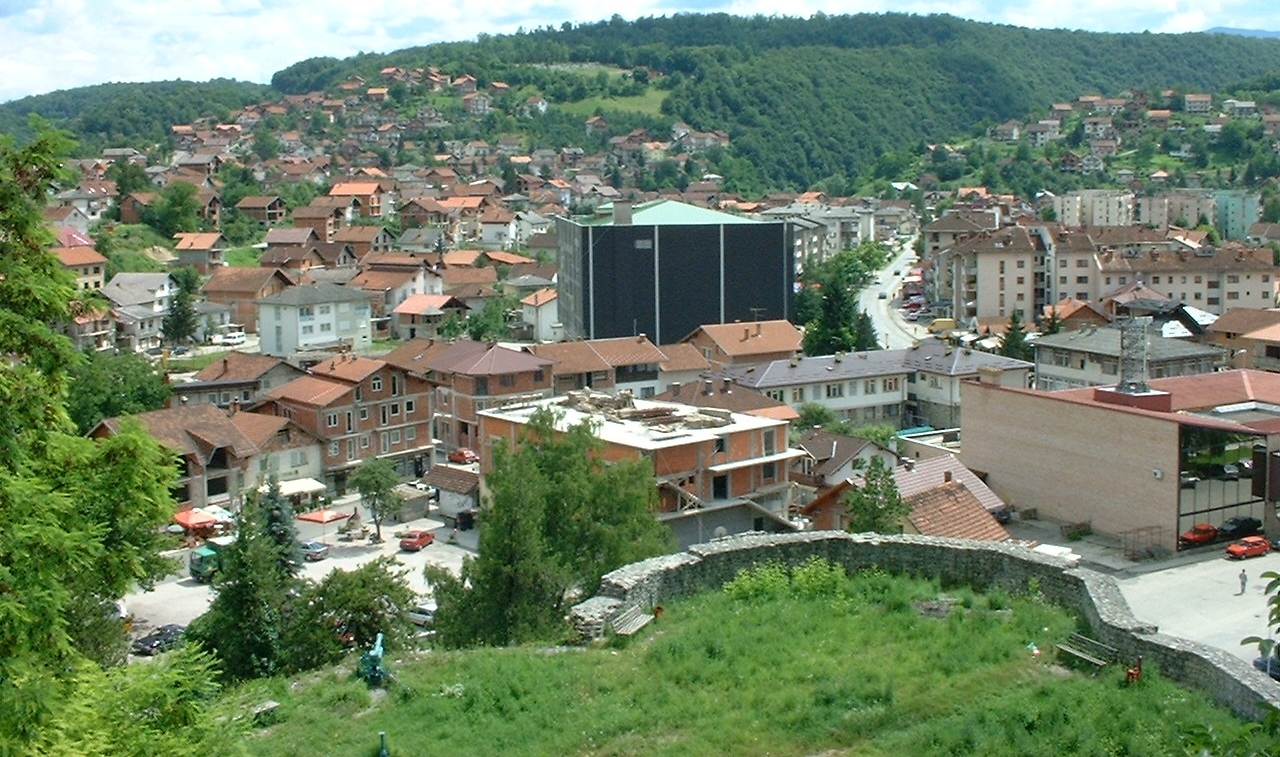
Bosanska Krupa

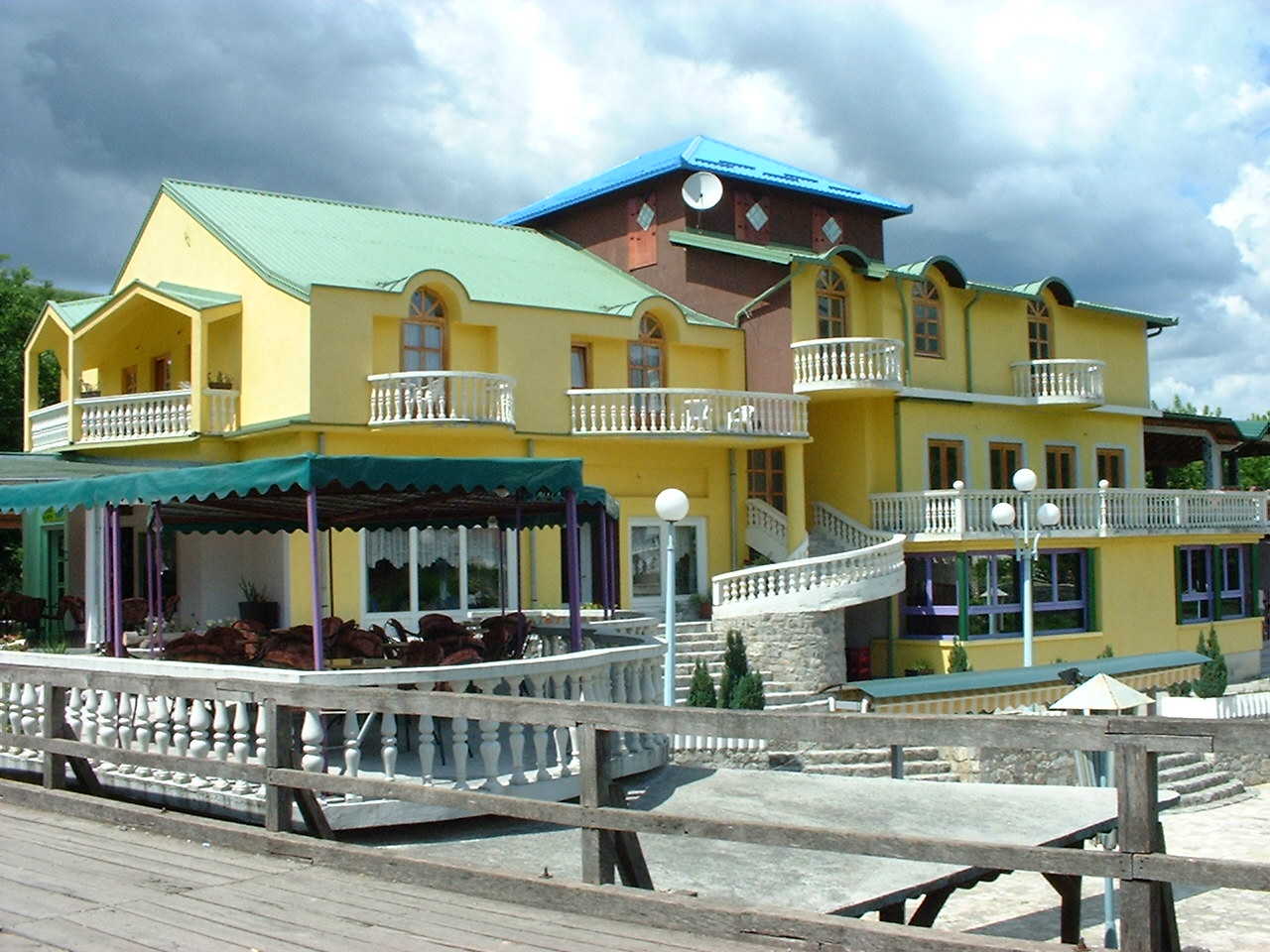
Bosanska Krupa

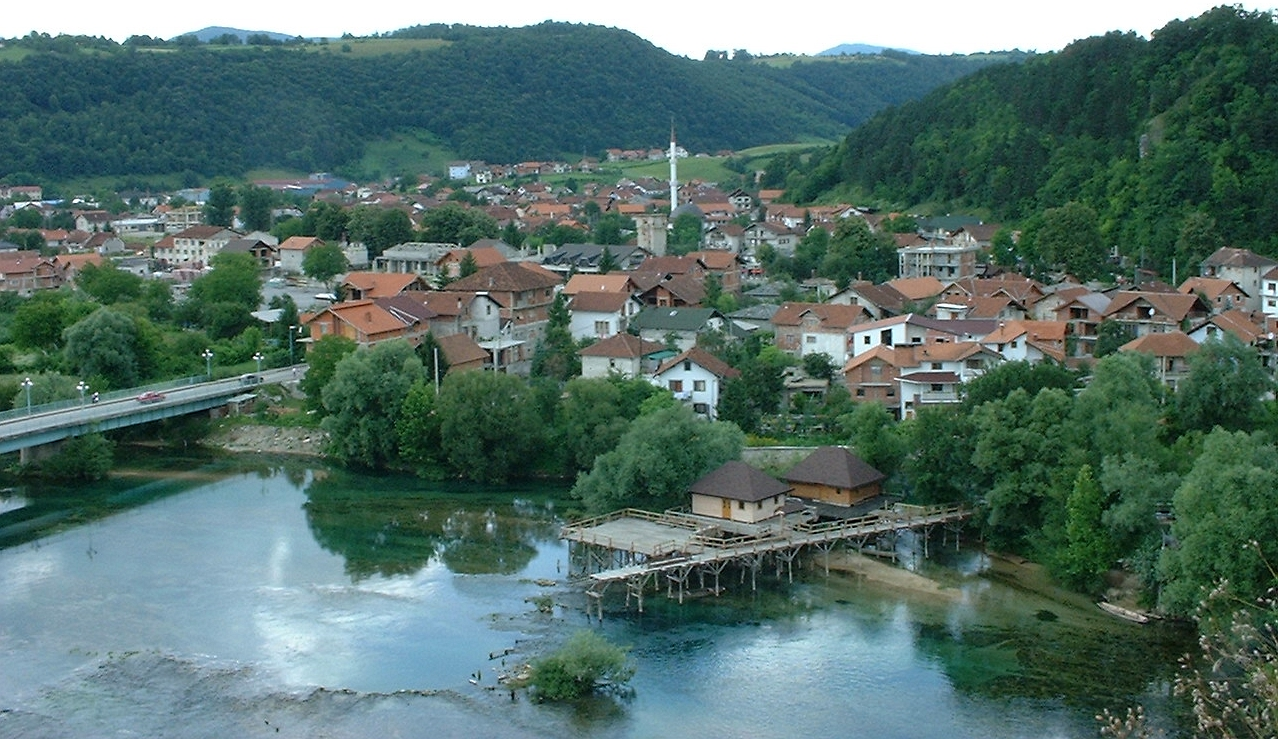
Bosanska Krupa

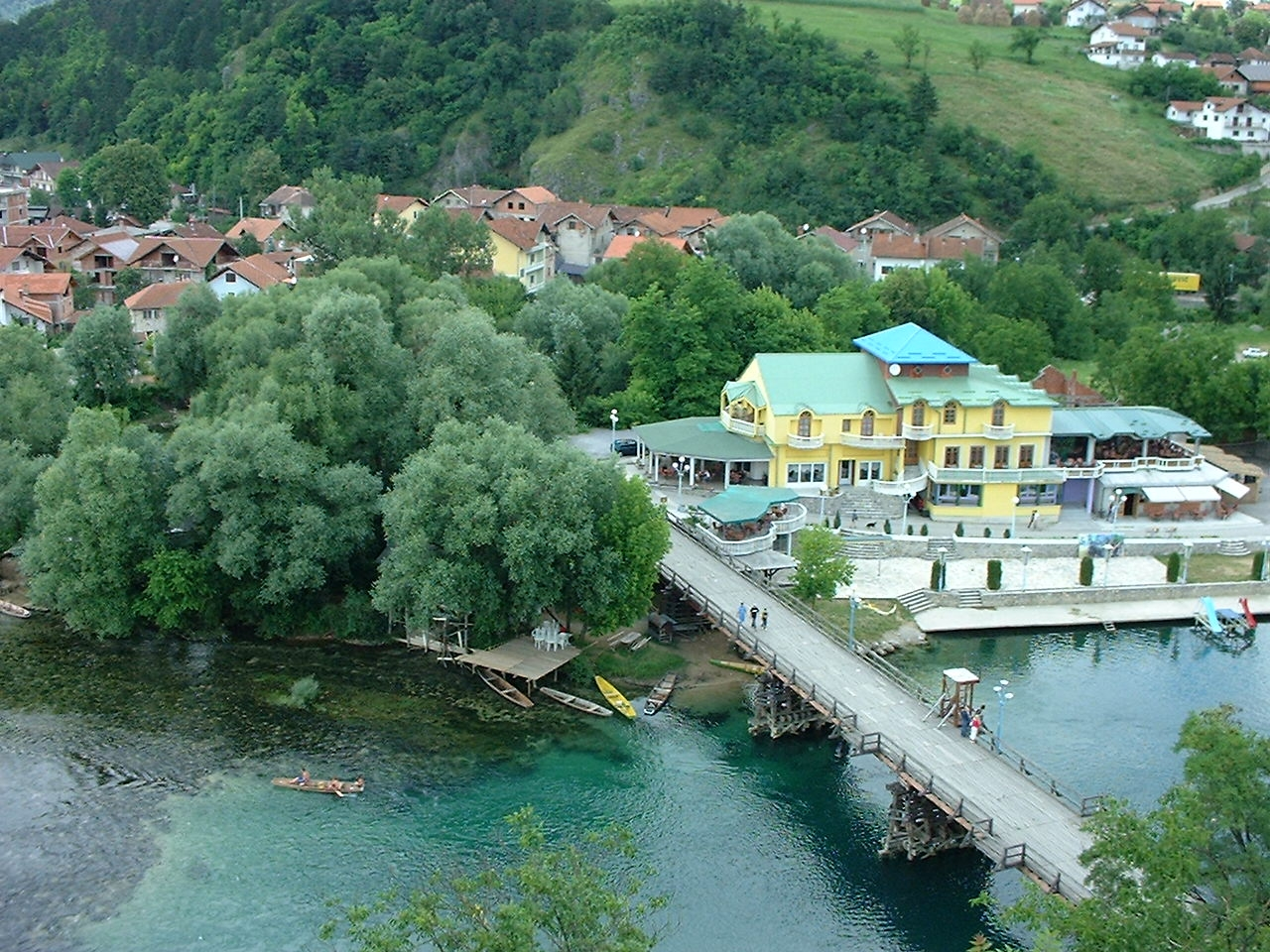
Bosanska Krupa

== See also ==
- Una-Sana Canton
- Bosanska Krajina

== Bibliography ==
- Trgo, Fabijan, ed. (1964). Zbornik dokumenata i podataka o Narodno-oslobodilačkom ratu Jugoslovenskih naroda. Vol. V, 32.
