= Kupjak =

Coordinates: 45°23′38″N 14°53′01″E

- Village
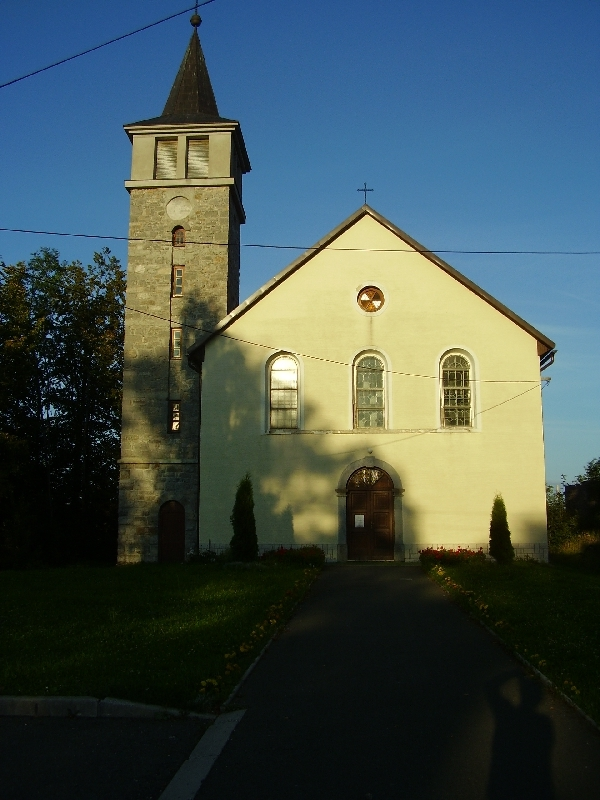
- Church of St. Vitus in Kupjak
- Interactive map of Kupjak
- Country: Croatia
- County: Primorje-Gorski Kotar County
- Municipality: Ravna Gora

Area
  - Total: 8.3 km^{2} (3.2 sq mi)

Population (2021)
  - Total: 176
  - Density: 21/km^{2} (55/sq mi)
- Time zone: UTC+1 (CET)
  - Summer (DST): UTC+2 (CEST)

Kupjak is a village in Croatia. It is connected by the D3 highway.

== History ==
In 1860–1879, Matija Mažuranić wrote a 62 folio manuscript today titled Writings on the Building of Roads in Gorski Kotar and Lika (Croatian: Spisi o gradnji cesta u Gorskom Kotaru i Lici), today with signature HR-ZaNSK R 6424. A 21 folio manuscript dated 1872 titled Darstellung der Entstehung des Baues ... der Luisenstrasse together with a translation by I. Mikloušić is kept as HR-ZaNSK R 4572.

The volunteer fire department DVD Kupjak was founded in 1929, and is today part of the VZ općine Ravna Gora. Its current commander is Igor Špoljarić.

The Italians withdrew from Kupjak on 25 January 1942. The Italians did not leave those towns along the railway, which they fortified with barbed wire.

On 12 December 2017, a severe wind hit Kupjak, blocking traffic to and from it along the Kupjak-Stubica road.

== Demographics ==
Village of Kupjak: Population trends 1857–2021
v

population	560	506	496	417	400	425	377	412	386	394	358	373	353	312	270	227	176
	1857	1869	1880	1890	1900	1910	1921	1931	1948	1953	1961	1971	1981	1991	2001	2011	2021

Note:Od 1857. do 1880. sadrži podatke za naselja Hlevci, općina Skrad, Leskova Draga, Podstena, općina Skrad, i Šije te za bivše naselje Kosica Skradska Sources: Croatian Bureau of Statistics publications

== Governance ==
=== Local ===
It is the seat of the Local Committee of Kupjak, encompassing itself, Leskova Draga and Šije.

== Gallery ==
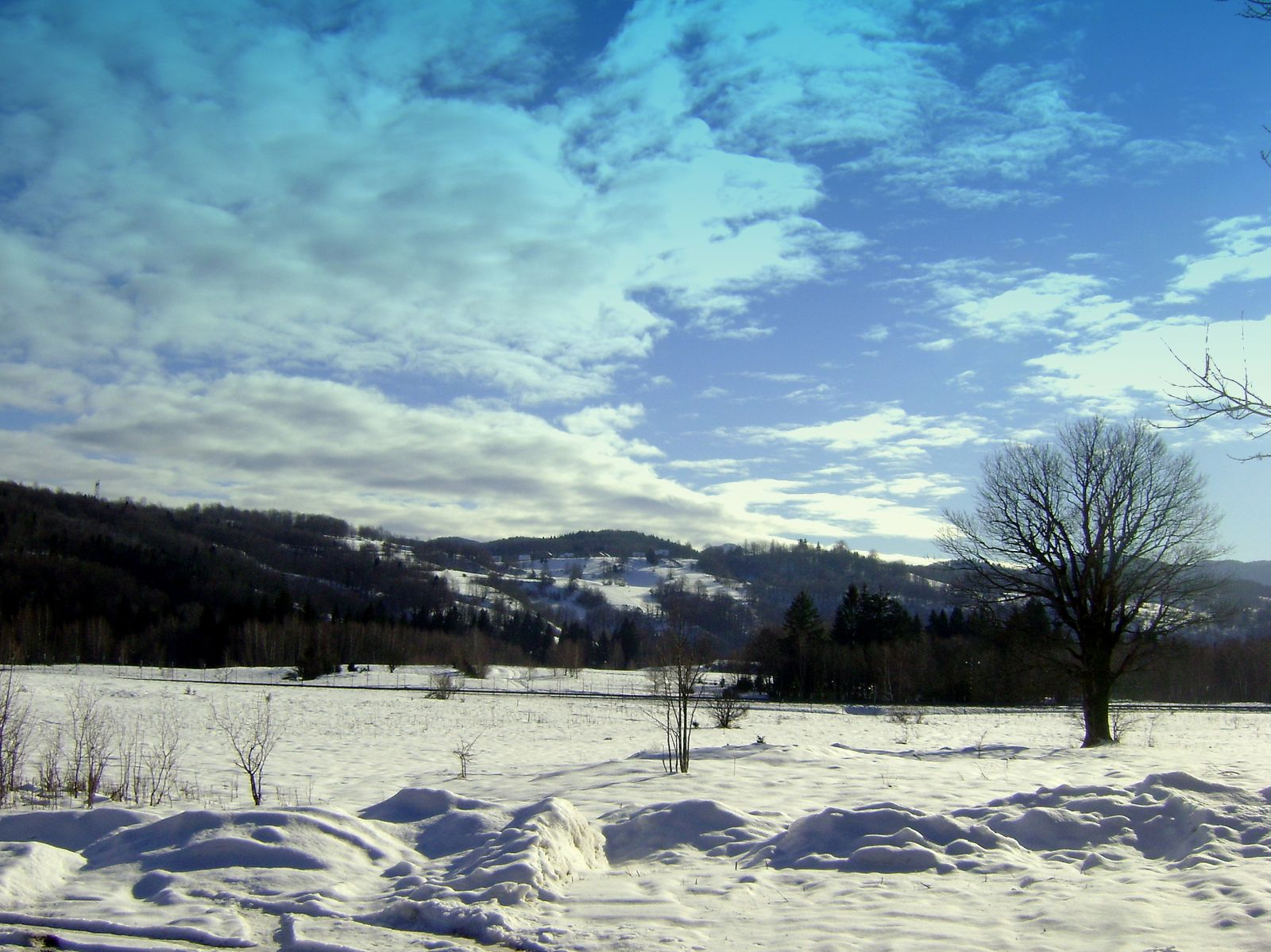
Field of Kupjak

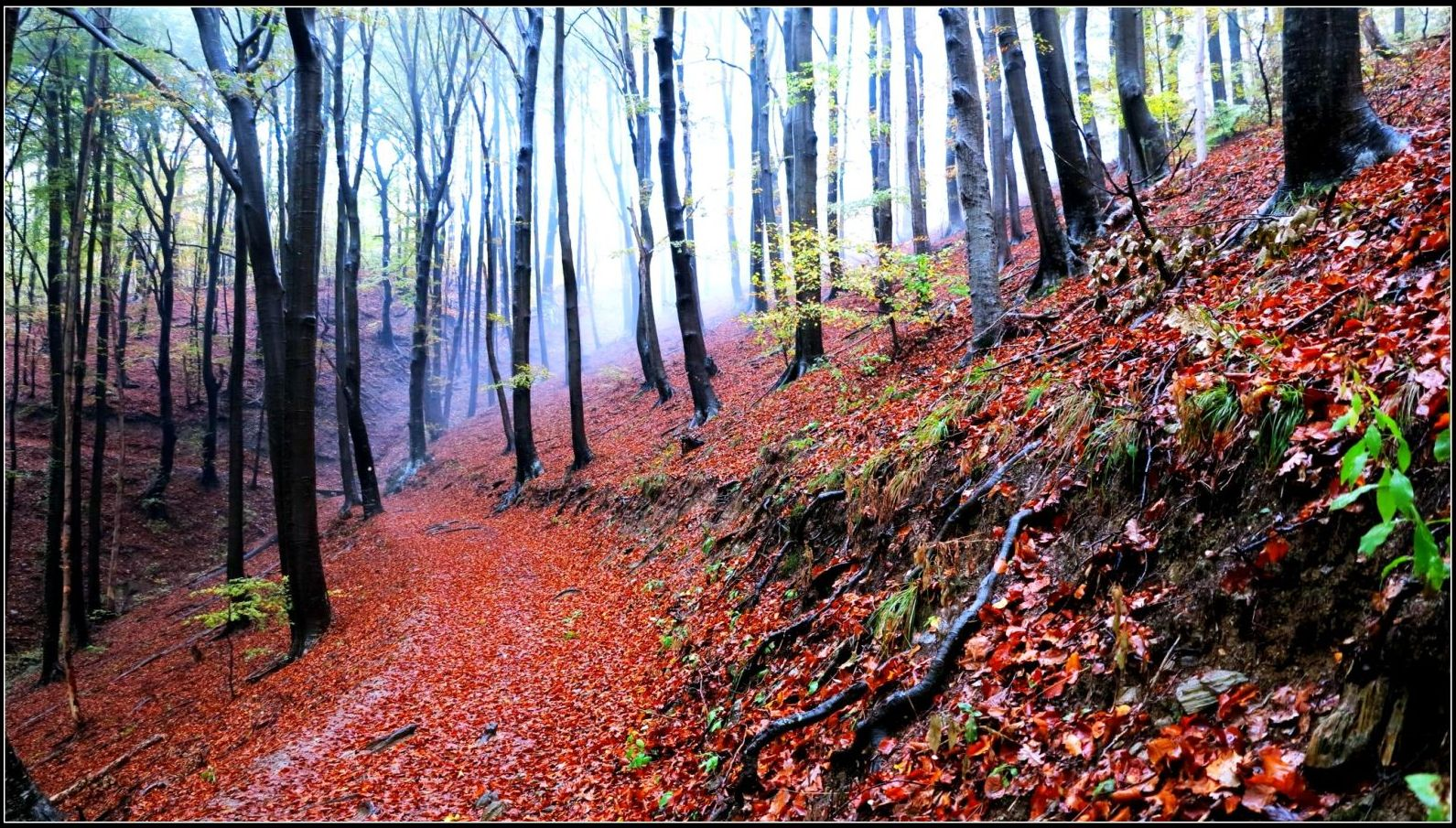
Trail near Kupjak

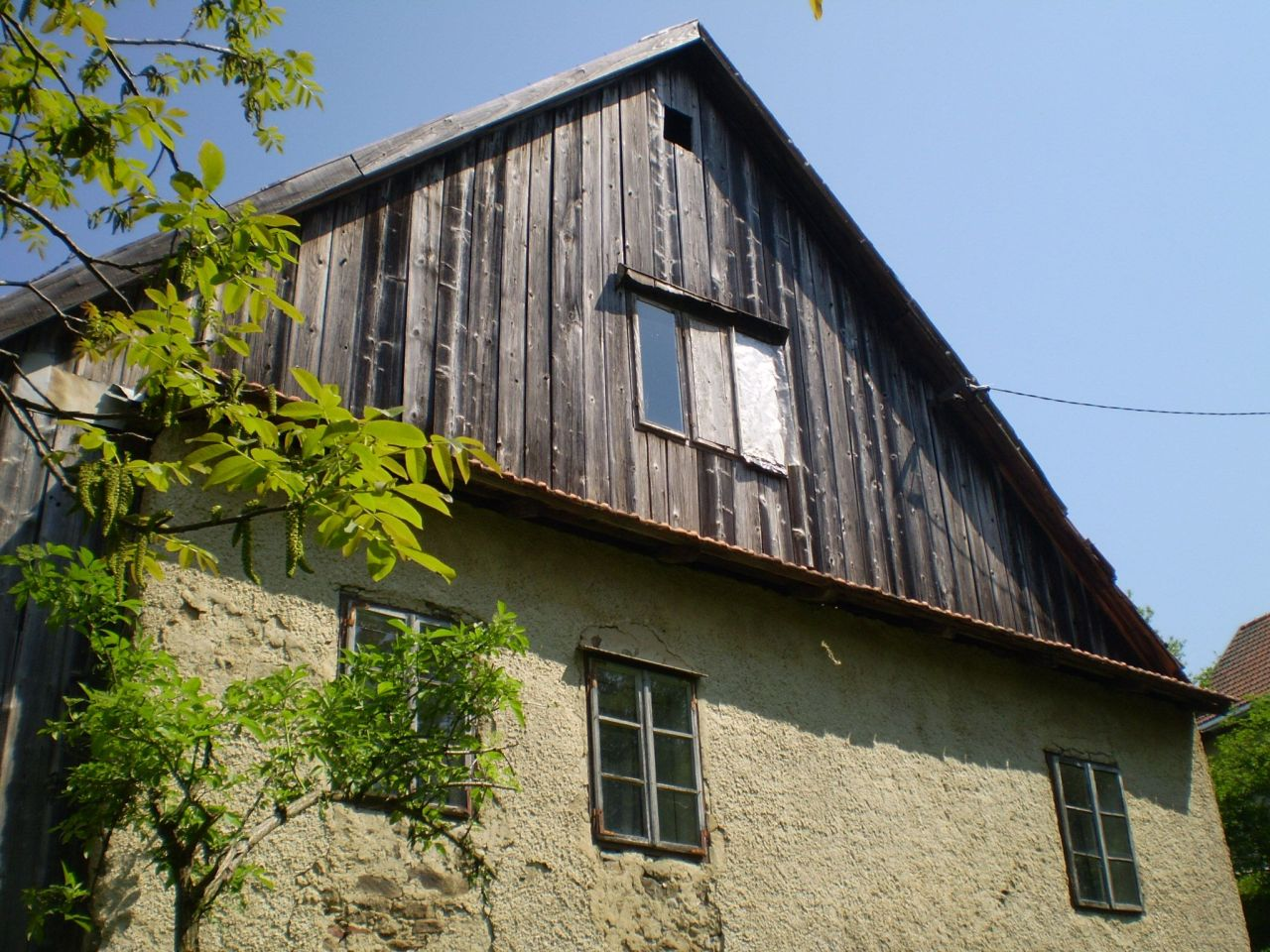
House in Rogi hamlet

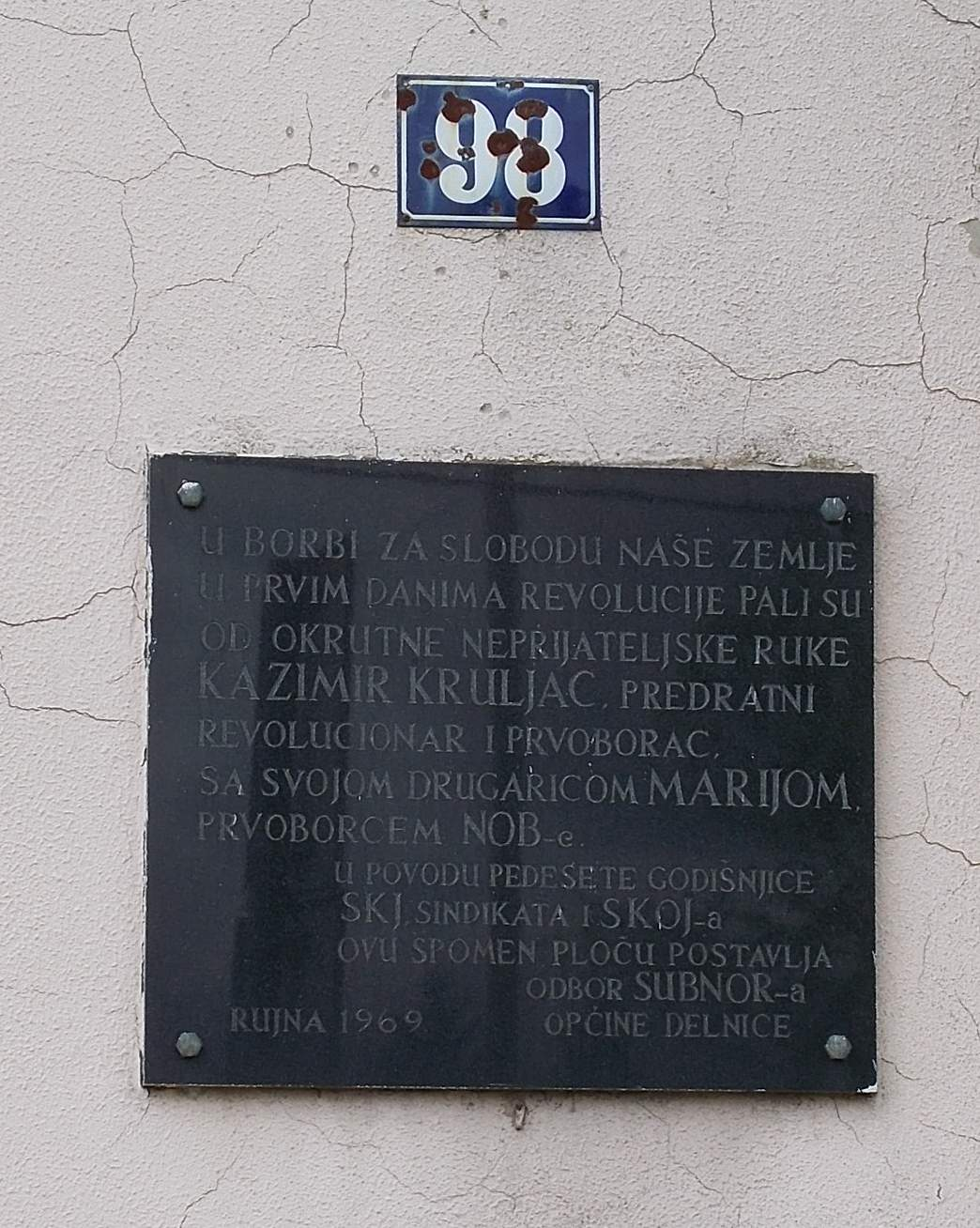
Plaque commemorating Marija and Kazimir Kruljac

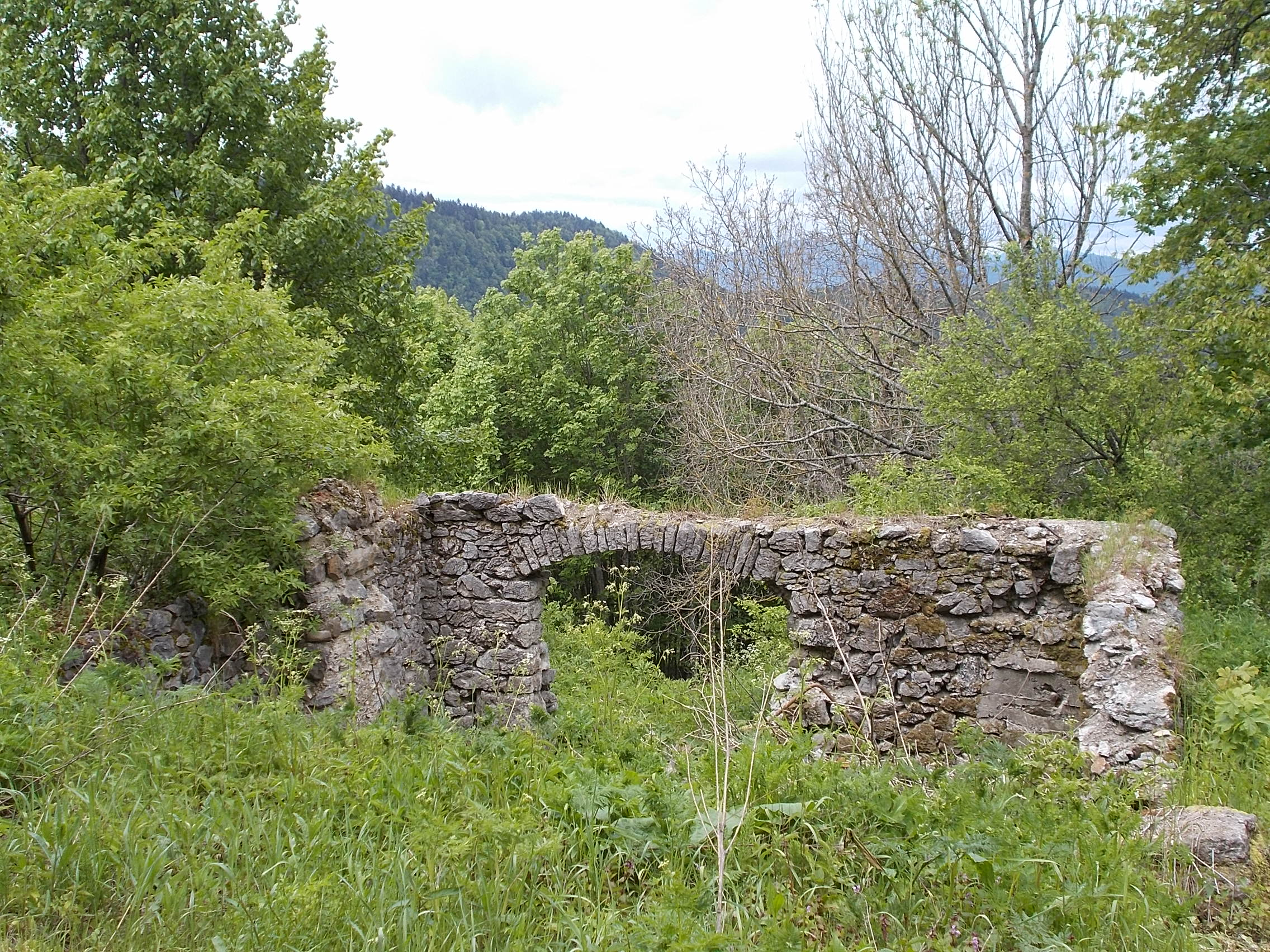
Ruins on the way to Šubetov most

== Bibliography ==
- Korenčić, Mirko (1979). Naselja i stanovništvo Socijalističke Republike Hrvatske (1857–1971) [Villages and Population of the Socialist Republic of Croatia (1857–1971)]. Djela Jugoslavenske akademije znanosti i umjetnosti (in Serbo-Croatian). Vol. 54.
- Trgo, Fabijan, ed. (1964). Zbornik dokumenata i podataka o Narodno-oslobodilačkom ratu Jugoslovenskih naroda. Vol. V, 32.
