= Šije =

Šije may refer to:

- Šije, Bosnia and Herzegovina, a village near Tešanj
- Šije, Croatia, a village near Ravna Gora
