= Sušice (disambiguation) =

Sušice is a town in the Plzeň Region in the Czech Republic.

Sušice may also refer to places in the Czech Republic:

- Sušice (Přerov District), a municipality and village in the Olomouc Region
- Sušice (Uherské Hradiště District), a municipality and village in the Zlín Region
- Sušice, a village and part of Dubá in the Liberec Region
- Sušice, a village and part of Míčov-Sušice in the Pardubice Region
- Sušice, a village and part of Moravská Třebová in the Pardubice Region
- Sušice, a village and part of Postupice in the Central Bohemian Region

== See also ==
- Sušica (disambiguation)
