= Sušica =

Sušica or Sushitsa (Cyrillic: Сушица) may refer to several places:

== Populated places ==
=== Bulgaria ===
- Sushitsa, Blagoevgrad Province, a village in southwestern Bulgaria
- Sushitsa, Kyustendil Province, a village in southwestern Bulgaria
- Sushitsa, Veliko Tarnovo Province, a village in north central Bulgaria
- Sushitsa, Karlovo, a neighbourhood of Karlovo, south central Bulgaria
- Gorna Sushitsa, a village in southwestern Bulgaria
- Zlatolist, Blagoevgrad Province, formerly Dolna Sushitsa, the former name of a village in southwestern Bulgaria

=== Romania ===
- Şuşiţa, Brezniţa Ocol, Mehedinţi (Serbian: Sušica), a village in Romania

=== North Macedonia ===
- Sušica, Novo Selo

=== Slovenia ===
- Sušica, Ivančna Gorica, a village near Ivančna Gorica

=== Serbia ===
- Sušica (Kruševac), a village near Kruševac
- Sušica (Sjenica), a village near Sjenica
- Sušica (Valjevo), a village near Valjevo

=== Croatia ===
- Stara Sušica, Croatia, formerly also called just Sušica

== Rivers ==
- Sušica River (Trebišnjica), left tributary of the Trebišnjica, Bosnia and Herzegovina
- Sušica (Globornica), a river in the Dobra watershed, Croatia
- Sušica (Rječina), a tributary to the Rječina, Coratia
- Sušica River (Montenegro), a river on mountain Durmitor, Montenegro
- Sušica River (Đetinja), right tributary of the Đetinja, Serbia
- Sušica River (Slovenia), a river near Dolenjske Toplice, Slovenia

== Islands ==
- Sušica (island), an island near Ugljan, Croatia
