= Stari Laz =

- Village
- Interactive map of Stari Laz
- Coordinates: 45°21′48″N 14°53′09″E
- Country: Croatia
- County: Primorje-Gorski Kotar County
- Municipality: Ravna Gora

Area
  - Total: 18.3 km^{2} (7.1 sq mi)
- Elevation: 843–1,025 m (2,766–3,363 ft)

Population (2021)
  - Total: 147
  - Density: 8.03/km^{2} (20.8/sq mi)
- Time zone: UTC+1 (CET)
  - Summer (DST): UTC+2 (CEST)
- Postal code: 51300 Delnice
- Area code: +385 (0)51

Stari Laz is a village in Croatia.

== History ==
The volunteer fire department DVD Brod Moravice was founded in 1952, and is today part of the VZ općine Ravna Gora. Its current commander as of 2013 is Hrvoje Stipeć.

At 20:27 on 27 April 2009, the ŽC Rijeka received a call about a barn fire in Stari Laz. The fire was put out at 21:10 by 15 firefighters and 3 vehicles from the JVP Delnice, DVD Ravna Gora, DVD Mrkopalj and DVD Stari Laz.

== Demographics ==
In 1890, Stari Laz itself had 90 houses and 597 people, who variously belonged to either Mrkopalj or Ravna Gora parish. Polička Kosa had 16 houses and 85 people, belonging to the Mrkopalj parish. Kosa had 23 houses and 111 people, belonging to Ravna Gora parish. Stari Laz and Polička Kosa attended school in and were taxed by Stari Laz and were administered by Ravna Gora, which two also taxed and administered Kosa but the latter attended school in Ravna Gora.

Village of Stari Laz: Population trends 1857–2021
v

population	710	794	642	690	648	631	546	602	623	617	547	459	336	312	251	201	147
	1857	1869	1880	1890	1900	1910	1921	1931	1948	1953	1961	1971	1981	1991	2001	2011	2021

Note:Kosica Skradska was added to it in 2001 because it had ceased to exist. Sources: Croatian Bureau of Statistics publications

=== Further reading ===
- Kraljevski zemaljski statistički ured (May 1913). "Repertorij prebivališta po županijama, upravnim kotarima, gradovima, upravnim i poreznim općinama". Političko i sudbeno razdjeljenje i Repertorij prebivališta Kraljevina Hrvatske i Slavonije po stanju od 1. siječnja 1913. Zagreb: Kraljevska hrvatsko-slavonsko-dalmatinska zemaljska vlada, 🖶 Kraljevska zemaljska tiskara. pp. 1–126. Page 32.

== Governance ==
=== Local ===
It is the seat of its own local committee.

== Sports ==
Beginning in 2013, the 7 stage 260 kilometres (160 mi) long Cycling Trail of Gorski Kotar (Croatian: Goranska biciklistička transverzala) passes through Stari Laz.

The "Gorski Kotar Bike Tour", held annually since 2012, sometimes goes through Stari Laz, such as in the third leg for 2023.

== Bibliography ==
- Korenčić, Mirko (1979). Naselja i stanovništvo Socijalističke Republike Hrvatske (1857–1971) [Villages and Population of the Socialist Republic of Croatia (1857–1971)]. Djela Jugoslavenske akademije znanosti i umjetnosti (in Serbo-Croatian). Vol. 54.
