= Ravna Gora, Croatia =

Ravna Gora Ravnagora
- Municipality
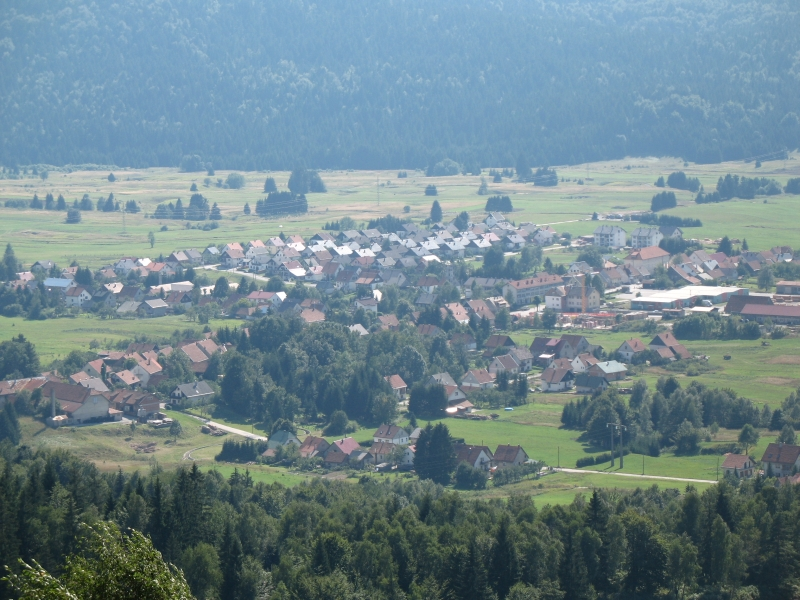
- Ravna Gora

- Flag Coat of arms
- Interactive map of Ravna Gora
- Coordinates: 45°22′N 14°56′E
- Country: Croatia
- County: Primorje-Gorski Kotar County
- Settlements: Kupjak, Leskova Draga, Ravna Gora, Stara Sušica, Stari Laz, Šije

Government
  - Mayor: Mišel Šćuka (HDZ)

Area
  - Municipality: 83.6 km^{2} (32.3 sq mi)
  - Urban: 45.1 km^{2} (17.4 sq mi)

Population (2021)
  - Municipality: 2,028
  - Density: 24.3/km^{2} (62.8/sq mi)
  - Urban: 1,477
  - Urban density: 32.7/km^{2} (84.8/sq mi)
- Time zone: UTC+1 (CET)
  - Summer (DST): UTC+2 (CEST)
- Postal code: 51314
- Area code: 051
- Website: ravnagora.hr

Ravna Gora is a village and a municipality in western Croatia, located between Delnice and Vrbovsko in the mountainous region of Gorski Kotar.

== History ==
The volunteer fire department DVD Ravna Gora was founded in 1888, and is today part of the VZ općine Ravna Gora. The current commander of both the VZ and the DVD as of 2013 is Dražen Krepenc.

The local chapter of the HPS is HPD "Bjelolasica", (Note: HPD "Bjelolasica" Ravna Gora is not to be confused with HPD "Ravna Gora" Varaždin.) which had 23 members in 1936 under the Ivan Marković presidency. At the time, it had a ski section. Membership fell to 21 in 1937. Membership fell to 15 in 1938, and the ski section became inactive. The next season, the entire chapter was inactive.

=== WWII ===
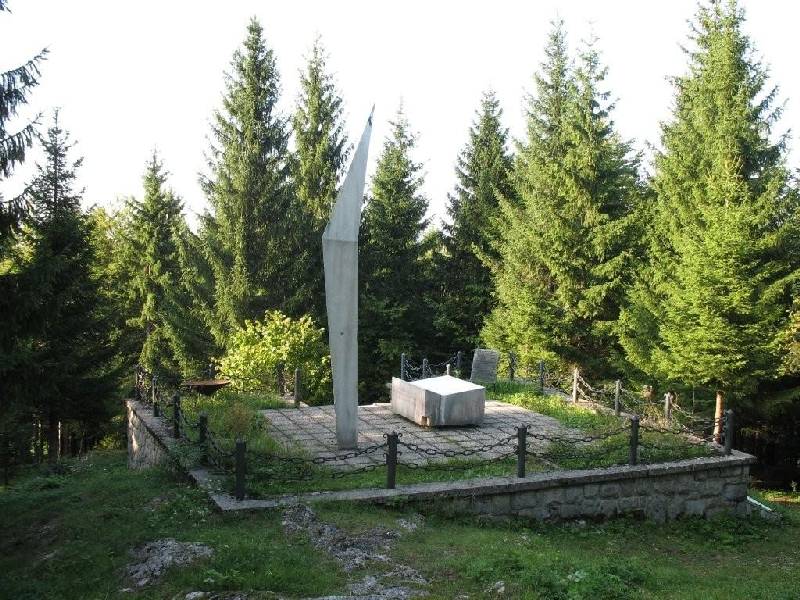
WWII monument in Ravna Gora

Along with Mrkopalj and Vrbovsko, Ravna Gora was one of the only places in Gorski Kotar that already had Ustaše when Ante Pavelić arrived in 1941.

In July, when the deportations of Serbs to accommodate the Slovenes of the population exchange commenced, the logornik in Vrbovsko informed his superiors that all the Serbs were in Moravice apart from two retired Serb gunmen in Severin na Kupi. For the temporary accommodation of Slovenes in Ravna Gora, the Deutscher dom was offered for the housing of 100 people but for its occupation by the Italians.

The Italians withdrew from Ravna Gora on 15 March 1942, on the same day as Sunger and Mrkopalj. The Italians did not leave those towns along the railway, which they fortified with barbed wire.

At 11:00 on 22 March 1942, a large mass of Communists entered Ravna Gora under the Croatian flag, holding a meeting in front of the Općina house, blocked off all of Ravna Gora and set up a guard at the entrance and exit.

In May 1942, following the success of arming Serbs to form auxiliary chete in Moravice, Gomirje and Lička Jesenica, the Italian army decided to form similar armed groups from among the Croats of Ravna Gora and Mrkopalj.

=== Recent ===
Ravna Gora was hit by the 2014 Dinaric ice storm. From 31 January to 2 February 2014, while S and SW geostrophic wind dominated, freezing rain fell on Gorski Kotar, glazing the entire region. It wrecked roofs, power lines and forests, causing power loss for about 14,000 households in Gorski Kotar, or about 80% of its population. Because of power lines falling on the A6, the highway was closed in of Rijeka between Bosiljevo and Kikovica, and between Kikovica and Delnice in the direction of Zagreb. It took about 10 days to restore essential infrastructure to the region, and within months electricity was back in most of its former range, but at a cost of about 84.4 million HRK to HEP. At the time it was the largest peacetime damage since its Secession from Yugoslavia, even without counting the forestry losses. The Šumarija Ravna Gora fared well relative to western forestry branches, losing mainly diseased and very poorly anchored trees. Clearing blocked forestry roads and forest paths would take years, and thanks to the declining population some were never cleared.

On 28 October 2018, strong convective precipitation led to flash flooding, causing all roads in and out to be closed.

One night in mid-June 2019, the restaurant Breza caught on fire. Three firefighters from the local volunteer fire department arrived on scene at 3:49, followed by six more, but efforts were focused on preventing its spread to adjacent inhabited rooms and all 12 bottles of air were used up, leading to cessation of firefighting until the JVP Delnice could arrive, joined by the volunteer fire departments of Stara Sušica and Kupjak. The fire was under control by 6:15 and had been put out by 10:00. 30 firefighters participated with 5 vehicles. The fire caused about a million HRK in damage.

On 16 September 2022, heavy rain led to the A6 interchange at Ravna Gora being closed due to flooding.

== Demographics ==
In the 2021 census, the total municipality population was 2028:

Municipality of Ravna Gora: Population trends 1857–2021
v

population	3657	3699	3190	3135	3334	3258	3168	3439	3412	3652	3634	3507	3300	3167	2724	2430	2028
	1857	1869	1880	1890	1900	1910	1921	1931	1948	1953	1961	1971	1981	1991	2001	2011	2021

Note:Formed from the old Delnice municipality. From 1857 to 1880 it includes part of Skrad municipality. Sources: Croatian Bureau of Statistics publications

In 1870, Ravnagora općina, in Delnice podžupanija, had 423 houses, with a population of 3193. Its 4 villages were divided into 3 porezne obćine for taxation purposes. Ravnagora had its own parish.

Religion in Vrbovsko Municipality (1890 census)
Religion	Percentage
Catholics	99.1%
Jews	0.8%
Eastern Orthodox	0.07%

In 1890, the općina of Ravna Gora (court at Ravna Gora), with an area of 71 kilometres (44 mi), belonged to the kotar and electoral district of Vrbovsko (Vrbovsko court) in the županija of Modruš-Rieka (Ogulin court and financial board). There were 454 houses (518 in 1910), with a population of 2622: 1038 male and 1584 female; 2684 in 1913. The majority were Croatian or Serbian speakers, but 14 spoke German, 10 Slovak, 7 Slovene, 2 Czech, 1 Hungarian, 1 German and 2 spoke other languages. The majority were Catholic, but 21 were Jewish and 2 were Eastern Orthodox. Its 3 villages and 3 hamlets were divided for taxation purposes into 3 porezne općine (Ravna Gora, Stari Laz, Sušica), under the Delnice office. It had 1 market (the only other in the kotar being in Vrbovsko).

In 1910, the entire općina had no resident soldiers. Militarily, Ravna Gora fell under the 26th Landwehr Infantry Regiment and 26th Landsturm Infantry Brigade, both at Karlovac.

Village of Ravna Gora: Population trends 1857–2021
v

population	1900	1879	1585	1508	1682	1610	1625	1882	1863	2087	2200	2199	2194	2135	1869	1709	1477
	1857	1869	1880	1890	1900	1910	1921	1931	1948	1953	1961	1971	1981	1991	2001	2011	2021

Note:In 2001, Šijska Kosa and part of Stara Sušica was added. Sources: Croatian Bureau of Statistics publications

In 1890, Ravna Gora itself had 227 houses and 1282 people. Vrh had 27 houses and 115 people. They attended the school in and were administered and taxed by Ravna Gora, which also had a post office.

=== Further reading ===
- Kraljevski zemaljski statistički ured (May 1913). "Repertorij prebivališta po županijama, upravnim kotarima, gradovima, upravnim i poreznim općinama". Političko i sudbeno razdjeljenje i Repertorij prebivališta Kraljevina Hrvatske i Slavonije po stanju od 1. siječnja 1913. Zagreb: Kraljevska hrvatsko-slavonsko-dalmatinska zemaljska vlada, 🖶 Kraljevska zemaljska tiskara. pp. 1–126. Page 32.

=== Settlements ===
The following settlements are under Ravna Gora:

- Kupjak, population 176 ▼
- Leskova Draga, population 8 ▼
- Ravna Gora, population 1477 ▼
- Stara Sušica, population 205 ▼
- Stari Laz, population 147 ▼
- Šije, population 15 ▼

In the same census, the population was over 97% Croats.

== Religion ==
Its Catholic parish was founded in 1807, and its parish church was built in 1906. In 1939, its parish had 2910 souls, plus 200 outside the country; at the time it was the seat of a deaconate that included the parishes Brod Moravice, Divjake, Lukovdol, Plemenitaš, Vrbovsko, Podstena and Ravna Gora. By 1974, its parish had 2550 souls, plus 50 outside the country.

List of parish priests of Ravna Gora:

- Franjo Prpić (b. Krivi Put 1889-12-08, primiz Senj 1915-06-30)
- ...
- Bogdan Zović (b. Zovići by Trviž 1932-09-27, primiz Pazin 1959-07-05)

== Governance ==
=== National ===
Representatives of the Ravna Gora kotar at the Croatian Parliament:

- Tomislav Cuculić (1848, 1861) (Note: Together with Mrkopalj and Ravna Gora, but in 1861 it was soon decided to separate the three so by-elections were held and Cuculić remained representative only Mrkopalj.)
- Ante Cuculić (1861–1865)

At the 1920 Kingdom of Serbs, Croats and Slovenes Constitutional Assembly election in Modruš-Rijeka County, Ravna Gora voted mainly for the Croatian People's Peasant Party and to a lesser extent the Communist Party.

Results at the poll in Ravna Gora
Year	Voters	Electors	NRS	DSD	KPJ	HPSS	Independent	SS	HSP	HZ
1920	705	513 (Note: One voting ball was missing when they were counted.)	3	15	144	298	38	2	1	11

=== Judiciary ===
In 1875, the kotar court of Delnice encompassed a population of 28,347, being responsible for the općine: Delnice, Lokve, Fužine, Mrkopalj, Ravna Gora, Brod, Skrad, Vrbovsko.

== Culture ==
=== Cuisine ===
In 2008, Blažica Sveticki, at the time director of the Ravna Gora branch of the National Tourist Board, founded the society Plodovi gorja Gorskog kotara (Note: Official website) for the sake of preserving local agricultural and culinary traditions and food products. The society consists of various OPG family farms, which participate in various manifestations, the oldest of which originated before the society was founded, back in 1998: the "Blueberry days" (Croatian: Dani borovnica) and "Mushroom days" (Croatian: Dani gljiva). From year to year, other fruits were added: elder, strawberry, spruce, raspberry and so on.

== Infrastructure ==
=== Forestry ===
The forestry office for Vrbovsko srez was in Ravna Gora.

== Sports ==
=== Bowling ===
Ravna Gora is home to the bowling clubs Goranka and Ravnogorac, who meet at the SPC Goranka. The best bowlers of Goranka have competed in the First Croatian Bowling League, winning its South competition; having won the West competition of the 2nd League in 2018, and before that the Karlovac-Gorski Kotar competition of the 3rd League in 2014. The local individual record at the bowling alley is 698, set in 2025 by Robert Skok.

=== Cycling ===
Beginning in 2013, the 7 stage 260 kilometres (160 mi) long Cycling Trail of Gorski Kotar (Croatian: Goranska biciklistička transverzala) passes through Hlevci.

The "Gorski Kotar Bike Tour", held annually since 2012, sometimes goes through Ravna Gora, such as in the third leg for 2023 and the second leg for 2024, both of which started and ended in Ravna Gora.

== Notable people ==
Notable people who were born or lived in Ravna Gora include:

- Zvonimir Hodak (b. 17 January 1938), lawyer and columnist

== Gallery ==
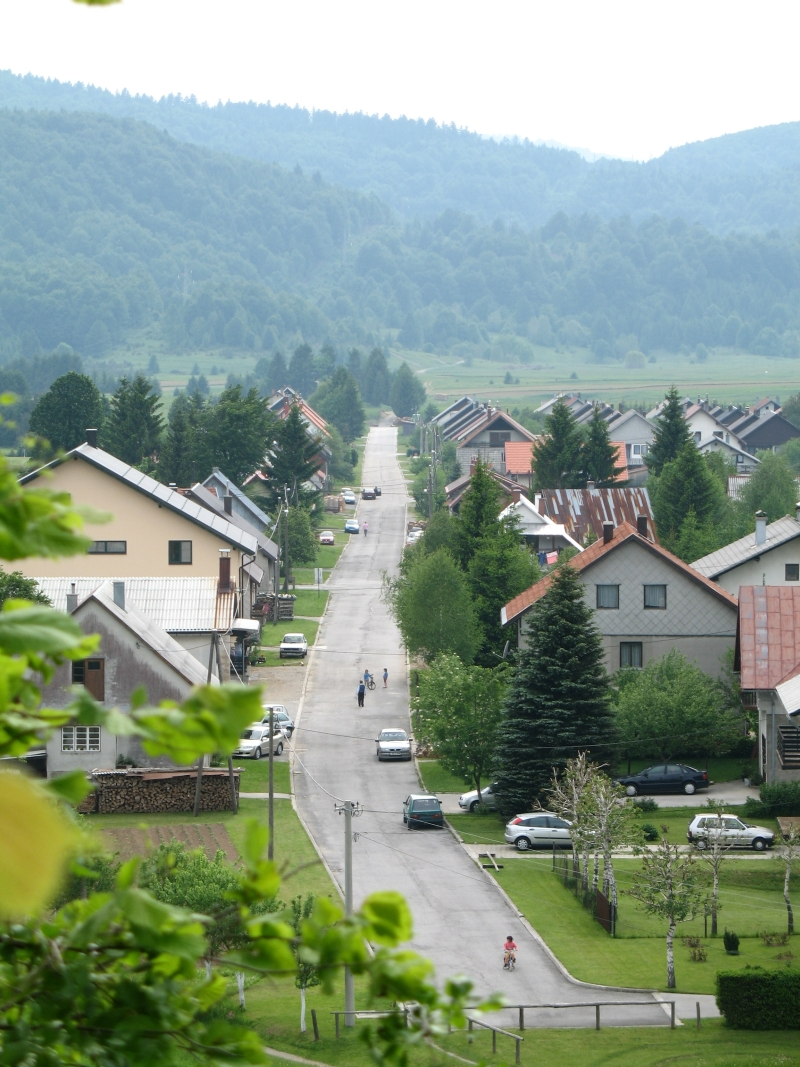
Street in Ravna Gora

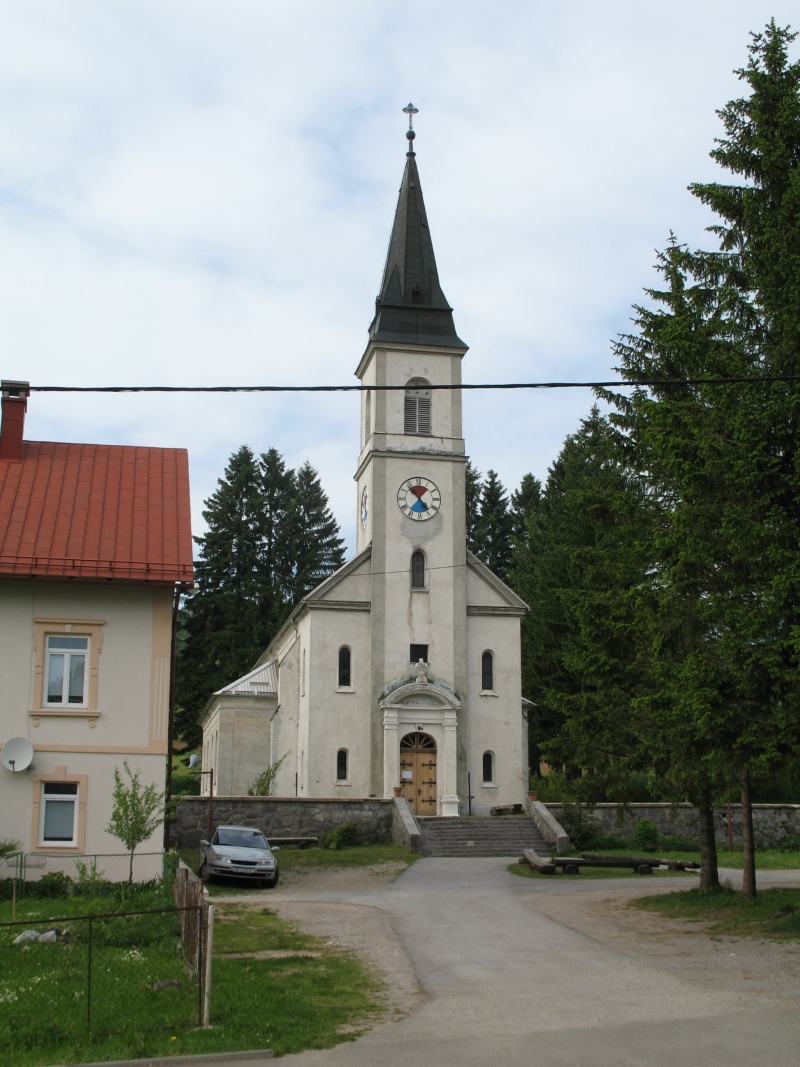
Church of Saint Teresa of Ávila

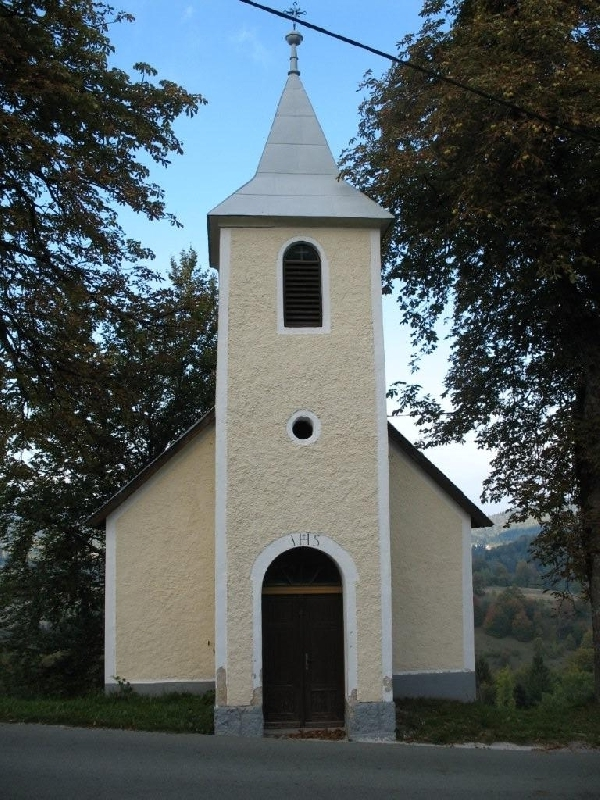
Sv. Florijana chapel in Šijska Kosa

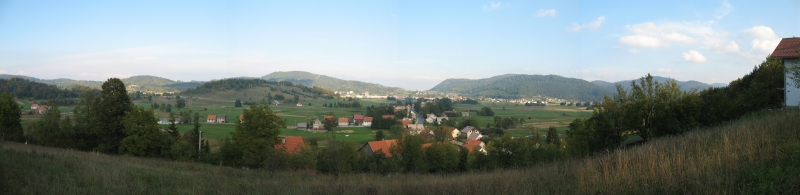
Panorama

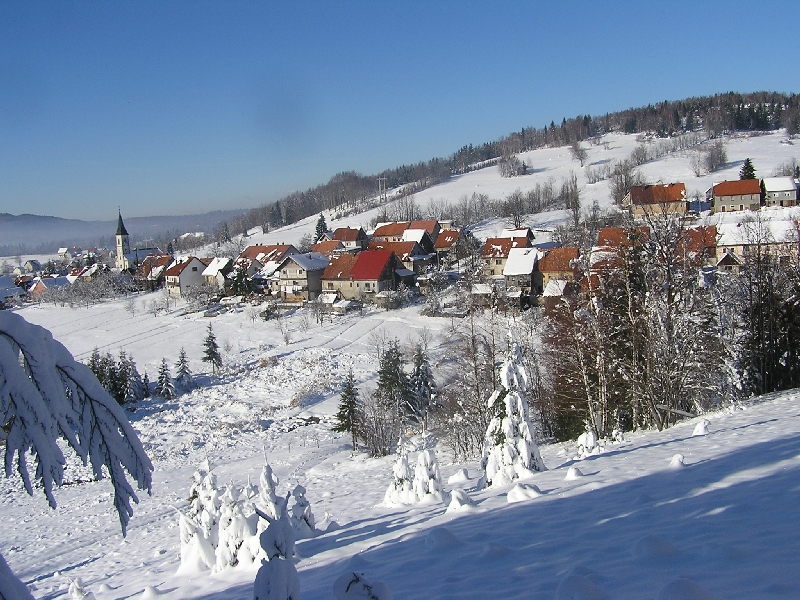
Ravna Gora in winter

== Selected works ==
- Sveticki, Blažica (2018). Kuharica iz bakine škrinjice: običaji tijekom godine [Cookbook from Grandmother's Chest: Traditions Throughout the Year] (in Croatian). Ravna Gora: Udruga Plodovi gorja Gorskog kotara. ISBN 978-953-58233-1-5.

== Bibliography ==
- Draganović, Krunoslav (1939-04-20). Opći šematizam Katoličke crkve u Jugoslaviji. Sarajevo: Akademija "Regina Apostolorum".
- Draganović, Krunoslav; Bezić, Srećko [in Croatian]; Crnković, Josip; Lešnik, Rafael; Mršo, Ivan [in Croatian]; Reven, Zdravko [in Slovenian]; Weber, Hinko (1975-05-05). Opći šematizam Katoličke Crkve u Jugoslaviji 1974 [General Directory of the Catholic Church in Yugoslavia 1974] (in Serbo-Croatian). Zagreb: Hrvatsko književno društvo sv. Ćirila i Metoda.
