= Stara Sušica, Croatia =

Stara Sušica
- Village
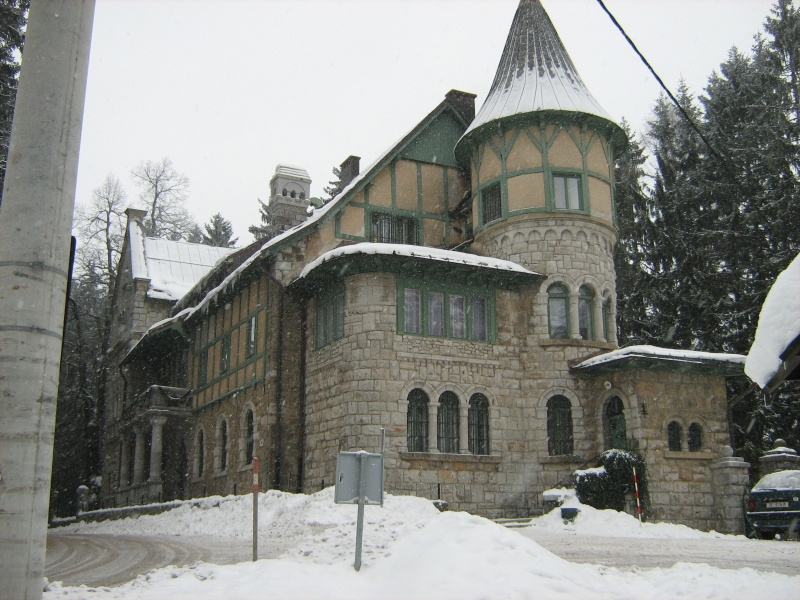
- Castle in Stara Sušica
- Interactive map of Stara Sušica
- Coordinates: 45°22′40″N 14°59′18″E
- Country: Croatia
- County: Primorje-Gorski Kotar County
- Municipality: Ravna Gora

Area
  - Total: 9.6 km^{2} (3.7 sq mi)
- Elevation: 730–769 m (2,395–2,523 ft)

Population (2021)
  - Total: 205
  - Density: 21/km^{2} (55/sq mi)
- Time zone: UTC+1 (CET)
  - Summer (DST): UTC+2 (CEST)

Stara Sušica (pronounced [staːra sǔʃit͡sa]) is a village in Croatia. It is known for its 19th century castle.

== Name ==
Historically, the town was also known as Brod Sušica. (Note: Recorded as Ponte Szusicza and Ponte Shushitza) Later as just Sušica (singular) or Sušice (plural). Other uses of the plural form of this toponym include the springs of the Pećinski Potok near Delnice, a slope near Radatovići, a field near Selsko Brdo, a group of pools on Pag and others. As in the case of Stara Sušica, the name is typically derived from a stream that dries up in the summer, termed a sùšica, from the Serbo-Croatian verb sušiti "to dry".

== Climate ==
Between 1960 and 1986, the highest temperature recorded at the local weather station was 33.0 °C (91.4 °F), on 27 July 1983. The coldest temperature was −28.5 °C (−19.3 °F), on 13 February 1985.

A weather station exists above it at an elevation of 891 metres (2,923 ft). The minimum recorded temperature for the winter of 2024–2025 was −18.0 °C (−0.4 °F), on February 20th.

== History ==
The volunteer fire department DVD Stara Sušica was founded on 12 June 1978, and is today part of the VZ općine Ravna Gora. Its past commanders:

1. Zoran Škorić (2013–)
2. Bojan Renka

The mushroom festival Dani gljiva has been held annually in Stara Sušica since 1998.

== Demographics ==
In 1890, Sušica itself had 64 houses and 383 people. Vrh-Sušica had 7 houses and 49 people. Both belonged to Ravna Gora parish. They attended the school in and were taxed by Sušica and were administered and taxed by Ravna Gora.

Village of Stara Sušica: Population trends 1857–2021
v

population	487	520	467	432	493	458	488	434	445	434	418	375	345	351	292	262	205
	1857	1869	1880	1890	1900	1910	1921	1931	1948	1953	1961	1971	1981	1991	2001	2011	2021

Note:Do 1900. iskazivano pod imenom Sušica. U 2001. smanjeno za dio područja naselja koji je pripojen naselju Ravna Gora. Sources: Croatian Bureau of Statistics publications

=== Further reading ===
- Kraljevski zemaljski statistički ured (May 1913). "Repertorij prebivališta po županijama, upravnim kotarima, gradovima, upravnim i poreznim općinama". Političko i sudbeno razdjeljenje i Repertorij prebivališta Kraljevina Hrvatske i Slavonije po stanju od 1. siječnja 1913. Zagreb: Kraljevska hrvatsko-slavonsko-dalmatinska zemaljska vlada, 🖶 Kraljevska zemaljska tiskara. pp. 1–126. Page 32.

== Governance ==
It is the seat of its own local committee.

== Attractions ==
The castle in Stara Sušica dates to Frankopan times, today owned by the City of Rijeka, serving as a retreat for children and youth.

== Infrastructure ==
There is a water storage unit in Stara Sušica with a capacity of 60 cubic metres (2,100 ft^{3}) at an elevation of 782.4 metres (2,567 ft).

== Popular culture ==
In 2020, the castle in Severin was used along with that in Severin na Kupi and the Gomirje Monastery as a filming location for the music video of the županija anthem.

The castle was used as a filming location together with the Severin castle by Marko Kutlić for his 2021 national hit Budi moja noć.

== Gallery ==
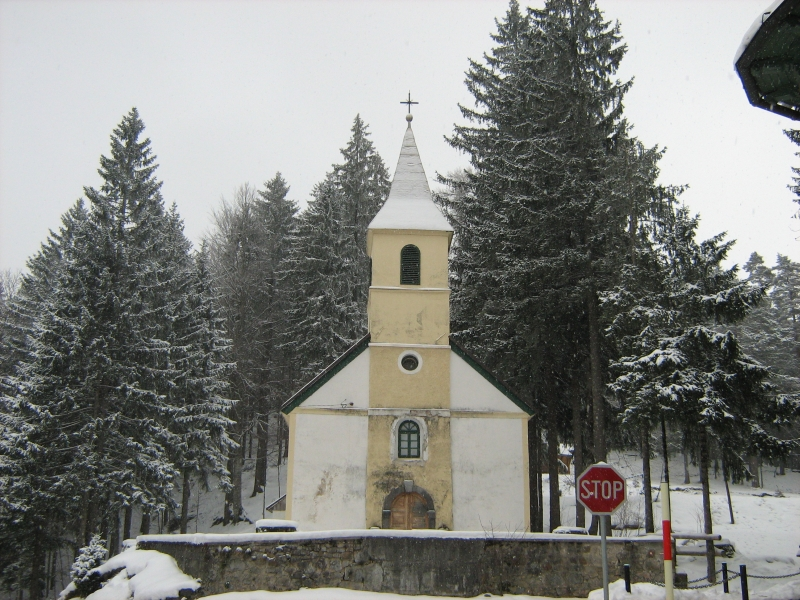
Sv. Antuna Padovanskog chapel

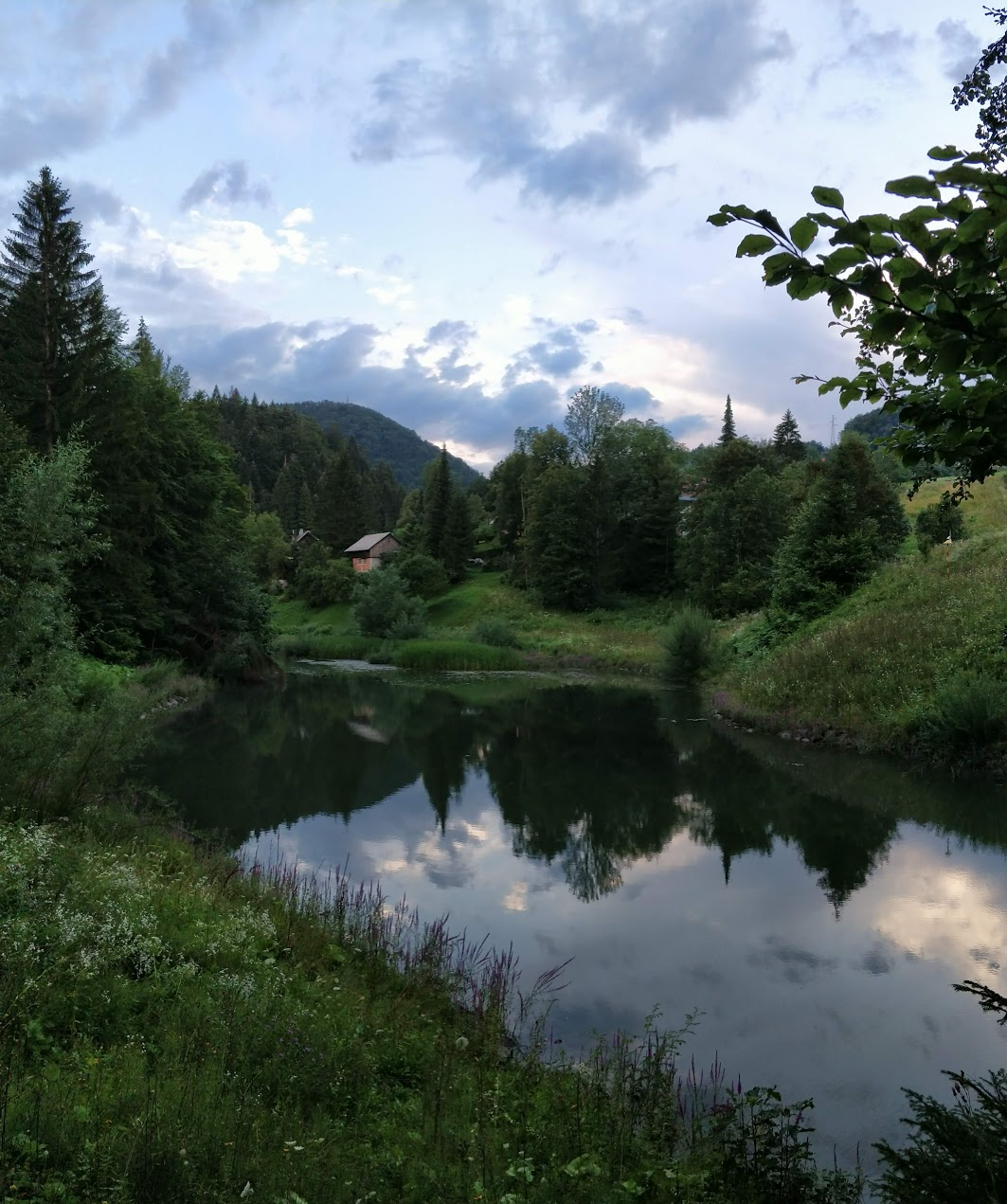
Fish pond in Stara Sušica

== Bibliography ==
- Provinz Kroatien - First Military Survey (Map). KKH. 1784.
- Coastal Zone - Second Military Survey (Map). KKH. 1824.
- Klempay, Josip Šimun (1859-06-24) [written 1859-06-16]. "Oglas". Carsko kraljevske službene narodne novine (in Serbo-Croatian). Vol. 25, no. 142. p. 380. ISSN 1333-5243.
- Klempay, Josip Šimun (1859-06-25) [written 1859-06-16]. "Oglas". Carsko kraljevske službene narodne novine (in Serbo-Croatian). Vol. 25, no. 143. p. 384. ISSN 1333-5243.
- Klempay, Josip Šimun (1859-06-28) [written 1859-06-16]. "Oglas". Carsko kraljevske službene narodne novine (in Serbo-Croatian). Vol. 25, no. 146. p. 390. ISSN 1333-5243.
- KZSU (1877). "Pregled gradovah i podžupanijah i uredjenja upravnih obćinah uz naznačenje poreznih obćinah, njihove površine i k istim spadajućih mjestah uz broj kućah i stanovnikah". Pregled političkoga i sudbenoga razdieljenja kraljevinah Hrvatske i Slavonije i uredjenja upravnih obćinah. Na temelju naredbe kr. hrv.-slav.-dalm. zem. vlade od 5. veljače 1875. broj 221 pr. i provedenoga zatim zaokruženja upravnih obćinah. Zagreb: Kraljevska hrvatsko-slavonsko-dalmatinska zemaljska vlada, 🖶 Tiskara "Narodnih novinah". pp. 1–120.
- Jakupec, M.; Palitschek, Rud. (1887). Generalkarte von Mitteleuropa 1:200.000 der Franzisco-Josephinischen Landesaufnahme, Österreich-Ungarn (Map). § Senj: 33-45.
- KZSU (1895). "Repertorij prebivališta po županijah, kotarih, upravnih i poreznih obćinah". Političko i sudbeno razdieljenje kralj. Hrvatske i Slavonije i Repertorij prebivališta po stanju od 31. svibnja 1895. Zagreb: Kraljevska hrvatsko-slavonsko-dalmatinska zemaljska vlada. pp. 1–206.
- Korenčić, Mirko (1979). Naselja i stanovništvo Socijalističke Republike Hrvatske (1857–1971) [Villages and Population of the Socialist Republic of Croatia (1857–1971)]. Djela Jugoslavenske akademije znanosti i umjetnosti (in Serbo-Croatian). Vol. 54.
- Žgela, Ivona (2023-09-11) [defended 2023-09-20]. Izazovi ruralnog turizma Gorskog kotara [Challenges of rural tourism in Gorski kotar] (Thesis) (in Serbo-Croatian). Rijeka: Sveučilište u Rijeci.
- "Sùšica". Hrvatski jezični portal (in Serbo-Croatian). Srce. n.d.
