= Sušice (Uherské Hradiště District) =

- Municipality
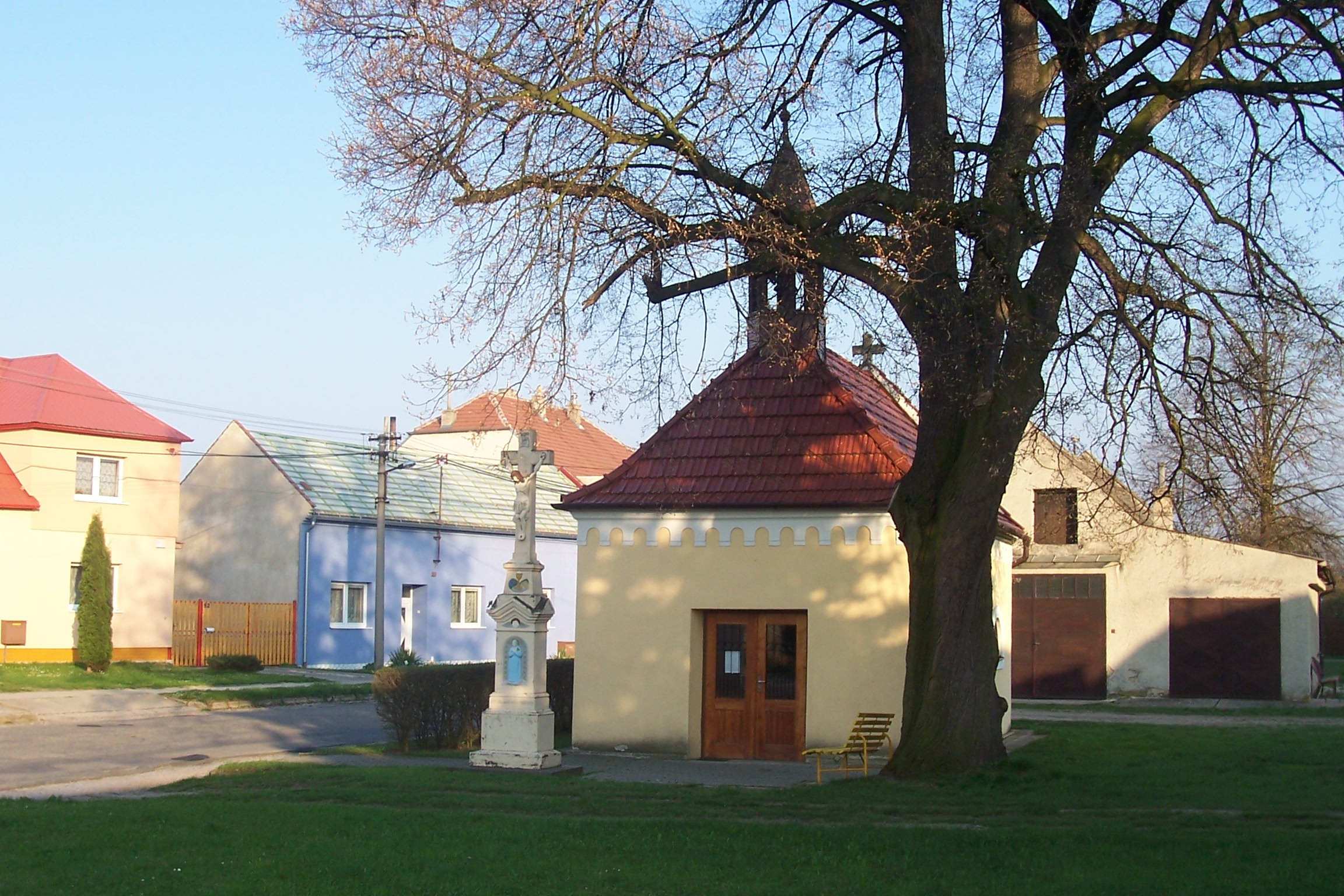
- Chapel of the Visitation of Our Lady

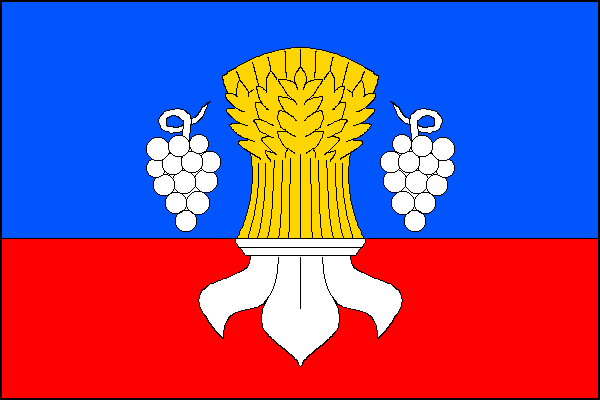
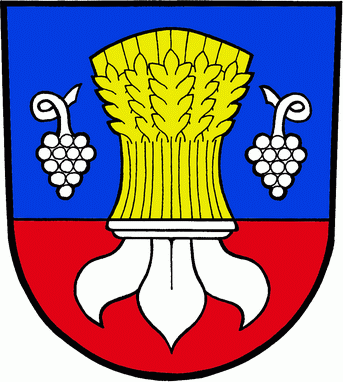
- Flag Coat of arms

- Location in the Czech Republic
- Coordinates: 49°7′20″N 17°27′8″E
- Country: Czech Republic
- Region: Zlín
- District: Uherské Hradiště
- First mentioned: 1344

Area
  - Total: 1.89 km^{2} (0.73 sq mi)
- Elevation: 202 m (663 ft)

Population (2026-01-01)
  - Total: 656
  - Density: 347/km^{2} (899/sq mi)
- Time zone: UTC+1 (CET)
  - Summer (DST): UTC+2 (CEST)
- Postal code: 687 04
- Website: www.obecsusice.com

Sušice is a municipality and village in Uherské Hradiště District in the Zlín Region of the Czech Republic. It has about 700 inhabitants.

Sušice lies approximately 7 kilometres (4 mi) north of Uherské Hradiště, 21 km (13 mi) south-west of Zlín, and 244 km (152 mi) south-east of Prague.

== Demographics ==
Historical population
Year	Pop.	±%
1869	206	—
1880	240	+16.5%
1890	268	+11.7%
1900	297	+10.8%
1910	295	−0.7%
1921	317	+7.5%
1930	429	+35.3%
1950	493	+14.9%
1961	491	−0.4%
1970	550	+12.0%
1980	527	−4.2%
1991	513	−2.7%
2001	502	−2.1%
2011	575	+14.5%
2021	641	+11.5%
Source: Censuses
