= Leskova Draga =

- Village
- Location within Croatia
- Coordinates: 45.386787°N 14.894922°E
- Country: Croatia
- County: Primorje-Gorski Kotar County
- City: Ravna Gora

Area
  - Total: 1.5 km^{2} (0.58 sq mi)

Population (2021)
  - Total: 8
  - Density: 5.3/km^{2} (14/sq mi)
- Time zone: UTC+1 (CET)
  - Summer (DST): UTC+2 (CEST)

Leskova Draga is a village in Croatia, under the Ravna Gora township, in Primorje-Gorski Kotar County.

== Geography ==
The village is situated at the foot of Mikulov vrh. The southeast slopes of Mikulov vrh are referred to as Ponikve.

== History ==
From 31 January to 2 February 2014, while S and SW geostrophic wind dominated, freezing rain fell on Gorski Kotar, glazing the entire region. It wrecked roofs, power lines an forests, causing power loss for about 14,000 households in Gorski Kotar, or about 80% of its population. Because of power lines falling on the A6, the highway was closed in of Rijeka between Bosiljevo and Kikovica, and between Kikovica and Delnice in the direction of Zagreb. It took about 10 days to restore essential infrastructure to the region, and within months electricity was back in most of its former range, but at a cost of about 84.4 million HRK to HEP. At the time it was the largest peacetime damage since its Secession from Yugoslavia, even without counting the forestry losses. Clearing blocked forestry roads and forest paths would take years, and thanks to the declining population some were never cleared.

== Demographics ==
Village of Leskova Draga: Population trends 1857–2021
v

population				25	50	63	55	51	41	60	60	58	42	31	14	10	8
	1857	1869	1880	1890	1900	1910	1921	1931	1948	1953	1961	1971	1981	1991	2001	2011	2021

Note:Od 1857. do 1880. podaci su sadržani u naselju Kupjak. Sources: Croatian Bureau of Statistics publications

== Sports ==
The "Gorski Kotar Bike Tour", held annually since 2012, sometimes goes through Leskova Draga, such as in the third leg for 2023 and the second leg for 2024.
