= List of castles in Croatia =

This list of castles in Croatia includes castles, remains (ruins) of castles and other fortifications like fortresses which used to be castles at some point in history. A castle (from Latin castellum) is a type of fortified structure built in Europe (thus also in Croatia) and the Middle East during the Middle Ages. In its simplest terms, the definition of a castle accepted amongst academics is "a private fortified residence".

Construction and development of manors and castles on the territory of Croatia can be followed with certainty in the last two millennium – from Roman villa rusticas and palaces (like Diocletian's Palace), to medieval castles (burgs), Renaissance villas-summer houses in Dubrovnik and Dalmatia, to Baroque and historicist manors of Northern Croatia, and town villas and palaces in most bigger Croatian towns. The biggest fortress in Croatia is located in Knin.

Castle	Location	Type	Constructed	Notes	Image
Adamović-Mihaljević Castle	Čepin, Osijek-Baranja County	Castle	19th century	The castle, surrounded by a park, was built by the Adamović Čepinski and Mihaljević families in the first half of the 19th century. It was conceived as a one-story classicist building with a key-shaped ground plan with a recent addition on the courtyard side. Although, due to adaptations from the second half of the 20th century on the facade of the wing facing the courtyard and the courtyard facade of the central part of the building, it lost much of its originality, the castle still belongs to the circle of rare classicist castles in the wider region of Osijek-Baranja County.	
Adamovich-Cseh Castle	Erdut, Osijek-Baranja County	Manor	18th century	The Adamović - Cseh family built a large manor house on their significant estate in Erdut, which was also adorned with beautifully landscaped vineyards (it is speculated that it was built either at the end of the 18th or in the first half of the 19th century). Irena pl. Cséh lived in the manor house until 1973. It served as the center of the estate, so in addition to the residential part, it also had the necessary outbuildings and large cellars that are still in use today. The manor house has a very indented ground plan, built in the spirit of historicism of its time. In fact, it is a single-storey building, which has a one-storey wing and a polygonal tower with a turret. The high porch that forms the main entrance is decorated with valuable wood carvings.	
Badnjevice Fortress	Badnjevice, between Ričice and Proložac	Stone Fortress	First half of 15th century	Badnjevice Fortress is one of the most impressive medieval fortresses in Croatia. It is located on the western side of the Badnjevice canyon, and was built in the first half of the 15th century. It was in use until the end of the 17th and beginning of the 18th century, when Ottoman rule in that area ended.	
Bajnski Dvori Castle	Gornje Ladanje, Varaždin County	Manor	17th century	Founded by the members of Both of Bayna, a noble family of Hungarian ancestry. Enlarged and renewed in the 19th century in the spirit of historicism.	
Banfi Manor	Štrigova, Međimurje County	Manor	1373	Founded by the members of Bánffy, a noble family of Hungarian ancestry. Renewed recently .	
Batthyany-Strattmann Castle	Ludbreg, Varaždin County	Castle	ca. 1320	Visit Batthyany Castle located in Ludbreg Old Town. It is a square castle with two outbuildings. Traces of the defensive ring of the water supply from the river Bednja can be seen around the castle. The castle consists of a ground floor and three floors, the first of which is much higher. The earliest data on the existence of the fort date from 1320.	
Belaj	Cerovlje, Istria County	Castle	14th–17th centuries	Well preserved and renovated	
Bežanec Castle	Valentinovo, Krapina, Krapina-Zagorje County	Castle	18th century	This baroque castle dating from 18th century was renovated during the 1930s in the classic manner and because of that, it has become one of the most representative castles in Croatia. The castle is a monument of world cultural heritage.	
Savoy Castle	Bilje, Croatia, Osijek-Baranja County	Castle	1720	The hunting lodge in Bilje was built in the 18th century by the Austrian military leader Prince Eugene of Savoy. There is also speculation about the name of the architect of this building, and the Austrian architect Johann Lukas von Hildebrandt, known as the builder of the Belvedere Palace in Vienna, is mentioned.	
Bribir Castle	Bribir, Primorje-Gorski Kotar County	Fortress		The fortress is located on the cliff of the old medieval town of Bribir in Croatia, as part of a former medieval castle with a tower that dominates the Vinodol valley and which offers a beautiful view of the Adriatic Sea in the distance.	
Brigido Castle	Lupoglav, Istria County	Castle	1634	The castle was built in 1634 for Eberstein family which was already a country castle of the noble Brigido family, which they built after they bought the Lupoglav estate in 1634 and decided to abandon the old castle located on the hill.	
Blagaj Castle	Blagaj, Karlovac County	Fortress	1339	Dubovac was first mentioned in 1339, when it received its first parish priest. Often written in Glagolitic script, testimonies about the commercial and artisanal, legal and educational circumstances of the lives of Dubovac's purgers-freedmen are most numerous in the few decades preceding the ill-fated Good Friday of 1578, when the Ottomans razed the town to the ground.	
Brod Fortress	Slavonski Brod, Brod-Posavina County; 45°9′23″N 18°0′24″E	Fortress	1715–1780	In Brod, one of the important strategic and traffic sites controlled by the border crossing towards Turkey and connected the main trade routes, Austria in the time of 1715–1780. He builds a large imperial and royal Slavonian border fortress Brod on the Savi River, which, together with the established Slavonian Baroque cities of Osijek and Stari Gradiška, belongs to the large defense system on the border towards the Turkish Empire, which in the first half of the 18th century was designed by Prince Eugene of Savoy.	
Bubnjarci Castle	Bubnjarci, Karlovac County	Castle	15th century	Founded unknown, but later a noble family of Croatian ancestry.	
Califfi Castle	Ugljan, Ugljan, Zadar County	Castle	17th century	Califfi Castle is a 17th-century castle on the Croatian island of Ugljan (Dalmatia), in the town of the same name. The castle was built by the Califfi family in the 17th century. The Bercich (in Croatian Berčić or Brčić) family from Zara (Zadar) acted as stewards of the castle, and the castle eventually took on their name. More recently the castle has been restored and carries the name Dvor Krešimir Ćosić after the former Croatian basketball star.	
Cambi Castle	Kaštel Kambelovac, Split-Dalmatia County	Castle/Fortress	16th century	Kaštel Kambelovac was built by the aristocratic family Cambi from Split (1589). In 1517 noblemen and landowners from Split, brothers Jerolim and Nikola Cambi, built a castle on an islet to protect themselves and residents of Lažan and Kruševik settlements.	
Cetin Castle	Podcetin, Karlovac County; 45°08′18″N 15°43′54″E	Castle	14th century	At the top of the hill dominates the old town of Cetin, the same one where a council of some of the Croatian nobles was held 497 years ago. They gathered on New Year's Day 1527 and there elected Ferdinand I of Habsburg as the Croatian king and his wife Anna as queen. Later, Cetin fell into the hands of the Turks, and returned to the Krajina administration, which abandoned it in the mid-19th century. That is when the fortress began to decline.	
Cippico Castle	Kaštel Novi, Split-Dalmatia County	Castle/Fortress	1512	Built as a fortified summer residence by Pavao Antun Cippico, a nobleman from Trogir.	
Diocletian's Palace	Split, Split-Dalmatia County	Palace	3rd century AD	Diocletian's Palace was built in 3rd century AD as a residence for the Roman emperor Diocletian in his hometown of Split. One of the best preserved Roman Architecture in Europe, The Palace is under UNESCO World Heritage Site since 1979.	
Čačvina Castle	Čačvina, Split-Dalmatia County	Fortress	1371	The Čačvina fortress, built on a hill northeast of Trilj, had an important function in the past of monitoring the area and traffic that took place in the interior of Dalmatia. In principle, the fortress consists of two towers, was first mentioned in 1371, and was once ruled by the Ottomans and Venetians	
Čakovec Castle	Čakovec, Međimurje County; 46°23′20″N 16°25′55″E	Castle	13th century	Built by Count Dimitrius Csáky, after whom the city of Čakovec is named. Later owned by many other noble families, including Lacković, the Counts of Celje, Ernušt, Zrinski, Althan and Feštetić. Outside the biggest fortification in Međimurje County, inside the main palace.	
Drežnik Castle	Drežnik Grad, Karlovac County; 44°57′N 15°40′E	Castle/Fortress	12th century		
Drivenik Castle	Novi Vinodolski, Primorje-Gorski Kotar County; 45°14′17″N 14°38′48″E	Castle/Fortress	15th century	In the first phase of construction, the Frankopans built the southern part of the Drivenik fortress with a round guard tower and high walls that enclosed a square courtyard. In the second phase, a new outer wall was built, reinforced with round towers at the corners and at the entrance on the western side. Below the fortress is the church of St. Stephen from the 15th century, and the parish church of St. Dujem is Baroque, renovated in 1821. The Drivenik castle used to be entered by a drawbridge over a dug ditch.	
Dubovac Castle	Karlovac, Karlovac County	Castle	13th century	The Dubovac Castle is one of the best-preserved and most beautiful monuments of medieval architecture in Croatia. It was built on a prehistoric hill above the Kupa, and was named after the dubs, the oaks growing on the surrounding slopes. It changed hands many times throughout history, changing its appearance according to the needs and fashion of the period. Its current appearance is the result of a comprehensive restoration program carried out during the mid-twentieth century.	
Dvigrad	Draga near Pazin, Istria County	Castle/Fortress	18th century	Dvigrad is an abandoned medieval town in central Istria, Croatia. It is located in the Draga valley. The history of the settlement is prehistoric; it remained inhabited until the 18th century.	
Đurđevac Castle	Đurđevac, Koprivnica-Križevci County; 46°02′43″N 17°04′07″E	Castle	16th century	The Old Town in Đurđevac is a cultural monument of the Republic of Croatia and one of the best-preserved Gothic-Renaissance fortresses in the continental part of Croatia. Once surrounded by an endless swamp, it belongs to the Wasseburg type of fortress, which has a unique polygonal ground plan. Over the centuries, the fortress changed owners, and its most significant historical role was from the second half of the 16th century, during the Ottoman invasion, and Đurđevac, as a direct border fortress, stood directly on the defense of the "remnant of the remnants" of the Croatian Kingdom until 1699.	
Eltz Manor	Vukovar, Vukovar-Syrmia County; 45°21′27″N 18°59′42″E	Manor	1749–1751	Eltz Manor is a Baroque castle in Vukovar, Croatia. The 18th century manor is the location of the Vukovar City Museum. In 1736 Philipp Karl von Eltz, the Archchancellor of the Holy Roman Empire and Prince-Archbishop of Mainz, had purchased Vukovar manor in the eastern Kingdom of Slavonia (Syrmia), then part of the Habsburg Monarchy ruled by Emperor Charles VI.. The castle was originally built between the period of 1749 to 1751 by the Archchancellor's descendants of the German Catholic noble House of Eltz and was gradually extended over time. Eltz Manor, however, suffered a great deal of damage during the Croatian War of Independence, when it was bombarded by the Yugoslavian Army during the Battle of Vukovar. After four years of restorations co financed by Croatian Government and Council of Europe Development Bank, it was completely restored to its pre-war appearance in October 2011.	
Erdödy Castle	Jastrebarsko, Zagreb County	Castle	15th century	Erdödy Castle is the oldest preserved cultural monument in Jastrebarsko. It was built by Ban Matija Gereb between 1483 and 1489. From the beginning of the 16th century until 1922, the castle was owned by the noble Erdödy family. Many times expanded over its long history, this quadrangular castle, reinforced with two impressive, rounded towers, was an important fortress during the Turkish conquests. The inner courtyard, with its exceptional acoustics, is adorned with a portico with arcades and Baroque columns. The plaque to the left of the entrance was installed in 1592 by the Croatian Ban Toma Erdödy, winner of the Battle of Sisak (1593), son of the first owner of the castle, Ban Petar Erdödy.	
Erdödy castle, Kerestinec	Kerestinec, Sveta Nedjelja, Zagreb County	Castle	16th century	Kerestinec Castle is a castle constructed by the Erdödy family in Kerestinec, Croatia, near the town of Sveta Nedelja. It is a 1st category monument. It is a two-story structure with a square layout and cylindrical corner towers and open arcades in the courtyard. This is a Renaissance castle with fortified elements.	
Erdut Castle	Erdut, Osijek-Baranja County; 45°31′36″N 19°03′51″E	Castle	14th century	Erdut is known for its medieval fortress, whose remains rise above the meanders of the Danube. Little is preserved of this old and grand fort. The most preserved part of the fort is a round tower with three floors and protruding upper sections on consoles (Italian Renaissance style). In 1891 the tower was not professionally restored and turned into a tomb. In the protected area of the landscape of Erdut, along the fort itself, an educational path was built. The educational path contains lookout points and three views.	
Feštetić Castle	Pribislavec near Čakovec, Međimurje County	Castle	1870	Built by count Juraj Feštetić in neo-gothic style. Today houses the Pribislavec elementary school.	
Fortica Fortress	Otočac, Lika-Senj County	Fortress	1619–1630	Fortica Fortress is a ruined early modern fortified structure in the town of Otočac, Lika-Senj County, Croatia. Built on the top of a flat hill at the northern end of the town, it overlooks a large part of Otočac and Gacka River valley. Once a military-defensive stronghold on the line of defense against Ottoman Turks, it turned later slowly, by the end of the Ottoman wars during the 19th century, being uncared-for, into a ruin. Recently, the fortress has been partially restored.	
Fortica Fortress (Hvar Fortress, Spanish Fortress)	Hvar, Split-Dalmatia County	Fortress	16th century	It was built at the beginning of the 16th century (during the Venetian rule) and was reconstructed in 1579. Today the fort holds a collection of amphora and other exhibits from antiquity and the Middle Ages. Besides experiencing its exquisite architecture, you will experience an unforgettable panoramic view of the city of Hvar, its surroundings and the Pakleni islands. The fort was a military and construction complex, built in a complex architectural matrix due to irregular terrain. It consisted of four towers, revelines, battlements, a loophole, a gunpowder building, one large and one smaller water tank, a crew room, a jail and a chapel.	
Fortress Kastel	Hrvatska Kostajnica, Sisak-Moslavina County	Fortress	13th century	Hrvatska Kostajnica, a long-standing and proud Croatian town whose position determined its role, is located on the banks of the Una River and is located in the Sisak-Moslavina County. The Old Zrinski Fort is a 13th-century fortress that earned the title of the Defender of Croatia during the wars with the Turks. In the second half of the 13th century, the Kostajnica princes established their center on the banks of the Una River. Most of the information about the construction of the fortress dates back to the 14th and 15th centuries.	
Frankopan Castle	Krk, Primorje-Gorski Kotar County	Castle	13th century	The Castle located on Kamplin Square was erected by the Frankopan noble family over several centuries and generations. The oldest part of the fortress is a square shaped tower leaning on the diocese building where once a courtroom stood. An inscription situated on the lunette above the entrance says that the building was erected in 1191, in the period of the Bishop Ivan and knights Bartul and Vid and with the support of the whole municipality. The round tower on the northern part of the castle was built after the square one, probably in the 13th century.	
Glavaš - Dinarić Fortress	Vrlika, Split-Dalmatia County	Fortress	15th century	Glavaš – Dinarić Fortress is a fortress located in the continental part of Dalmatia, Croatia. Dinarić is located below the Dinara mountain, northeast the town of Vrlika, near the village of Kijevo. Dinarić was built in the 15th century, when Croatia was threatened by Turkish invasions. It was chain link of nearby forts like fort Prozor and Potravnik.	
Grižane Castle	Grižane-Belgrad, Primorje-Gorski Kotar County	Castle	13th century	Grižane Castle is a ruined castle and site near Grižane in Vinodol, in the northern part of the Adriatic coast, western Croatia. The castle of Grižane had an odd, rectangular form with circular towers, and this irregularity was caused by the peculiar structure of the field. In the medieval age it was a strategic point in Vinodol valley, but it was damaged in an earthquake in 1323. Its owners were members of the Frankopan family.	
Grobnik Castle	Grobnik, Primorje-Gorski Kotar County	Castle	10th century	From 1225 belonged to the Krčki (later renamed Frankopan) family and from the 16th century to the Zrinskis.	
Gvozdansko Castle	Gvozdansko, Sisak-Moslavina County	Castle	15th century	The fortified town of Gvozdansko was first mentioned in 1488, and was built by the princes of the Zrinski family to protect the silver and lead mines. These strategic metals from the Gvozdansko mines were put to the best use for the economic rise of the Zrinski princes, but also for the long-term successful defense of their estates in Pounje. Nikola III. Zrinski began to mint silver coins from silver, and his son Nikola Šubić Zrinski continued to do so. It is not known exactly when the mint in Gvozdansko was founded, but the first written record dates back to 1525.	
Hreljin Castle	Hreljin, Primorje-Gorski Kotar County	Fortress	13th century	The local name "Gradina" could indicate the most ancient, prehistoric phase of Hreljin. Later, Hreljin was probably part of the chain of Roman fortifications Septem turres. In 1255, it became the property of the princes of Krk, or Frankopans. The first mention of Hreljin dates back to 1225, when the Croatian-Hungarian king Andrew II gifted the Vinodol Principality, which included Hreljin, to the princes of Krk, and somewhat later, in 1288, its leaders signed the Vinodol Law.	
Ilok Castle (Odescalchi Castle)	Ilok, Vukovar-Srijem County	Castle	15th century	The Odescalchi Castle stands on the foundations of the 15th-century castle of King Nikola Ilocki. It was Emperor Leopold who rewarded Pope Innocent XI Odescalchi and his family with the castle and the entire Ilok estate for their assistance in liberating the town from the Ottoman Empire. The Pope's nephews, Italian aristocrats, expanded and transformed the castle into its current Baroque-Classicist style.	
Janković Castle	Suhopolje, Virovitica-Podravina County	Castle	18th century	The story begins. In 1765, on the Suhopolje estate, there was a brick inn with a vaulted cellar, which still keeps the secrets of that period. As “Suho polje” was a small island in a wetland, after drying it became a great economic treasure for the fruit manor. Proof of this is the relocation of the administration five years later to today's Suhopolje. The Janković family is a key element in creating the cultural heritage and history of Suhopolje. The castle was recently renovated and functions as a 4-star hotel.	
Janković Castle	Daruvar, Bjelovar-Bilogora County; 45°59′28″N 17°22′36″E	Castle	18th century	The 18th-century castle of Count Antun Janković, located in the very center of the city, is a protected cultural monument of the Republic of Croatia, 1st category, and one of the most valuable Baroque buildings in the Bjelovar-Bilogora County.	
Januševec Castle	Prigorje Brdovečko, Zagreb County	Manor	19th-century (c. 1828)	Januševec Castle was built around 1828 for Baron Joseph von Werklein (Croatian: Josip Vrkljan; 1777–1849). The architect of the building is not established with certainty: while Bartol Felbinger produced several designs for Januševec that were never realized, the construction itself was directed by the Zagreb master builder Angelo Chicco. The building has a rectangular ground plan and rises through two stories. At its center stands a circular hall, or rotunda, which extends through the full height of the structure and is crowned by a dome; the rooms of both floors are grouped around this central space. One facade is articulated by a large loggia, while two others carry columned terraces.	
Kalnik Fortress	Kalnik, Koprivnica-Križevci County	Fortress	13th century	The fortress was first mentioned in 1243, when King Bela IV emphasized its importance in the fight against the Mongols (Tatars). According to legend, the king took refuge on Kalnik with his entourage while fleeing from the Tatars. The local population fed them plums, so they were called plum pickers; the Tatars gave up, and the king granted them noble titles. Under Kalnik, the Tatars suffered their first defeat. Today, the fortress is in ruins.	
Kamerlengo Castle	Trogir, Split-Dalmatia County; 43°30′55″N 16°14′51″E	Fortress	Mid-15th century	The tower itself was built between 1420 and 1437 during the Venetian conquest of Trogir, and is strategically located along the coast to serve as a defense. The fortress is made in the form of an irregular trapezoid with four towers at the ends, the oldest and largest of which was built earlier in the 14th century. The consultant for the building of the tower was Lorenzo Picino, while the stonemason Marin Radoj was in charge of the actual construction.	
Kamičak Castle	Krka National Park, Šibenik-Knin County	Castle	14th century	Kamičak Castle is a ruined medieval fortified structure on a rock at the top of the hill above the Krka River in the Krka National Park, Croatia. It is situated not far from the Brištane village in the administrative area of the Town of Drniš, Šibenik-Knin County. Located between the Visovac Lake and Roški Slap waterfall, it perks up like an eagle in unreachable eagle's nest on the edge of a cliff.	
Kaštilac	Kaštel Gomilica, Split-Dalmatia County	Castle/Fortress	15th century	Kaštilac Castle, locally known as just 'Kaštilac', lies in the town of Kaštel Gomilica, in the county of Split-Dalmatia in Croatia. After the fall of Bosnia to the Ottoman Empire in 1463, Dalmatia, being part of the Venetian Republic, faced the danger of Ottoman invasions. Local landowners; the Split Archbishopric, monasteries and nobles from Trogir and Split, therefore wished to protect their estates and the villagers working for them. So, during the following decades they started to build 17 fortifications and fortified 12 villages along the coast of the Kaštela Bay, between Trogir and Split.	
Klenovnik Castle	Klenovnik, Varaždin County; 46°16′22″N 16°4′36″E	Castle	13th century	Klenovnik is the biggest Croatian castle. It is situated in Klenovnik, Varaždin County. First mentioning of the castle dates back in the 13th century when the Hungarian-Croatian king Béla IV takes it away from Pochun and gives it to then ruler of town Varaždin. In the late 17th century, king Maksimilijan sells this castle for 20 000 forint to noble Croatian families Gašpar I Drašković. From the mid-16th century to the mid-19th century it was owned by the Counts Drašković, who built a quadrangular Renaissance two-story castle in 1616.	
Klis Fortress	Klis, Split-Dalmatia County	Fortress	5th century	Klis Fortress is one of the most complete examples of fortification architecture in Croatia. It is located in a strategically important position in the town of the same name, Klis, in Split-Dalmatia County, on a pass between Kozjak to the west and Mosor to the east. Due to its strategic position at the crossing from Split to Zagora and Bosnia, battles for supremacy over it have been fought in this area for centuries. Klis Fortress is one of the most prominent fortifications in Croatia, and was first mentioned in the 5th century, but it owes its fame most of all to the Turkish wars,	
Knin Fortress	Knin, Šibenik-Knin County	Fortress	9th century	The Knin Fortress is one of the largest and oldest European fortresses. The oldest part of the fortress, Kaštel Knin, was built in the second half of the 9th century. Over the centuries, it was conquered, destroyed and rebuilt by Hungarians, Turks, Venetians, French and Austrians. The fortress is located on the southern part of the Spas hill and is located 100 meters above the city of Knin. It is 470 meters long and 110 meters wide at its widest point. The defensive walls that surround it on all sides for a length of almost 2 kilometers are up to 20 meters high in places. It is located at 345 meters above sea level. During the period of the early Croatian state it was an occasional residence of national rulers (Trpimir, Muncimir, Svetoslav, Držislav, Zvonimir and Petar).	
Kožljak Fortress	Kršan, Istria County	Castle/Fortress	13th century	Located on the steep hill, Kožljak's very name points to its inaccessible position. Its residential part used to be reached by stairs chiselled into a live rock, surrounded by walls. The Kožljak castle was erected on the southern slopes of Učka Mountain, on the steep cliff, along the old road connecting ancient Histria and Liburnia, the last in a sequence of feudal forts from Karst to eastern Istria along the steep hills of Učka. Erected on the site of the ancient Histrian structure, it was first mentioned in the written sources of 1102 as one of the castles given by Count Ulrich II Weimar-Orlamunde as a gift to the Patriarchy of Aquileia.	
Kršan	Kršan, Istria County	Fortress	13th century	The old town of Kršan is a fortified town and one of the best-preserved Istrian castles, which was first mentioned in the 13th century. It is located on a hill surrounded by defensive walls. You enter the town through the well-preserved town gate, and a small courtyard is surrounded by the remains of residential and commercial buildings. On the right side, the old municipal house is the first to lean against the defensive wall. In front of it is a castle that is partly built on a steep stone rock, and its defence structure has a trapezoidal plan, being made up of a high tower that dominates the entire settlement.	
Lapšina Castle	Lapšina, Međimurje County	Demolished Castle	16th century	Lapšina is mentioned in charter issued in year 1478 as Lapsthin. In the late 16th century, the nobleman Nikola I Mlakovečki (Nicolaus Malakoczy) built a castle in Lapšina. The castle fell into disrepair during 19th century and by the 1930s it was completely demolished	
Ledenice Castle	Ledenice, Primorje-Gorski Kotar County	Fortress	13th century	The castle, which from 1225 came under the rule of Vid, a Krk count, was mentioned for first time in 1248, and exactly four decades later the representatives of its civil and ecclesiastical authorities participated in the adoption of the Law Codex of Vinodol.	
Lovrijenac	Dubrovnik, Dubrovnik-Neretva County	Fortress	14th century	Lovrijenac Fortress is situated on a 37-metre-high rock to the west of the Old City. The symbol of Dubrovnik's survival and freedom, the Fortress defended the city from the sea and covered the western Pile Gate. Above the entrance to the Fortress is the famed inscription: NON BENE PRO TOTO LIBERTAS VENDITUR AURO (Freedom is not to be sold for all the world's gold).	
Lužnica Manor	Zaprešić, Zagreb County	Manor	18th century	Lužnica Manor was built at the end of the 18th century, under the direct influence of Central European, especially Austrian Baroque. Lužnica Castle is included in the group of similar three-winged castles. In the construction of three-winged castles, the closure of the building towards the outside space is abolished, and a multi-winged architectural structure of various dimensions is created, which, in addition to the central one, also includes two side wings, shaped like the letter U. Such a castle is clearly open on one side towards the park and the landscape itself.	
Mali Tabor Castle	Hum na Sutli, Krapina-Zagorje County	Castle	15th century	Mali Tabor is a castle in the Croatian Zagorje region, located 3 km west of Hum na Sutli, near the Croatian-Slovenian border on the Sutli River. Mali Tabor is a monument that bears the characteristics of a Renaissance castle and an early Baroque castle. Originally, Mali Tabor was a castle, built in the second half of the 15th century (probably around 1490). Today, Mali Tabor is in a neglected state.	
Mailáth Castle	Donji Miholjac, Osijek-Baranja County	Castle	1903-1906	Mailáth Castle, in Donji Miholjac on the border with Hungary is 20th century castle, considered one of the best-preserved castles in Croatia. The castle was built from 1903 to 1906 for the Hungarian Mailáth family. The architect of the castle is István Möller. A park has been arranged next to the castle. The Donji Miholjac estate was formed in 1831 and was owned by the Valpovo family Hilleprand von Prandau.	
Maruševec Castle	Maruševec, Varaždin County	Castle	16th century	Throughout the mid 19th century, the castle was under numerous hands, until it was bought by Arthur Schlippenbach. He enlarged the castle as it stands today and refurbished it with decor of the period in 1877. In 1881, Count Schlippenbach died in Cairo.	
Medvedgrad	Medvednica, City of Zagreb; 45°52′11″N 15°56′28″E	Castle	1249–1254	Built on southern hillside of mountain Medvednica as a defense from Tatars, who had pillaged Zagreb in 1242. Severely damaged by earthquake in 1590 and described as a ruin by the late 17th century. Renovated in the 1970s, 1980s and 1990s.	
Milengrad	Budinščina municipality, Krapina-Zagorje County	Fortress	13th century	Built in the Ivanšćica mountain as a defense from Mongols, property of Cseszneky, Herkffy and Patachich families, described as a ruin by the late 17th century. Hungarian name: Milen vára.	
Mirabella Fortress (Peovica)	Omiš, Split-Dalmatia County	Fortress	Early 12th century	Mirabela Fortress, also known as Peovica, is located above the Omiš Old Town itself at an altitude of more than 200 meters. It was built in the 13th century and served as an observation post for the enemy, most often the Venetians. From there, Omiš pirates could see enemy galleys, which would cause the city to be on alert even before these ships approached Omiš. Legend has it that during a Turkish attack on the city in the mid-16th century, Omiš defenders shouted and shot so loudly from the top of Mirabela towards the Cetina canyon that the echo gave the impression that there were significantly more defenders than they had estimated, and the Turks abandoned the battle and the city.	
Monkodonja	near Rovinj, Istria County	Old town Fortification	2000 - 1200 BC	Monkodonja was inhabited in the period between 2000 and 1200 BC and it underwent numerous reconstruction phases. The settlement is surrounded by massive drywall and like most other Istrian hill fort settlements is placed on a flattened peak of the hilltop. Monkodonja is an example of prehistoric hillfort settlement architecture.	
Nečven	Promina, Šibenik-Knin County	Fortress	14th century	Nečven Castle, locally known as Utvrda Nečven, lies west of the hamlet of Puljane, in the county of Šibenik-Knin in Croatia. Nečven Castle was built during the 13th century by the Nelipić family, local Croatian nobles from Knin. Although according to legend, it was already constructed in the 9th century. It was built on a high cliff above the left bank of the Krka River.	
Nehaj Fortress	Senj, Lika-Senj County	Fortress	16th century	The Nehaj Fortress is a fortress on the hill Nehaj in the town of Senj, Croatia. Nehaj Fortress is situated at an altitude of 49 m. It was built by Croatian army general Ivan Lenković, a captain of the Uskoks, on the hill Nehaj. Finished in 1558, it was built on the remains of ruined churches, monasteries and houses which were situated outside of the walls of Senj. These buildings were scrapped since it was concluded that they would not survive anyway if they were outside the city walls, as the Ottomans would loot them or use them as housing during sieges.	
Nehaj Fortress	Kaštel Štafilić, Split-Dalmatia County	Fortress	16th century	West of the Štafileo castle, on a cliff in the sea, the brothers Ludovik and Ivan Lodi began building their castle in 1548 with the permission of the Trogir prince Garzoni. The castle remained unfinished, because the Lodi brothers died during construction. At the end of the 17th century, the fortress passed into the ownership of the noble family of Split, the Papalić. The fortress, although unfinished, served its purpose, and Uskok refugees from Klis settled around it, who called the castle and the settlement Nehaj after their fortress near Senj.	
Nesactium	Glavica hill, near Valtura, Istria County	Old town Fortification	1200-500 BC	The archaeological site Nesactium is located on the Glavica hill near Valtura, east of Pula, above a fertile valley and the Budava Bay. Nesactium is thought to have been the seat of the Histri, a people of the Indo-European descent who were formed in the early Iron Age after the settlement of today's Istria peninsula. The oldest traces of the hill located settlement stem from the Bronze and Iron Ages.	
Nova Kraljevica	Kraljevica, Primorje-Gorski Kotar County	Castle	17th century	The castle is on the hill of a peninsula, at the very entrance of the Bay of Bakar, Petar Zrinski began to build it in 1651. As the residence of a powerful feudal dynasty, it followed the then architectural style of aristocrats. Similar castles appeared throughout Europe, testifying to the social status of their owners with masses of superb decorative details. The builders, most likely Venetians, arranged the large rectangular complex (44 metres long and 36 metres wide) with four large towers situated at the corners.	
Novigrad Castle	Novigrad, Zadar County	Castle	13th century	'Fortica' is a ruined castle on hill above Novigrad, Zadar County.	
Novigrad na Dobri	Novigrad na Dobri, Karlovac County; 45°28′55″N 15°27′10″E	Castle	14th century	This castle once belonged to the famous Croatian family Frankopan, but after the death of its owner, Fran Krsto Frankopan, it was robbed by Austrian general Herbstein. He later sold it to the knights of the catholic Order of Malta who kept it under their rule until 1746. After them, the owners of the castle became the Croatian noble family Patačić and the members of this family lived in the castle until the beginning of 20th century. During the World War II, Novigrad na Dobri was seriously damaged but the enchanting beauty of its ruins still gives proof of its rich history.	
Novi Zrin	Donja Dubrava, Međimurje County	Demolished Castle	17th century	Novi Zrin was a Fortificated Castle in Donja Dubrava, Međimurje County of Zrinski family, built in purpose to prevent Ottoman military forces from attacking. In June 1664, large Ottoman army with up to 100,000 men, destroyed it in the siege of Novi Zrin.	
Fort Nutjak	near Trilj, Split-Dalmatia County	Fortress	15th century	Nutjak Castle, locally known as Utvrda Nutjak, lies south of the village of Gardun, in the county of Split-Dalmatia in Croatia. Nutjak Castle was built at the end of the 15th century by Žarko Dražojević, Duke of Poljica. In 1492, Pope Innocent VIII devoted resources collected during a pilgrimage to Klis and Sinj to the upkeep of Nutjak.	
Obrovac Castle ('Gradina Obrovac')	Obrovac, Zadar County	Fortress	14th century	Obrovac Castle was first mentioned in 1337. It is situated around a hill in a bend of the Zrmanja River. The town and castle were taken by the Ottoman Empire in 1527. At that time, the castle probably had a square shape with 4 corner towers. In 1687 the Ottomans were driven out by the Venetians. They then rebuilt the castle.	
Okić Castle	Okić, Samobor, Zagreb County; 45.7489218°N 15.7067853°E	Fortress	11th century	Medieval Okić Fortress is rare example of preserved Romanesque architecture in continental Croatia. The town was ruled by the counts Okićki, Babonići, Bevenudi, Frankopani, Matijaš Korvin, Ivan Horvat and finally the Erdödy family, in whose time, as early as 1616, the Okić fortress became abandoned and ruined.	
Opeka Manor	Vinica, Varaždin County; 46°19′30″N 16°08′52″E	Manor	17th century	It was built in the Baroque style in the second half of the 17th century, and is believed to have been named after a primitive brickyard on the site of which a small lake now stands. The first owners were the counts of the Keglević family. After World War II, the castle served various purposes. After nationalization, it was converted into the residence of Josip Broz Tito, during his stay in the Zelendvor hunting grounds. The castle and arboretum have been protected cultural heritage of the Republic of Croatia since December 2007. The castle is in a dilapidated condition, and was saved from decay by renovations completed in 2024.	
Oršić Castle	Gornja Stubica, Krapina-Zagorje County	Castle	18th century	It was built in 1756 by Croatian count Krsto II Oršić (1718–1782) on the site of a previous fortress from the Middle Ages and designed in an L-shaped ground plan. From the backyard side, both the wings are open in arcades that follow the line of the corridor, while the outside frontage is quite simple, with rhythmically aligned windows and a few rustic details in the corners.	
Oršić Castle	Gornja Bistra, Zagreb County	Castle	18th century	Count Krsto Oršić constructed the castle in 1756 on the site of a medieval fortress, and the family maintained residence until 1924. The interior chapel displays illusionist murals and a baroque altar, representing the artistic preferences of eighteenth-century Croatian nobility.	
Oršić-Slavetić Castle	Slavetić, Zagreb County	Castle	16th century	Oršić Castle is located on the edge of the Slavetić settlement. It was built in the early 16th century by the noble Oršić family, who still own it today. The castle is characterized by a dense structure and an organic addition of volumes of various shapes and dimensions around a small rectangular courtyard. The fortress was rebuilt and expanded on several occasions, changing its basic function to a residential country house.	
Ivanec Castle	Ivanec, Varaždin County	Demolished castle	16th century	The Pethö de Gerse family built a castle in Ivanec in the first half of the 16th century. Not much is known about its origins, construction and appearance. In 1564, King Ferdinand confirmed the town of Bela, the Ivanec castle (Ivancz cum castello) and other estates to the Pethö family. II. In 1632, a castle in Ivanec was mentioned, traditionally built from the ruins of an old Crusader church. Ivanec Castle changed many times during its history from a castle to a castle. Traces of numerous generations and different owners remain, and different stylistic features have been mixed. During the Second World War, the castle was damaged, and after the war it was demolished. Only a few photographs of the castle and the site where it was located remain, today landscaped as a city park.	
Otočac Fortress	Otočac, Lika-Senj County	Fortress	17th century	Fortica Fortress in Otočac, an early modern hill fortification of triangular shape on the northern edge of the town in Gacko Polje, Lika-Senj County. It is located in a strategic location on the Fortica hill above Otočac, from which a view of part of the Gacka Valley extends. Once a military and defensive stronghold on the line of defense against the Turks, today it is a ruin, which has recently been partially restored.	
Ozalj Castle	Ozalj, Karlovac County; 45°36′51″N 15°28′14″E	Castle	Mid-16th century	The oldest part of the castle, Zrinski Palace, was built by Nikola Šubić Zrinski ten years before his death at the Battle of Szigetvár. His son Juraj IV Zrinski built the entry tower in 1599. The castle was renewed and repaired by count Theodor Batthyani (died 1813).	
Paz	Cerovlje, Istria County	Ruined castle	13th century	Historical sources mention the feudal estate from the late 13th century, when it was ruled by members of the De Pas, Walderstein, Barbo and finally Auersperg families. Today, only scanty architectural remains of the fortress can be recognized on the ground. The tower is structurally and stylistically connected to the representative and harmoniously designed palace building, which also incorporated the older tower, and whose facades are articulated by regularly arranged large window openings with profiled skylights.	
Pazin Castle	Pazin, Istria County	Castle	10th century	Pazin Castle is the largest and best-preserved medieval building in all of Istria. The castle was first mentioned in 983, and over the centuries various architectural styles were added to it. At the foot of the castle walls, which were accessed via a drawbridge, is the mouth of the Pazin Cave. The castle and the Pazin Cave are the setting for the novel Mathias Sandorf, written by Jules Verne, the father of science fiction. Today, the Pazin Castle houses the Ethnographic Museum of Istria, where you can see materials related to the life of the inhabitants of the Istrian peninsula.	
Pejačević Castle in Našice	Našice, Osijek-Baranja county	Castle	1811–1812 (19th century)	Našice Castle was first built in 1811–1812, on the northern edge of the main square in Našice. The castle was home to generations of members of Pejačević noble family, which has been present in the city since 1734. At that time, it was a one-story, relatively simple castle in the style of late Baroque classicism, and on this site it replaced an older residential building of the Pejačević family, a manor house. During its existence, the castle changed its appearance significantly several times. Today, the museum is the location of Našice Local History Museum.	
Pejačević Castle in Osijek	Retfala, suburb of Osijek, Osijek-Baranja County	Castle	1796–1801; 19th century	The Baroque-Classicist castle of the Pejačević family in Retfala, built in the first phase in 1801, It was built in the shape of the letter U, surrounded by a large park, which today has been completely reduced and reduced to a neglected environment. Not far from the castle, the family also built a mausoleum in 1891, in the neo-Baroque style, designed by architect Viktor Siedek, and it is considered one of the highest quality examples of neo-Baroque architecture in Croatia.	
Pejačević Castle in Virovitica	Virovitica, Virovitica-Podravina County	Castle	1800–1804, 19th century	Pejačević Castle is located in the center of Virovitica, built on the site of a former medieval fortress. It is one in a series of Slavonian castles owned by the famous Pejačević family, known by their noble title “Pejačevići Virovitički”, meaning the Pejačevićs of Virovitica. The Pejačevićs built it between 1800 and 1804 according to the designs of the Viennese architect N. Roth. The castle was owned by them until the middle of the 19th century	
Pietrapelosa	Buzet, Istria County	Ruined Castle	10th century	The castle, which stands above the Bračana River Valley, is the second largest on the Istrian peninsula. Known for the moss that has always grown up its sides, its name is made up of the Italian words meaning "hairy stone." Pietrapelosa was constructed during the Middle Ages. Its first mention is from around 965 AD. The castle was laid out in an elongated shape to work with the narrow ridge of the hill it sits on.	
Posert Castle	Cerovlje, Istria County	Ruined Fortress	11th–14th centuries	Posert Castle (also known as Šabec) is a ruined fortress near Paz and Šušnjevica. The fortress was built in 11th century while the other part of the castle was built in 14th century according to archeological evidence. Due to its condition, the castle was recently renovated to preserve its beauty.	
Prandau-Normann Castle	Valpovo, Osijek-Baranja County; 45°39′33″N 18°24′55″E	Castle	18th century	Prandau-Normann Castle is one of the oldest and largest castles in Slavonia, and it is among the most valuable historical architectural complexes of secular architecture in northern Croatia. It was first built as a fortification in 14th century, and then the castle was built in the middle in 18th century in baroque style.	
Potravlje Fortress	Svilaja, Split-Dalmatia County	Fortress	14th century	Potravlje Fortress (or Travnik) is fortress on the mountain Svilaja in Potravlje village. The medieval fortress was first mentioned in 1372 as part of the estate of the noble Nelipić family. The fortress has a triangular ground plan with very well-preserved ramparts and a prominent semicircular tower on the southeast corner, which is partly based on the ramparts and tower of an earlier fortification. There was also an entrance with stairs on the south side.	
Prozor Fortress	Vrlika, Split-Dalmatia County	Fortress	15th century	Built by the Hrvatinić family, the fortress was captured by the Turks in 1523. The Turks held the fortress for two centuries, until they were expelled by the Venetians. The Prozor Fortress (Gradina) and its surroundings are a protected cultural heritage.	
Ribnik Castle	Ribnik, Karlovac County	Castle	13th century	Ribnik is a fortified town southwest of Ozalj, in the Obvrh Creek Valley. In the 13th–14th centuries the estate was the property of the Baboni family and Ban Mikac. In 1394, it was acquired by the Frankopans, who built the town we see today. Ribnik is surrounded by a moat crossed by a drawbridge. The fortress has two floors and is partly built of well-cut stone.	
Ružica grad	Mountain Papuk, near Orahovica, Virovitica-Podravina County	Fortress	13th century	Ružica grad is located 2.5 km southwest of Orahovica at 378 m above sea level, surrounded by a property of about 8000 m2. The hillfort stretches in a north–south direction, on the north side it has a natural defensive wall in the form of a steep cliff, and on the south side towers and ramparts have been built. The first written mention of Ružica dates back to 1228, and the historical mention of the castle itself dates back to 1357, where it is listed as royal property. Until 1543, Ružica Castle was in the hands of various noblemen, such as Nikola Kont Orahovicka, who is assumed to be the likely client of the construction, and Lovro Iločki from the noble Iločki family, then Ladislav Više, the Pomanicki brothers and others.	
Samobor Castle	Samobor, Zagreb County; 45°47′56″N 15°41′53″E	Fortress	12th century	Samobor Castle (Okić-grad), an ancient fortress that is considered one of our oldest fortified towns and a rare example of preserved Romanesque architecture in continental Croatia. The first record mentioning Okić-grad dates back to 1193 in a charter of Bishop Kalan of Pécs. Over the centuries, the city was ruled by the Okić princes, the Babonićs, the Bevenudis, the Frankopans, Matthias Corvinus, Ivan Horvat and finally the Erdödy family, during whose time, in 1616, the Okić fortress became a ruin.	
Sinj Fortress	Sinj, Split-Dalmatia County	Fortress	14th century	Sinj Castle, locally known as Utvrda or Tvrđava Sinj, and sometimes as Stari Grad Sinj, lies above the town of the same name, in the county of Split-Dalmatia in Croatia. The castle stayed under Ottoman rule until 1686, when it was conquered by the Venetians. In 1808 Sinj Castle was finally abandoned after it had been mined by French troops in retaliation for a local rebellion. Its ruinous remains were finished by the 1898 Trilj Earthquake.	
Sisak Fortress	Sisak, Sisak-Moslavina County; 45°29′16″N 16°22′26″E	Fortress	1544–1550	Built according to the order of the Bishop of Zagreb, the owner of the estate, following the increasingly threatening and devastating Turkish attacks on the Kingdom of Croatia. Today it houses the local town museum.	
Slunj Castle	Slunj, Karlovac County	Fortress	12th century	The first historical references mentioning Slunj date back to the 12th century. The fortified town dates back to 1323. The fortifications built by the Franks were meant to protect them from Ottoman invasions. Ultimately, the city suffered the assaults of the invaders and capitulated in the 16th century. It was rebuilt in the 17th century and became a military fort under the rule of the Habsburgs.	
Sokolac Castle	Brinje, Lika-Senj County	Fortress	15th century	Sokolac Castle back to medieval times, while the town was held by the noble Frankopan and Gorjanski families. The castle was part of an important medieval fortified city held by Frankopan family. The cast was documented first time in 1411. Sokolac Castle was an extremely grand building, dominated by the powerful perpendiculars of the entry tower, and the Chapel of the Holy Trinity. The entry into the burg was through a square, three-storey tower, the façades of which were relieved with lesenes linked at the top with blind arcades, making it a unique specimen in the whole of Central Europe.	
Starigrad Fortress (Fortica)	Omiš, Split-Dalmatia County	Fortress	15th century	Throughout the 16. century (1534., 1559., 1566., 1571.-1573., 1586.) the fortress Starigrad was reinforced several times due to a growing danger of Turkish attacks. Major repair works were done during the Kandian war (1654.-1669.) By the end of the century Omiš is not anymore in Venetian – Turkish frontier area and with the spreading of free territory the strategic importance of this fortress decreases.	
Skrad castle	Barilović, Karlovac County	Castle	15th century	The old town of Skrad is situated on a “tooth” above the Korana River, on the northwestern ridge of Skradska Gora. Its ruined remains are mostly hidden in the forest, with the exception of the southwestern walls facing the Korana, which are therefore the only ones visible from a distance, from the Korana river. Skrad was a very large town, surrounded by three high walls in the more difficult to defend part. Until the 15th century, life flourished in it, but then it slowly began to die out under the onslaught of Ottoman incursions.	
Šarengrad castle	Šarengrad, Vukovar-Srijem County	Fortress	15th century	The fortress in Šarengrad was built in the 15th century, and was commissioned by Ban Ivan Morović. It was named Voćin. Ban Morović also commissioned the construction of the church and monastery of Saints Peter and Paul in the town. It is known that throughout its turbulent history, the fortress often changed owners. In the 16th century, the Turks captured Šarengrad, as well as numerous other fortresses on the Danube. They allegedly maintained the fortress well. In the 17th century, Šarengrad was taken over by the Austrian army and then by the Counts of Eltz.	
St. Nicholas Fortress	Šibenik, Šibenik-Knin County	Fortress	16th century	The Fortress of St. Nicholas, located at the entrance to the St. Anthony Channel in Šibenik, as a unique building of Venetian Renaissance fortification architecture, is a monument of world architectural heritage in the Mediterranean. It is the only Venetian military fortress located exclusively at sea. It was built in the 16th century on the islet of Ljuljevac, on the site of the former Benedictine monastery of St. Nicholas, after which it was named. In 2017, the Fortress of St. Nicholas was inscribed on the UNESCO World Heritage List as part of the joint transnational nomination Defense Systems of the Republic of Venice in the Period from the 16th to the 17th Centuries.	
St. Michael Fort	Preko, Zadar County; 44°04′19″N 15°09′35″E	Fortress	11th century	The Fortress of St. Michael on It was built on the hill of the same name (265m) in the 13th century by the Venetians after the capture and destruction of Zadar. There was previously a Benedictine monastery of St. Michael on this site from the end of the 11th century. From this position you can see Zadar, and to the south and west the view extends to many islands and parts of the Kornati National Park in the distance.	
Šumber	Sveta Nedelja, Istria County	Castle	13th century	Šumber medieval castle with its lower ward was built at the place of the former pre-historical hillfort in the Old town small village. In 1260, the castle came into the possession of Schönberg - the Austrian noble family, after whom Šumber was named. Since 1367, it has been a part of the Pazin principality and has become a border fortress between the Austrian and Venetian part of Istria. Due to the extinction of the Schönberg family, Šumber became part of the Kožljak settlement at the end of the 14th century.	
Tkalec Manor	Štrigova, Međimurje County	Manor	18th century	Tkalec Manor (Croatian: Dvorac Tkalec or Kurija Tkalec) is a baroque building situated next to the village of Štrigova in Međimurje County, northern Croatia. It was built in the mid-18th century and first owned by the members of the Pauline Catholic Order in Štrigova, until their order was abolished by the Croato-Hungarian king Joseph II of Habsburg in 1786. In the 19th century it was owned by the counts of Zichy, who had estates in the neighbouring Slovenian region of Prekmurje as well. Before the national independence of Croatia, it was run until 1990 by a local peasants' agricultural cooperative society. After that it was privatized.	
Topana Castle	Imotski, Split-Dalmatia County	Fortress	10th century	Topana Castle, locally known as Tvrđava Topana, lies above the town of Imotski, in the county of Split-Dalmatia in Croatia. The cliff on which the castle is situated forms a natural defensive site, as it was between 2 deep sinkholes. So, already in prehistoric times there was a hill fort here. The east sinkhole was partially filled in during the 1970s, after which a football stadium was installed there. A castle at Imotski was first mentioned, as a strong fortress, in the 10th century, by the Byzantine emperor Constantine VII. So it was probably first built by the Byzantines on the remains of the earlier hill fort.	
Trakošćan Castle	Bednja, Varaždin County; 46°15′33″N 15°57′00″E	Castle	13th century	Trakošćan was built in the late 13th century as part of the defence fortification network of northwestern Croatia. It was a small fortress serving as an observation post overlooking the road from Ptuj towards the Bednja valley.Drašković family occupied the castle until the early 20th century. The castle is considered to be the most notable of all castles and most preserved in Croatia.	
Trsat Castle	Trsat hill, Rijeka, Primorje-Gorski Kotar County	Castle	13th century	Trsat Castle is a castle on Trsat hill, above the city of Rijeka. It was first mentioned as the seat of a parish in 1288 when the famous Vinodol Law was drawn up. The Church of St. George below the castle was the seat of a parish that coincided with the territory of the lordship. Trsat Castle is one of the oldest fortifications on the Croatian Littoral, preserving the features of early medieval town planning.	
Tržan Castle in Modruš	Modruš, Karlovac County	Fortress	11th century	Tržan-grad, a medieval fortress on a steep hill above the fortified town of Modruš on the eastern slopes of Velika Kapela, once (from the 11th century) the administrative seat of the vast Modruš County, and today a ruin in the southern part of Karlovac County. It reached its peak and peak in the 14th and 15th centuries, when it was the seat of members of the powerful Croatian princely family Frankopan, and when it was the seat of a bishop.	
Tvrdalj Castle	Stari Grad, Split-Dalmatia County	Palace	16th century	Fortified summer palace of the poet Petar Hektorović. During the 16th century, the island of Hvar came under attack from the Ottoman Turks. Hektorović, one of the local nobles, undertook to fortify his house so that it could act as shelter for the local citizens.	
Udbina Castle	Udbina, Lika-Senj County	Ruined Fortress	14th century	Udbina Fortress was a medieval fortress. Today it is a ruin at the Gradina archaeological site. It was built not far from the old parish fortress of Krbava Castle. The old castle was in an unfavorable defensive position, and the increasingly frequent incursions of the Ottoman army and Wallachian martolozi into this area forced the commanders to decide to abandon it.	
Varaždin Castle	Varaždin, Varaždin County	Castle	12th century	Varaždin Castle, or Old town Varaždin is a Castle in the city of Varaždin, and one of its most famous landmarks. It is located on the northwestern edge of the Varaždin city center, and today it houses the Varaždin City Museum. The fortress was first mentioned in the 12th century and is believed to have been the seat of the Varaždin prefects at that time. At the end of the 14th century, it came into the ownership of the Counts of Celje, who rebuilt it in the Gothic style. The central square tower, around which there were originally wooden palisades, dates from that time. The fortress underwent a major renovation in the 16th century, when it was rebuilt into a modern Renaissance fortification.	
Veliki Bukovec Castle	Veliki Bukovec, Varaždin County	Castle	18th century (1745–1755)	Veliki Bukovac Castle (Dvorac Drašković) is a castle in Veliki Bukovec. Already in the 16th century, a fortress was built in Veliki Bukovac, which served as a refuge for the surrounding population (from Turkish ravages). In the mid-17th century, Count Ivan Drašković transformed the Veliki Bukovac estate into a manor house, with a noble manor house in Veliki Bukovac. The castle was built in the mid-18th century and was a favorite residence of the Counts Drašković. At the end of the 20th century, the castle and park were renovated for the needs of the new owner.	
Veliki Tabor Castle	Desinić, Krapina-Zagorje County; 46°09′17″N 15°39′05″E	Castle	Early 16th century	Perched on top of a hill, at an altitude of 334 m (1,096 ft), the castle had many owners, among them Ratkaj family and Oton Iveković, a Croatian painter. Today it houses several art and antique collections.	
Vitturi Castle	Kaštel Lukšić, Split-Dalmatia County; 43°33′18″N 16°22′05″E				
Vrana Castle	Vrana, Zadar County		Early 12th century		
Vrgorac Castle					
Zadvarje Castle	Split-Dalmatia County		1478–1482		
Zajezda Castle					
Zichy-Terbocz Manor					
Zrin Castle			13th Century		
Zrinski-Frankopan Castle	Severin na Kupi, Primorje-Gorski Kotar County; 45°25′17″N 15°10′08″E	Castle	16th century	Castle (palace) with the park in Severin na Kupi was the estate of an aristocrat family Frankopan. The castle was first mentioned in 1558. It is one store building with square ground plan and internal yard and halls with arcades, and outside corner cylindrical towers. There is the part around the castle with a chapel St. Florian. Today's Baroque palace is result of ample reconstruction made in 1803 by owner of that time Count John Oršia.	

== See also ==
- List of castles
- Military history of Croatia
- Walls of Dubrovnik
- Walls of Ston
