= Cippico =

Cippico may refer to:

- Cippico (surname), a surname
- Cippico Castle, a castle in Kaštel Novi, Dalmatia, Croatia

== See also ==
- Ćipiko
