= House of Mlakovečki =

Mlakovečki (Malakóczy)
- Croatian noble family
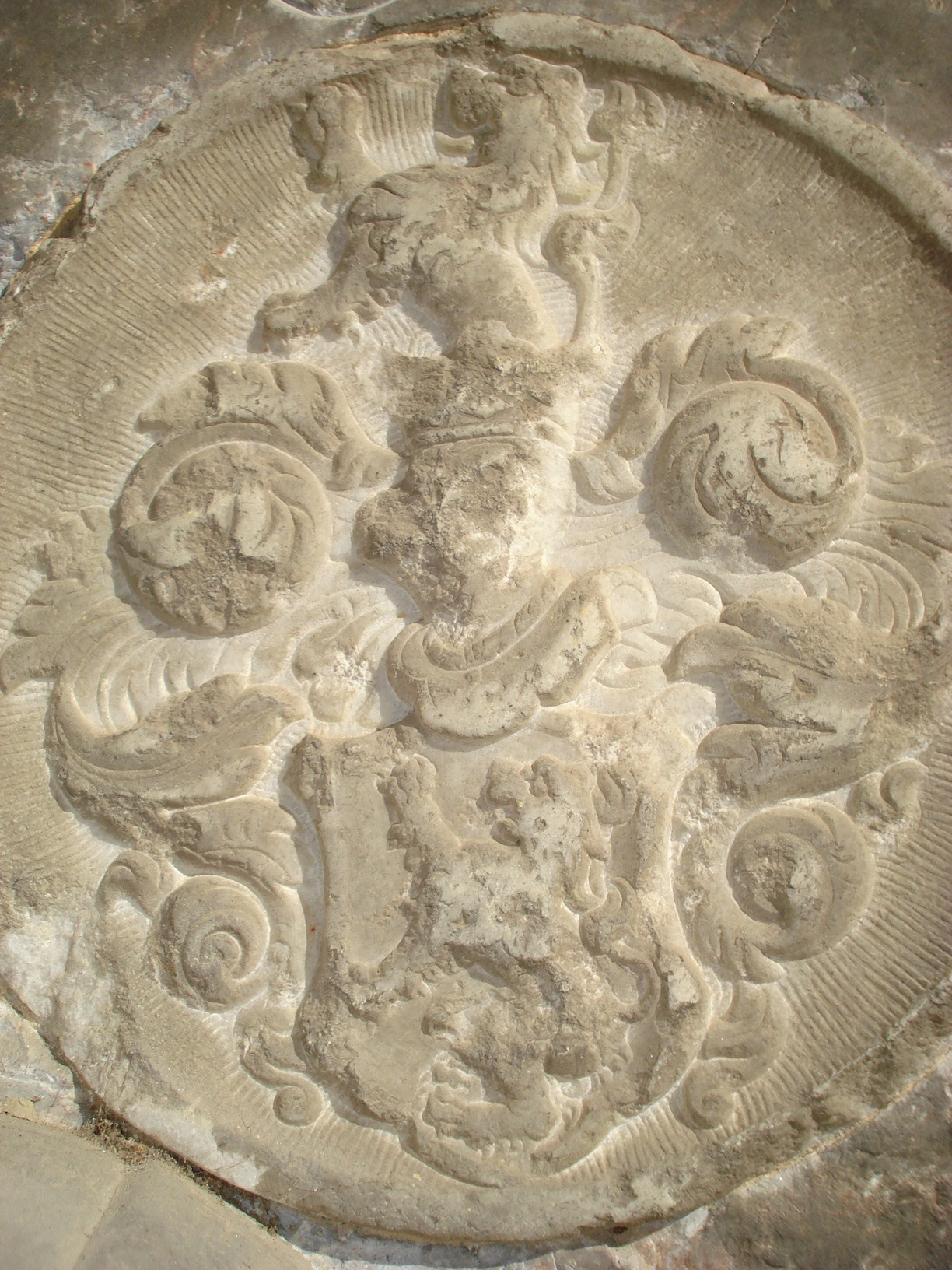
- Family coat of arms
- Country: Kingdom of Croatia in the Habsburg Monarchy
- Founded: 16th century
- Current head: extinct
- Final ruler: Nikola III Mlakovečki
- Titles: baron
- Estates: Jurovec, Lapšina, Gradiščak, Bukovje, Žabnik, Vratišinec, Novakovec, Susedgrad, Opeka, Oroslavje, Stubički Golubovec
- Dissolution: 1667 (?)

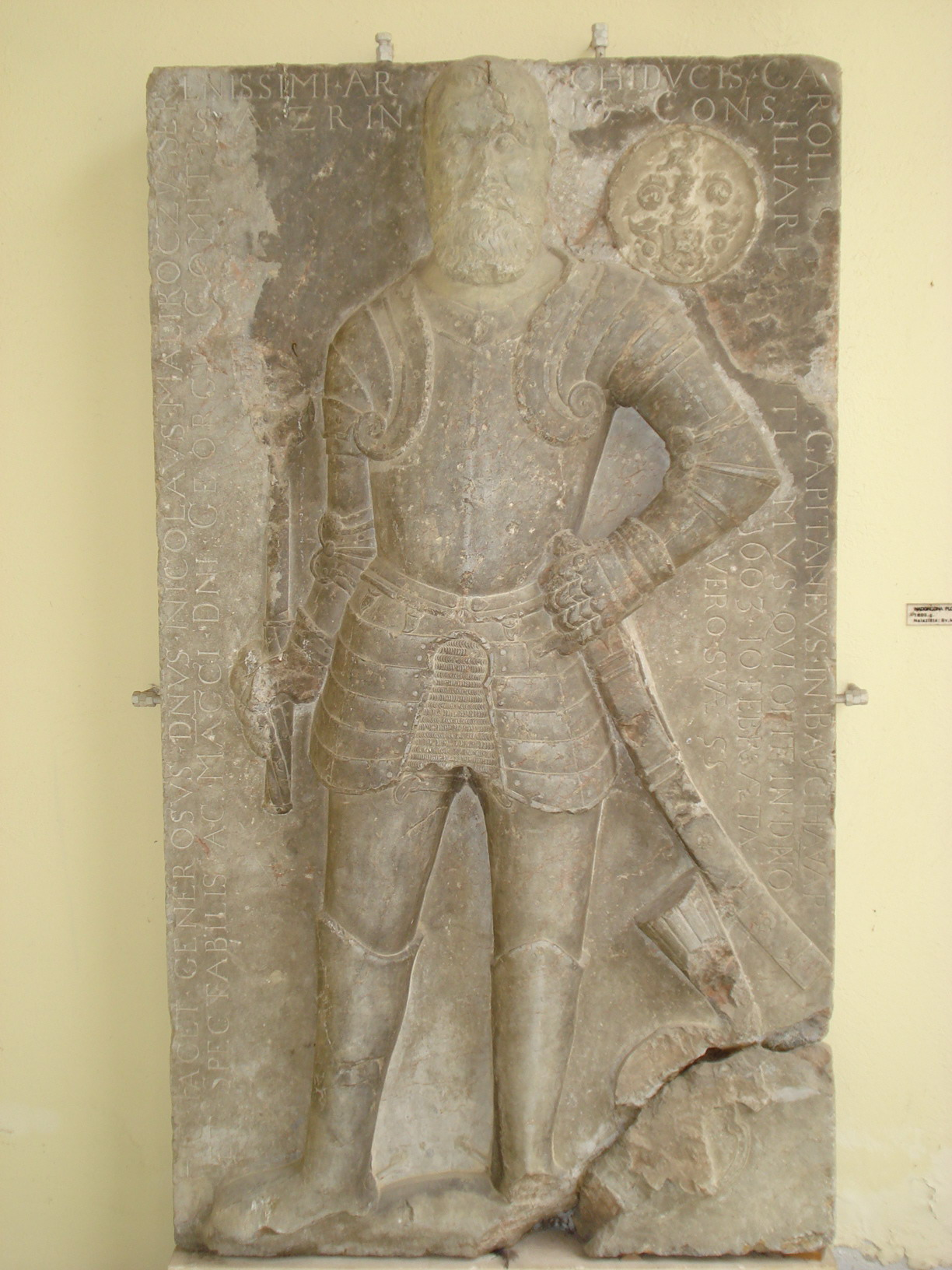
Tombstone of Nikola I Mlakovečki (*1547; †1603) in the Međimurje County Museum in Čakovec

The House of Mlakovečki (Croatian: Mlakovečki, Hungarian: Malakóczy) was a Croatian noble family that reached its peak in the 16th and 17th century. Members of the family were connected through marriage to the important and influential Zrinski noble family from northern Croatia and were appointed to several military ranks and other positions.

== Family history ==
In the Međimurje microregion, members of the family have been mentioned in written sources since the first half of the 16th century. On 4th April 1540, Gašpar Ernušt sold the entire Jurovec estate near Sveti Martin na Muri to Ivan Simonić Mlakovečki. Croato-Hungarian King Ferdinand I of Habsburg confirmed this transaction twice later, in 1552 and 1554. This fact is important because his neighbour and the owner of most of Međimurje from 1542 to 1556 was Nikola Šubić Zrinski, Ban (Viceroy) of Croatia, the most famous and powerful Croatian nobleman of his time.

Ivan's successor, Nikola I Mlakovečki (* 1547; † 1603), had very good relations with Juraj IV Zrinski, the son of the Croatian Ban. Both converted to Protestantism and spread it together. Nikola bought several additional manors from Zrinski and expanded his property in northern Međimurje. It included Jurovec, Lapšina, Gradiščak, Bukovje, Žabnik, Vratišinec and Novakovec. He himself was known as a very robust and strong man and served as commander of military units in southern Hungary in numerous battles against the Ottoman Turks. After his death, he was buried in Sveti Martin na Muri, and his gravestone has been preserved. It is now exhibited in the Međimurje County Museum in Čakovec.

Nikola II Mlakovečki, son of the previous one, became baron in 1614 and acquired new possessions. He was the lord of Susedgrad near Zagreb, one of the most important castles in central Croatia, and was considered the richest and most respected Protestant nobleman in Croatia. After the death of the young Croatian Ban Juraj V Zrinski in 1626 in the military camp near Bratislava, Nikola II married his widow Magdalena (née Széchy). He was mentioned in a 1641 letter from Zagreb bishop Benedikt Vinković, in which the bishop asked the baron to renounce Protestantism and convert to Catholicism, but this was unsuccessful.

In addition to Susedgrad and smaller estates in Međimurje, the family also owned the estates of Opeka, Oroslavje and Stubički Golubovec. Nikola III Mlakovečki, the successor of Nikola II, was last mentioned in 1667. After his death there is no further information about that family in historical sources available.

== Castles and manor houses ==
Lapšina	Stubički Golubovec	Oroslavje

== See also ==
- List of noble families of Croatia
- Croatia in personal union with Hungary
- History of Croatia
- List of castles in Croatia
