= Suor =

Suor may refer to:

- Suor Angelica, an opera by Puccini
- Suor Emanuelle, a 1977 film
- Suor Letizia, "The Awakening" (1956 film)
- Suor Prudenza Cambi (d. 1601), Florentine nun artist
- Suor Barbara Ragnoni (1448–1533), Italian artist
- Suor Orsola Benincasa University of Naples
- Sweat (novel), in Portuguese: Suor
- Suor Uyata, a range in Yakutia
