= Cambi =

Cambi is a surname. Notable people with the surname include:

- Carlotta Cambi (born 1996), Italian volleyball player
- Suor Prudenza Cambi (died 1601), Florentine/Italian nun and artist
- Ulisse Cambi (1807–1895), Italian sculptor

== See also ==
- Cambi castle, a castle in Croatia
