= Kaštel Kambelovac =

- Settlement
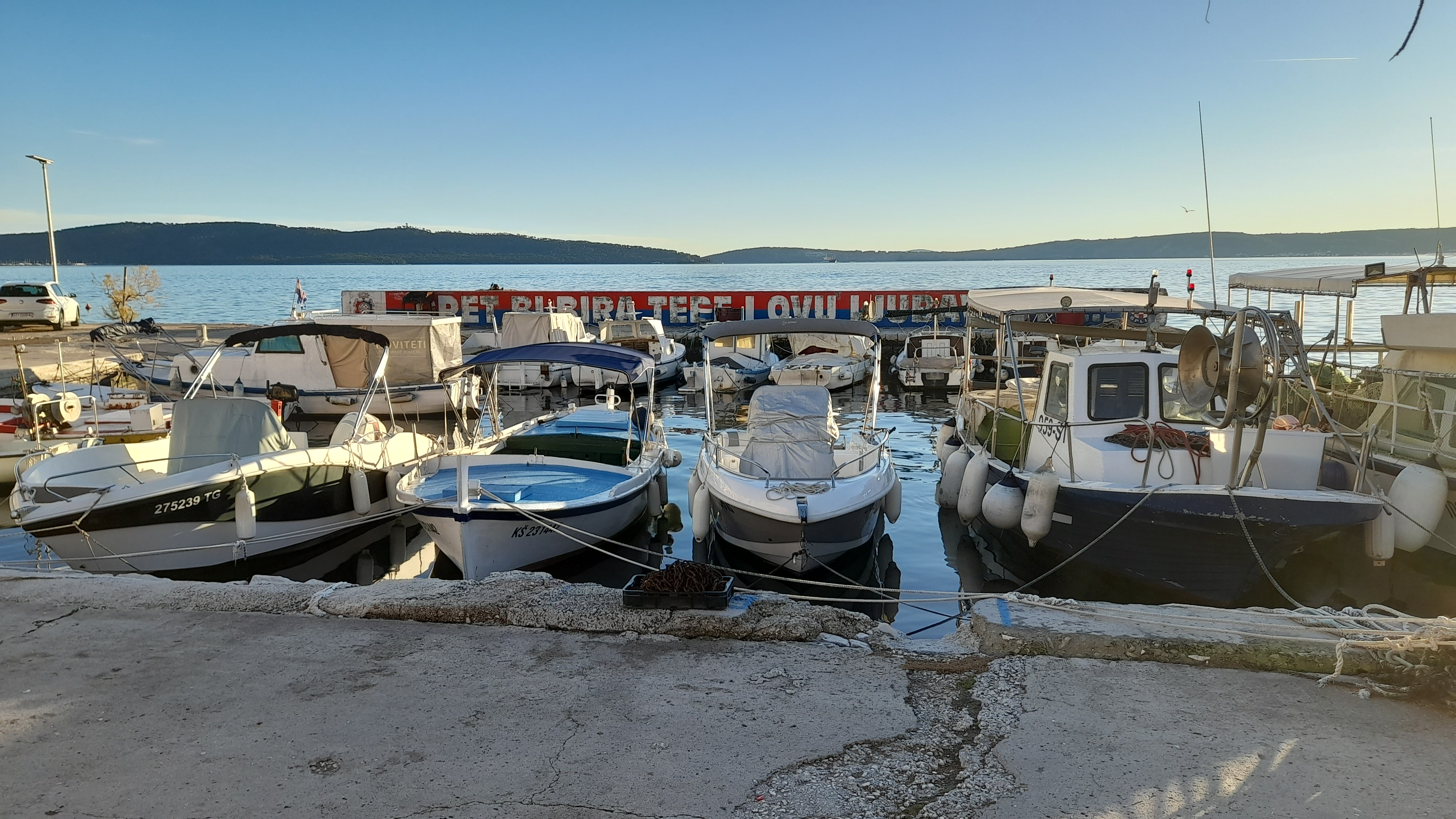
- Kaštel Kambelovac port

- Location within Croatia
- Coordinates: 43°33′00″N 16°22′59″E
- Country: Croatia
- County: Split-Dalmatia
- City: Kaštela

Area
  - Total: 4.3 km^{2} (1.7 sq mi)

Population (2021)
  - Total: 5,051
  - Density: 1,200/km^{2} (3,000/sq mi)
- Time zone: UTC+1 (CET)
  - Summer (DST): UTC+2 (CEST)

Kaštel Kambelovac is a settlement within the town of Kaštela in Dalmatia, Croatia.

== History ==
Kaštel Kambelovac was built by the aristocratic family Cambi from Split (1589). In 1517 noblemen and landowners from Split, brothers Jerolim and Nikola Cambi, built a castle (Cambi Castle) on an islet to protect themselves and residents of Lažan and Kruševik settlements. The castle was cylindrically shaped (only one in Kaštela) and very suitable for defense. The citadel was surrounded by the sea but was later connected with the mainland by filling up and levelling.
