= Church of SS Cosmas and Damian, Kaštel Gomilica =

Church of SS Cosmas and Damian
- Location: Kaštel Gomilica, Croatia
- Country: Croatia
- Denomination: Roman Catholic

Architecture
- Style: Romanesque
- Years built: 1138-1160

The Church of SS Cosmas and Damian (Croatian: Sv Kuzma i Damjan) is a Roman Catholic church in Kaštel Gomilica, Croatia.

== Sources ==
- Marasović, Duško (1993). Sv. Kuzma i Damjan u Kaštel Gomilici (in Croatian). Zavod za zaštitu spomenika kulture - Split.
