= Lapšina Castle =

Castle in Međimurje County, Croatia

- Lapšina, Međimurje County, Croatia
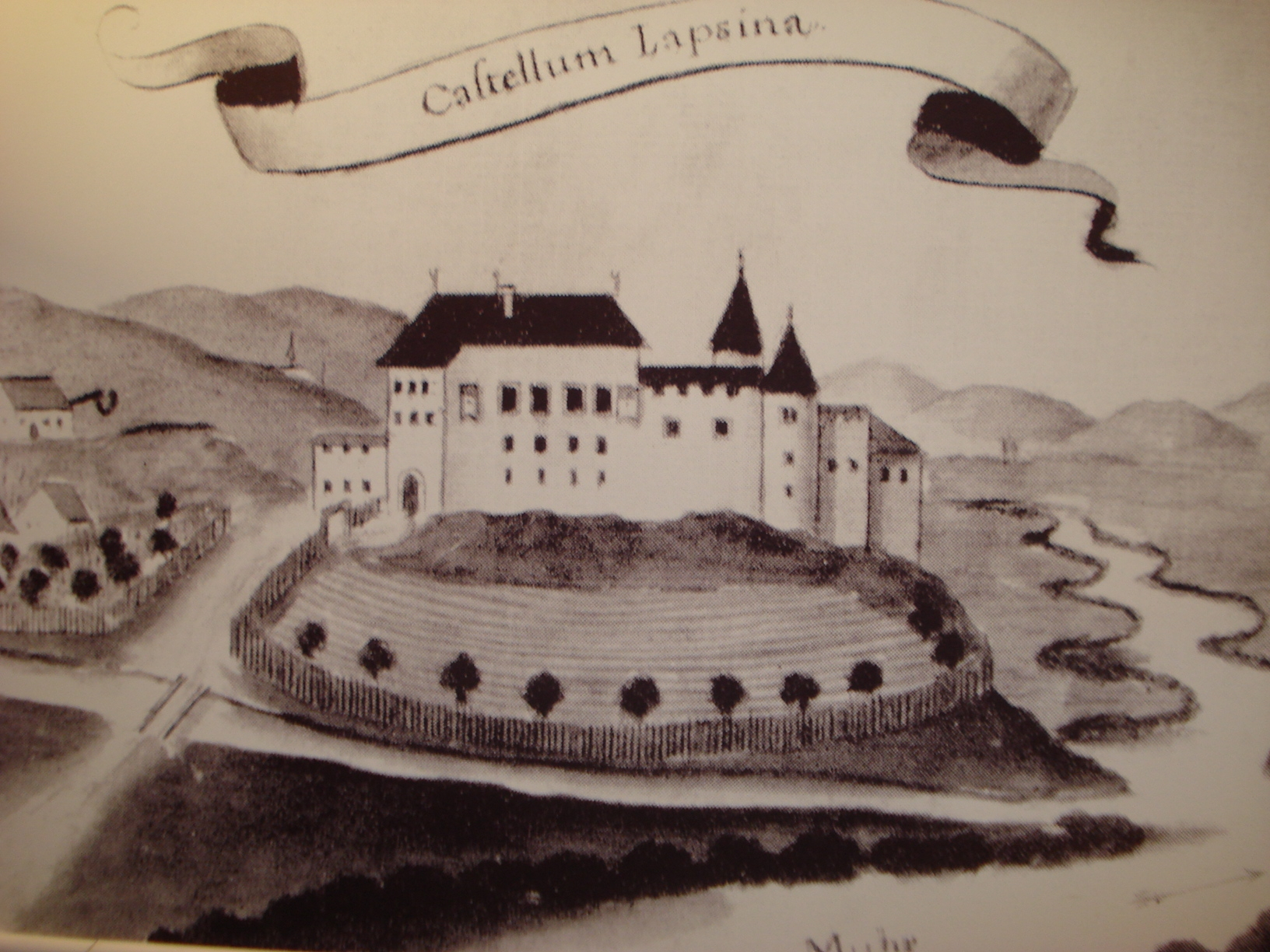
- Ruined

Site information
- Type: Hilltop castle
- Condition: ruins

Location
- Coordinates: 46.521944°N 16.336944°E

Site history
- Built: 16th century
- Built by: Juraj IV Zrinski or Nikola I. Mlakovečki

Lapšina Castle (Croatian: Dvorac Lapšina) is a former early modern fortified structure in the village of Lapšina, municipality of Sveti Martin na Muri, Međimurje County, Croatia. Built on the top of a hill in the 16th century, it was originally the residence of the members of the Mlakovečki noble family, who had some smaller estates in Međimurje. It changed owners several times during centuries, later became poorly maintained, so that in the first decades of the 20th century only ruins remained of it.

== History ==
According to available sources, the castle was built in the second half of the 16th century by Juraj IV Zrinski or his knight and advisor Nikola I Mlakovečki, with whom Zrinski was in very good relations. Before the castle was built, Mlakovečki owned the nearby castle Gradiščak, which, according to a legend about the unhappy love between him and the girl called Izabela Petroci, was demolished. Mlakovečki lived in Lapšina until his death in 1603, and was succeeded by his son Nikola II Mlakovečki. The castle was later owned by Baron Locatelle, and then by the Marquis de Prye, a Savoyan nobleman who was given most of Međimurje by the king Charles VI of Habsburg.

The castle was located near the banks of the Mura river, on an elevated site, at 179 meters above sea level, which made it easier to defend against the Turkish threat that existed at the time of its construction. The distance from Sveti Martin na Muri was about 2 kilometers to the west. The castle was relatively large, with an indented ground plan, with several defensive towers, and all its roof parts were covered with tiles.

In 1698, the castle passed into the hands of the nobleman Baltazar III Patačić, and with the arrival of the Althann family as the owners of Međimurje, they took over the entire Lapšina estate with the accompanying castle. Before that, Lapšina was devastated in 1708 by the Hungarian army whose commander was Francis II Rákóczi, grandson of Petar Zrinski, earlier proprietor of Međimurje. The castle is mentioned in documents as early as 1768, after which there is no more available information about it for a long time. After the departure of the Althann counts, the castle building fell into disrepair and was ruined to its foundations by the 1930s. The building material was used to build houses for the surrounding population.

== See also ==
- List of castles in Croatia
- House of Zrinski
