= Starigrad Fortress =

15th century fort in Dalmatia, Croatia

Starigrad Fortress (Fortica)
- Tvrđava Starigrad-Fortica
- Omiš; Croatia
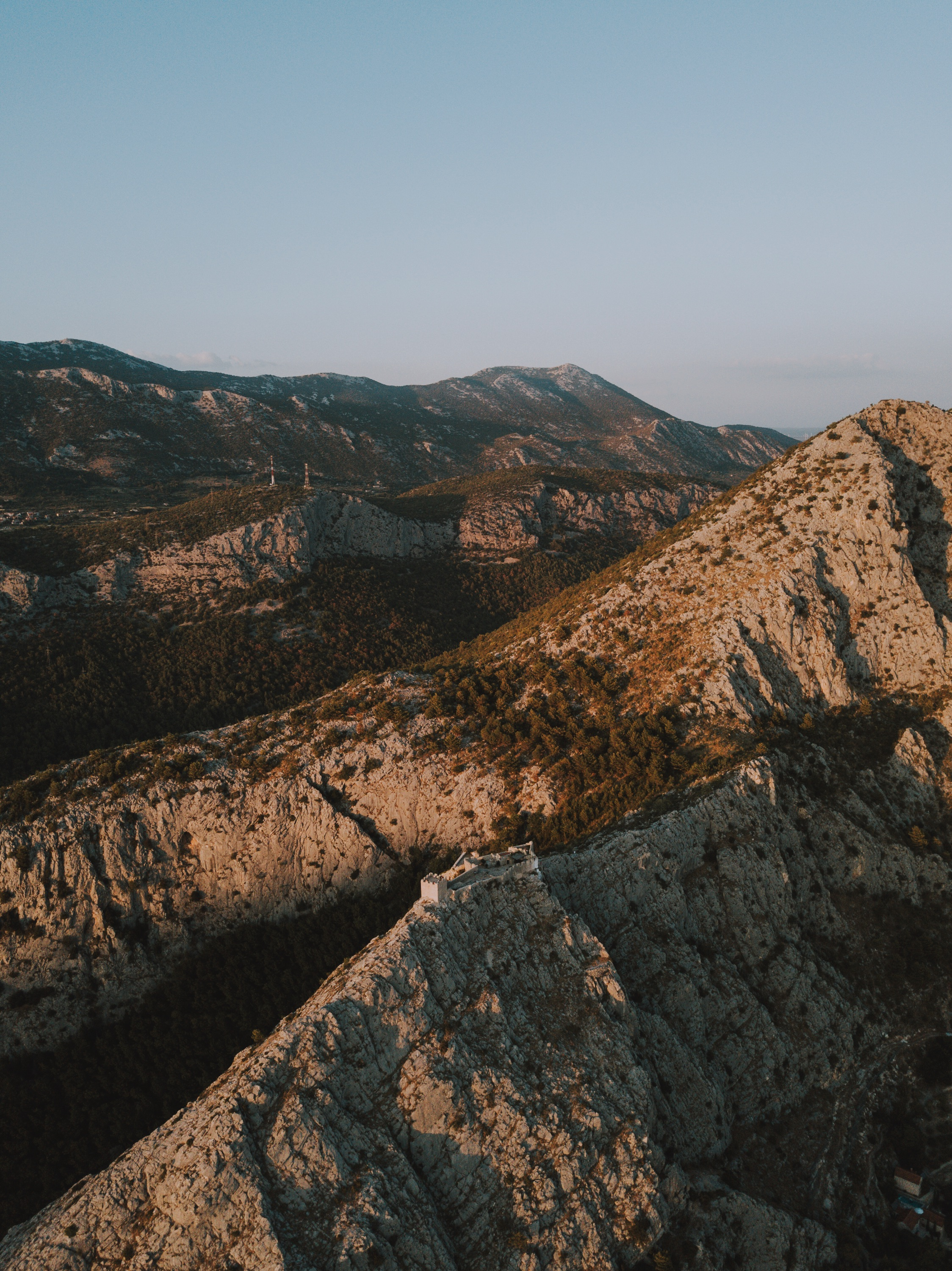
- Starigrad Fortress (Fortica) in Omiš

Location
- Coordinates: 43°26′41″N 16°42′0″E
- Height: about 262 metres (860 ft)

Site history
- Built: 15th century
- Built by: Kingdom of Croatia
- Materials: limestone

Starigrad Fortress is a 15th-century fortress located near Omiš in Split-Dalmatia county, in Dalmatia, Croatia.

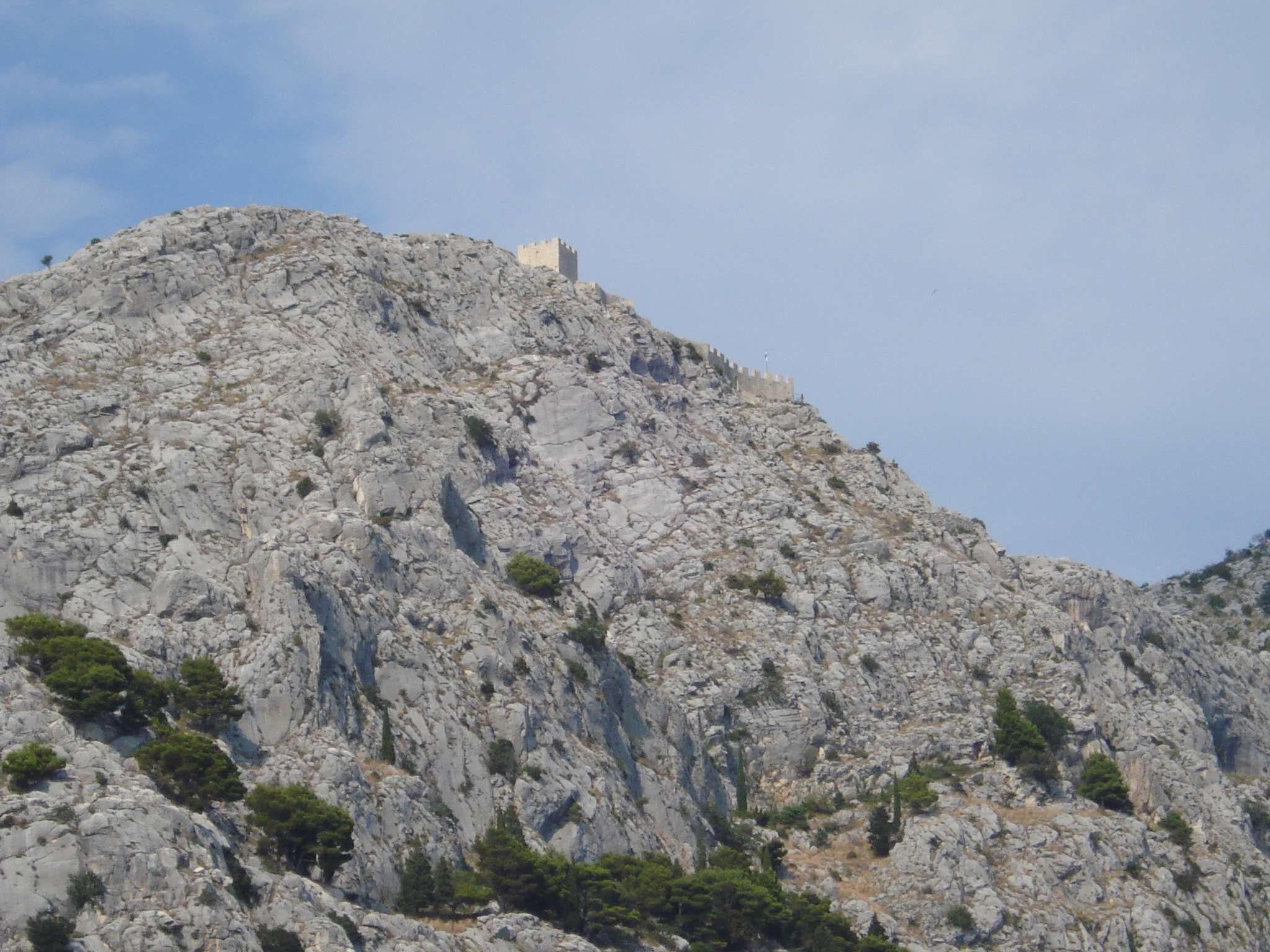
The walls of Starigrad are 262m above sea level.

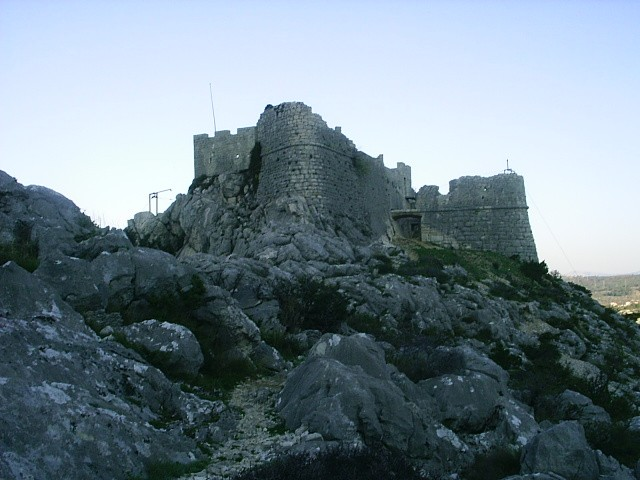
The approach and gateway into Starigrad was protected by a bastion (center) and a barbican (right).

The fortress or Fortica was built during the Croatian–Ottoman wars as a primary defence against the Ottoman Empire. The precipitous fortification is sited on a 262 m (860 ft) ridge above the town Omiš. In the event of attack, its purpose was to provide refuge for local people and be a stronghold where they could retreat to and resist the Turks.

As the stone fort's defensive strength is derived from the elevation at which it was built, it is a rudimentary defensive structure. A two-storey square tower stands at its highest point, serving as both a lookout post and keep. A simple bastion stands at the opposite end of the fort to cover the approach path and the ridge line. It has an outer barbican to defend the fort's narrow entrance gateway and the gorge below the fort. The walls, which are about 1 m (3 ft 3 in) thick, are made from locally quarried limestone. They enclose an inner bailey that is separated into two distinct levels by the difference in the site's natural rock height. Access between the levels is via a small stone stairway that was once protected by a stone wall and gateway. In event of attack, the fortification's design permits the defenders to fall back to higher ground as each level falls.

Eastern views from the fort

At the fort

The fort from the east

== Ascent Routes ==
Nowadays three routes are ascending the fort. Two are normal hiking routes, the third one is an exceptionally beautiful ferata.

Omiš town from the lower part of Via ferrata Fortica

Via ferrata Fortica

Omiš from Via ferrata Fortica

On Via ferrata Fortica

Reaching the fort

== See also ==
- Mirabella Fortress (Peovica)
