= Mirabella Fortress (Peovica) =

13th century fort in Dalmatia, Croatia

Mirabella Fortress Peovica
- Omiš; Croatia
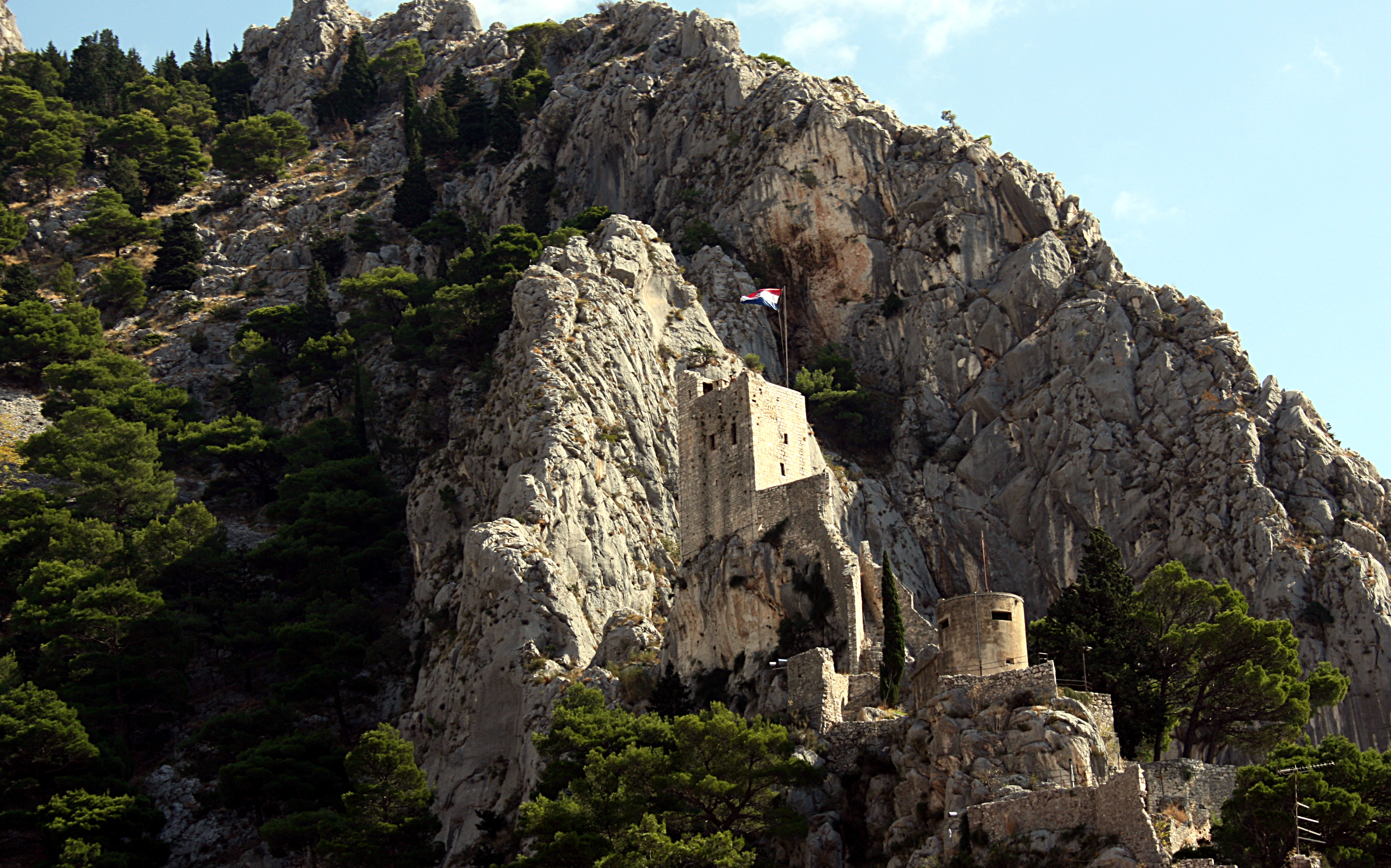
- Mirabella Fortress

Location
- Coordinates: 43°26′41.4″N 16°41′38.4″E

Site history
- Materials: Stone

Mirabella Fortress (Peovica) is a fortress located above town of Omiš in Split-Dalmatia County, in Dalmatia, Croatia.

Mirabella or Peovica is a Romanesque fortress, built in the 13th century above the town of Omiš by the Kačić family. Mirabella was a reliable hideout for the Omiš pirates who used to retreat into the safety of the Cetina gorge. Legend says that in 1537, during an attack by the Turks, the defenders of Omiš confused the attackers with their shouting and shots so much that the Turks overestimated the number of defenders and fled.

== See also ==
- Starigrad Fortress – another fortress near Omiš
