= Cippico Castle =

Castle in Dalmatia, Croatia

- Croatia
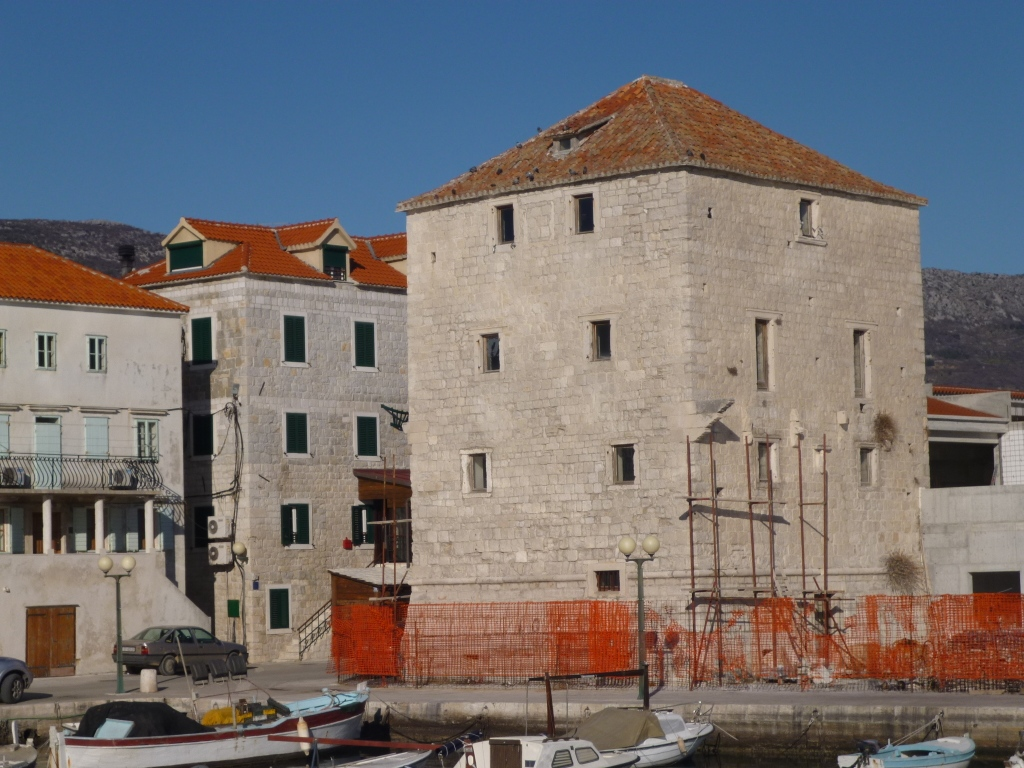
- Cippico Castle

Location
- Location within Croatia
- Coordinates: 43.547432°N 16.338990°E

Cippico Castle is a castle in Kaštel Novi, a town within the administrative area of Kaštela in Dalmatia, Croatia.

== History ==
In 1512, Pavao Antun Cippico, a nobleman from Trogir, built a fortified summer residence with inclined ground-floor walls and an adjoining fortified village for his labourers from the villages below Mount Kozjak. Today, the castle has been restored and serves as a cultural venue in Kaštel Novi. Today, the castle has been restored and serves as a cultural venue in Kaštel Novi, hosting exhibitions and events.
