= Lapšina =

- Village
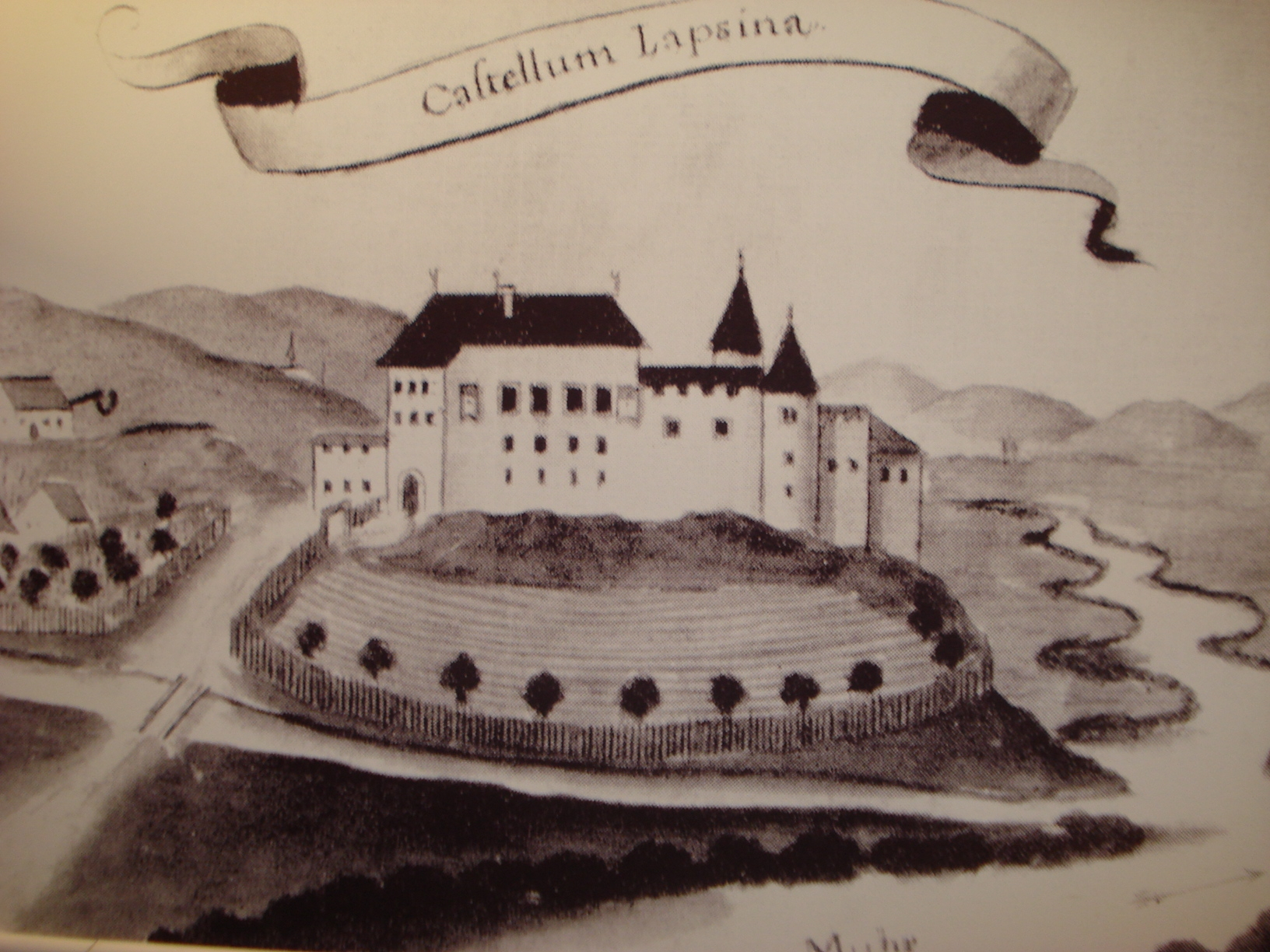
- Lapsina Castle

- Location within Croatia
- Coordinates: 46°31′19″N 16°20′13″E
- Country: Croatia
- County: Međimurje County
- Municipality: Sveti Martin na Muri

Area
  - Total: 0.7 km^{2} (0.27 sq mi)

Population (2021)
  - Total: 130
  - Density: 190/km^{2} (480/sq mi)
- Time zone: UTC+1 (CET)
  - Summer (DST): UTC+2 (CEST)
- Postal code: 40313 Sveti Martin na Muri

Lapšina is a village in northern Croatia, part of the Sveti Martin na Muri municipality within Međimurje County.

== History ==
Lapšina is mentioned in charter issued in year 1478 as Lapsthin. In the late 16th century, the nobleman Nikola I Mlakovečki (Nicolaus Malakoczy) built a castle in Lapšina. The castle fell into disrepair during 19th century and by the 1930s it was completely demolished.

== Geography ==
Lapšina is located in part of Međimurje called Gornje Međimurje. Lapšina is about 21 kilometres northwest from Čakovec. Village is situated on the right bank of river Mur near border with Slovenia. Lapšina had a population of 148 in 2011 census. Lapšina is experiencing population decline since 2000s.

Historical population

Year	Pop.	±%
1921	53	—
1931	157	+196.2%
1948	255	+62.4%
1953	254	−0.4%
1961	248	−2.4%

Year	Pop.	±%
1971	232	−6.5%
1981	211	−9.1%
1991	216	+2.4%
2001	182	−15.7%
2011	148	−18.7%
