= Cippico (surname) =

Cippico is a Dalmatian Italian surname. Notable people with the name include:

- Alvise Cippico (1456 – 1504), Roman Catholic prelate who served as Archbishop of Zadar and Bishop of Famagusta
- Antonio Cippico (1877 –1935), Dalmatian Italian politician, translator, and irredentist
- Coriolano Cippico (1425–1493), Dalmatian nobleman, landowner, civil servant, humanist and military commander
- Edoardo Prettner Cippico (1905 – 1983), Italian Catholic priest and official in the Vatican Secret Archive

== See also ==
- Ivo Ćipiko (1869–1923), writer from Kaštela, descendant of the same noble family
- Cippico
