= Cambi castle =

Castle in Dalmatia, Croatia

Coordinates: 43.55°N 16.383°E

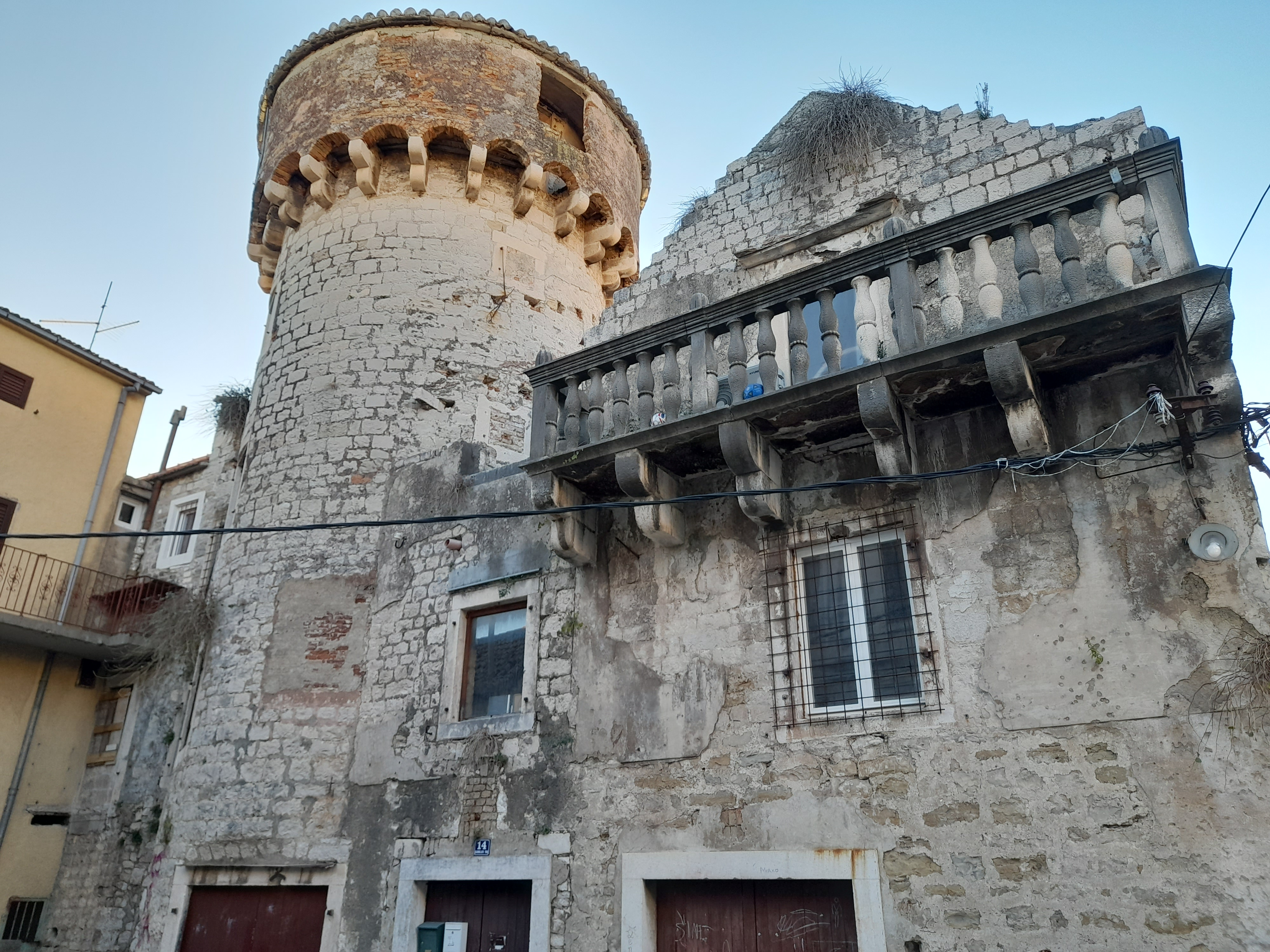
Cambi castle

Cambi Castle is castle in Kaštel Kambelovac, a town within the administrative area of Kaštela in Dalmatia, Croatia.

== History ==
Cambi Castle was built by the aristo-cratic family Cambi from Split (1589). In 1517 brothers Jerolim and Nikola Cambi, built a castle on an islet to protect themselves and residents of Lažan and Kruševik settlements. The castle was cylindrically shaped (only one in Kaštela), making it easily defensible. The citadel was surrounded by the sea but was later connected with the mainland by filling up and levelling. A village gate also survived in its vicinity.
