= Kaštilac =

- Kaštel Gomilica; Croatia
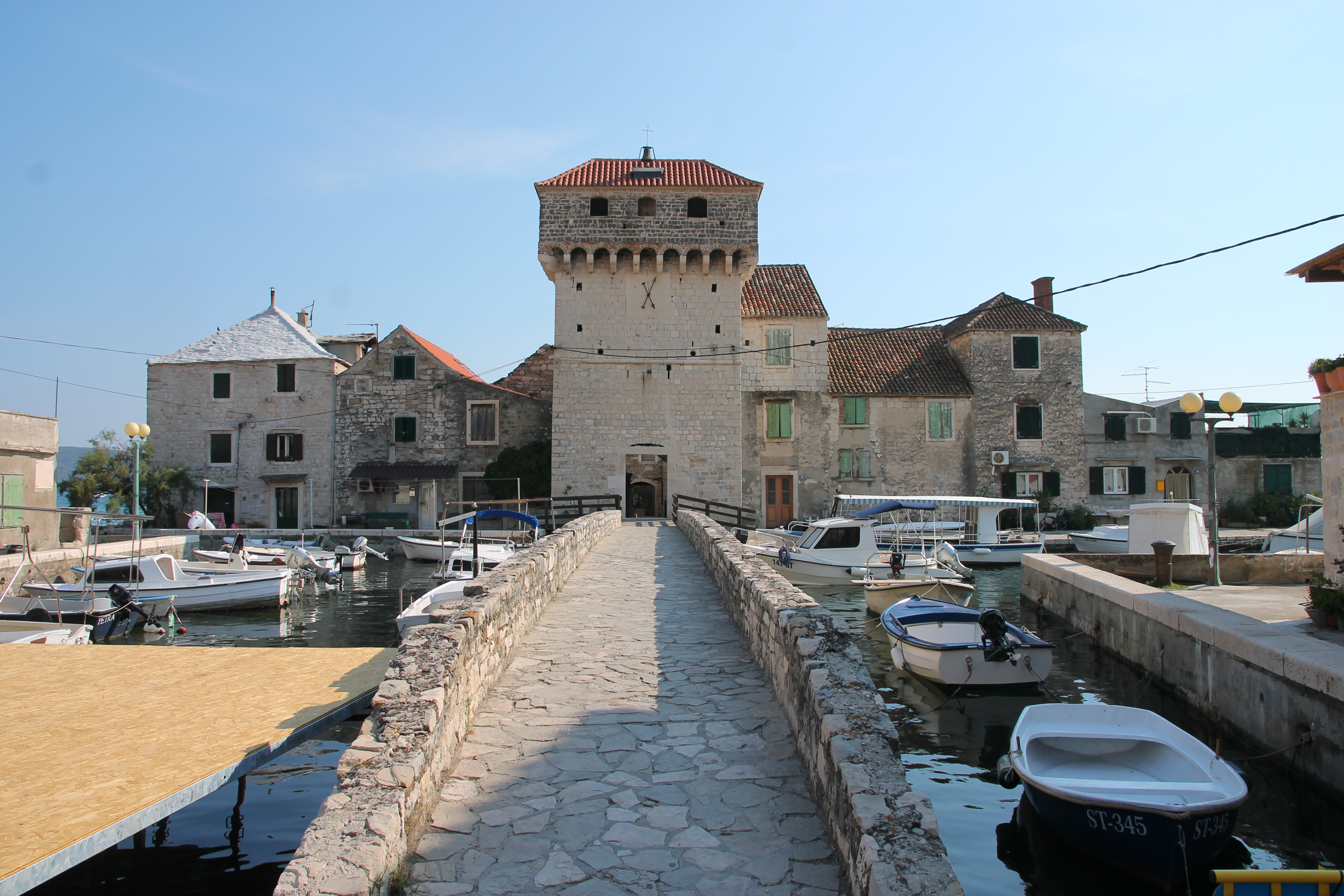
- Entrance to Kaštilac (from the north side)

Site information
- Type: Fortification, mixed
- Open to the public: Yes

Location
- Coordinates: 43.547239°N 16.395369°E

Site history
- Built: 1545
- Built by: Benedictine nuns
- Materials: Limestone

Kaštilac was a fortress of a Benedictine Monastery located by the Adriatic Sea in central Dalmatia, and is now a settlement in Kaštel Gomilica, located in the central part of Split-Dalmatia county, Croatia. Kaštilac is the only castle of seven castles in Kaštela.

== History ==
King Zvonimir of Croatia of the Svetoslavić branch of the House of Trpimirović, had donated to a Benedictine from Split possession in the Kaštela field (Kaštelansko polje) in 1078. In the 12th century Benedictine built a church of St. Cosmas and Damian in the Romanesque Architecture style.

Due to the Turkish threat, Benedictine nuns completed the construction of a fortified settlement Kaštilac on the islet of Gomilica in 1545. Entrance to the castle is protected by high tower over the stone bridge with arches. Kaštilac is 40 metres (130 ft) away from the shore, connected with the stone bridge, which was made only of stone. Fortress has square floor plan and in the past, at the entrance was located drawbridge. After the fortress was completed, within the fortification walls arrived inhabitants of the Upper and Lower Kozica, after the Turks had devastated their former villages. In the 17th century the tower lost its defensive function.

== See also ==
- Kaštel Gomilica
- Kaštela
- Order of Saint Benedict
