= Kaštel Gomilica =

- Settlement
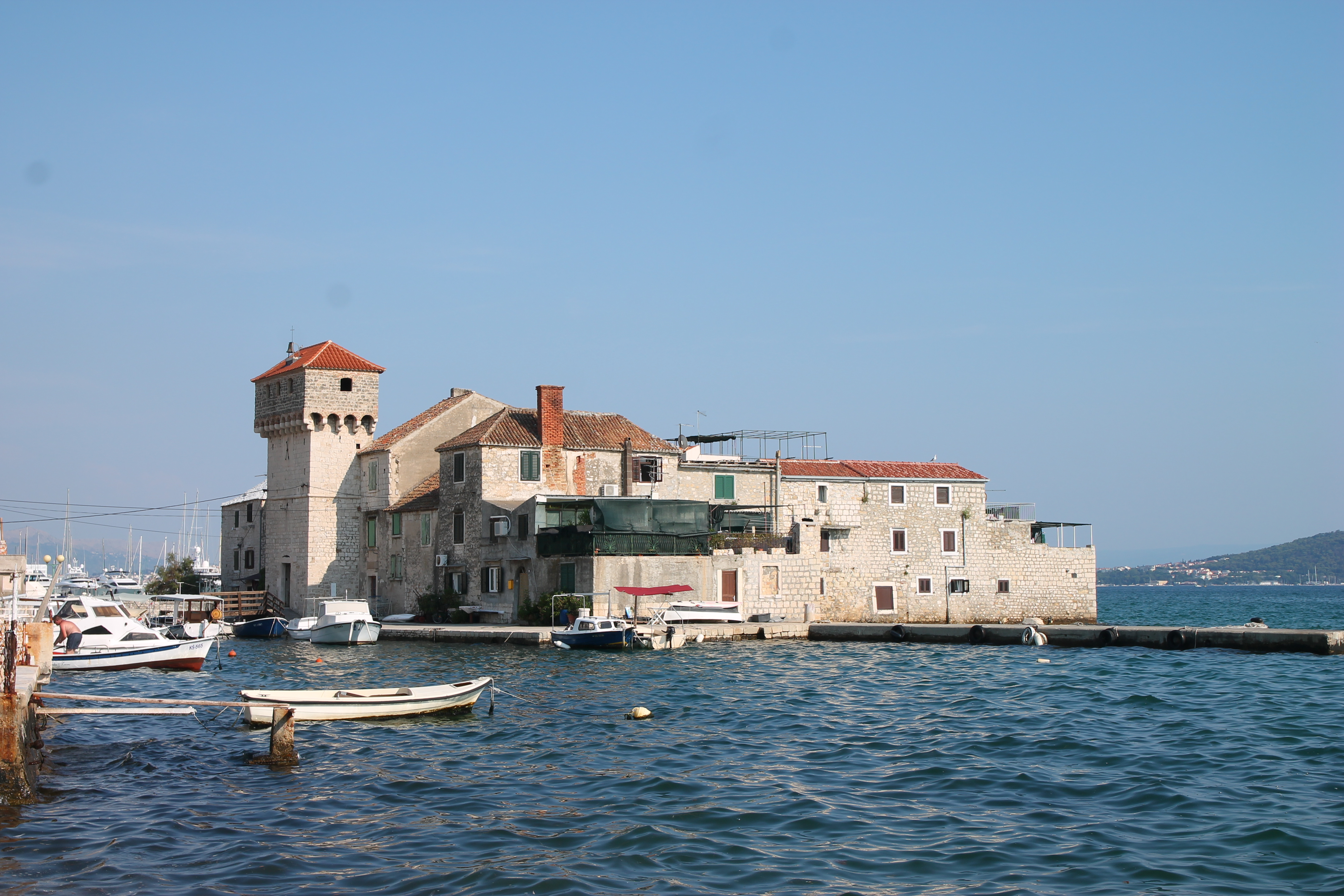

- Location within Croatia
- Coordinates: 43°33′N 16°24′E
- Country: Croatia
- County: Split-Dalmatia
- City: Kaštela

Area
  - Total: 2.5 km^{2} (0.97 sq mi)

Population (2021)
  - Total: 4,699
  - Density: 1,900/km^{2} (4,900/sq mi)
- Time zone: UTC+1 (CET)
  - Summer (DST): UTC+2 (CEST)

Kaštel Gomilica is a settlement within the town of Kaštela in Dalmatia, Croatia.

== History ==
Kaštel Gomilica was built in the first half of the 16th century by the Benedictine nuns from Split. The nuns built it on the estate (Pustica) which they received as a donation from King Zvonimir of Croatia in 1078. They also built the Romanesque Church of St. Cosmas and Damian in 1160, and erected a Catholic monastery on a small island known today Kaštilac. Kaštel Gomilica was used as one of the shooting locations in the HBO series Game of Thrones where it was used as a backdrop for the Free City of Braavos.

== Sport ==
The town is home of NK GOŠK Kaštel Gomilica, an association football team previously called Jugovinil.
