= Pejačević Castle in Osijek =

Manor house in Osijek, Croatia

Pejačević Castle
- Dvorac Pejačević
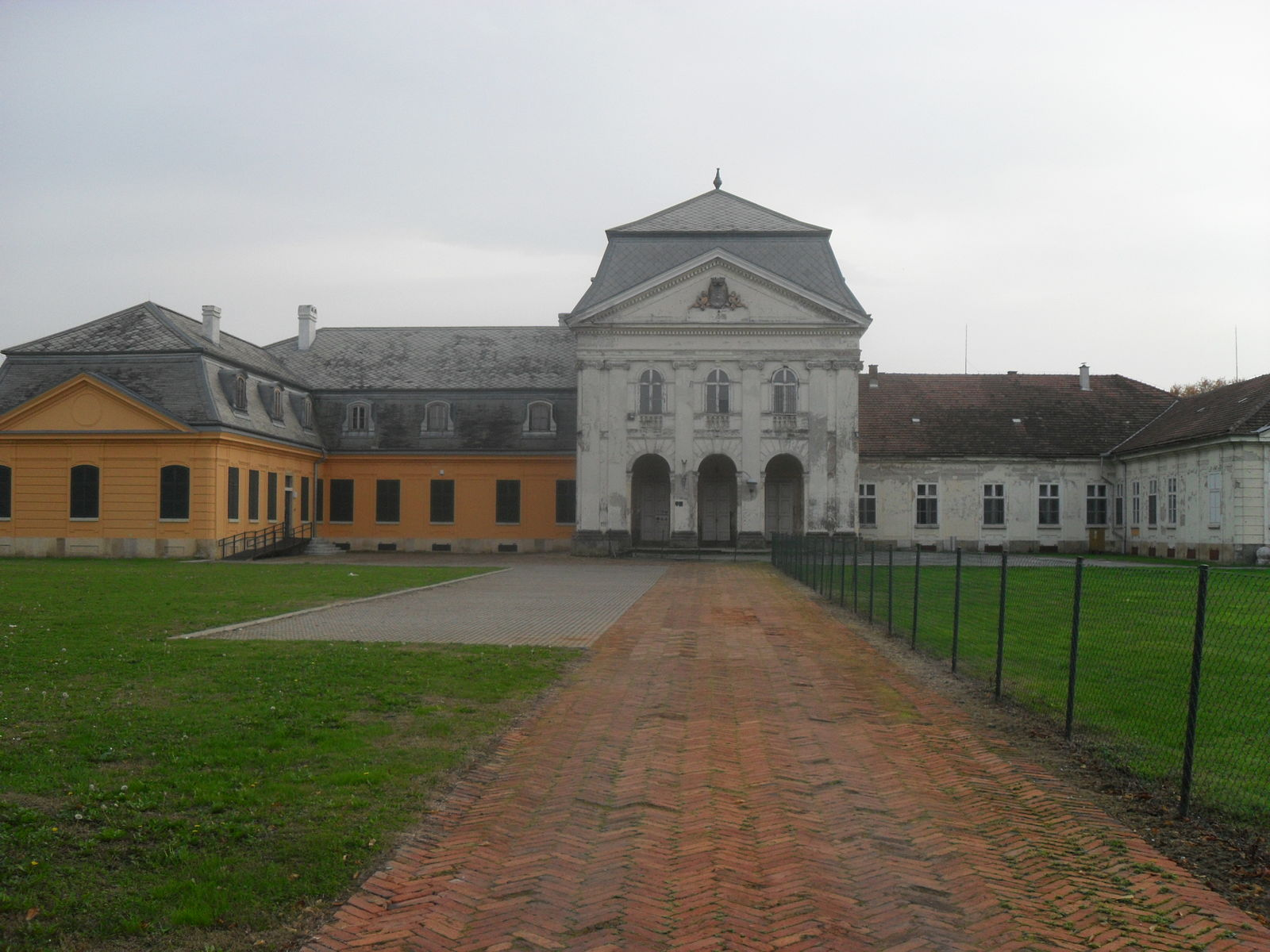

General information
- Architectural style: Classical
- Location: Retfala, Osijek, Croatia, 141 Josip Juraj Strossmayer Street
- Coordinates: 45°33′46.5″N 18°39′36.5″E
- Construction started: 1796 (probably)
- Completed: 1801
- Opened: 1801; 225 years ago

Pejačević Castle (Croatian: Dvorac Pejačević) is a classical manor located in the Retfala district in the city of Osijek. It is one of several country houses owned by the members of the Pejačević noble family in the region of Slavonia.

== History ==
According to the sign located on the facade above the entrance, the manor was built by count Sigismund Pejačević in 1801, with the actual construction beginning somewhere around 1796.

The Retfala estate was acquired by the Pejačević Counts as a grant by the then Austrian empress and Croatian-Hungarian Queen Maria Theresa in 1750. In the beginning it started out as a relatively small estate.

== Architecture ==
The refined classical manor is composed of three wings shaped in the form of the letter U. The internal space is organised around a central hallway with rooms aligned on either side. The central axis is highlighted by the grand hall and atrium within the great pavilion.

The central pavilion is raised on the first floor, whilst the remaining part of the manor, complete with its lateral wings, is at ground level.

At ground level, the pavilion is articulated by arcades and a great series of ionic pilasters, which was originally covered by a mansard roof, as was the remainder of the building. The manor is separated from the street by a triumphal entrance made from wrought iron railings. Despite the identity of the architect not being known, the manor is regarded as a significant work of classical architecture within Croatia.

== Mausoleum ==
The Pejačević Family chapel-mausoleum which dates from the year 1891, is located at the Retfala Cemetery in the vicinity of the manor.

== Today ==
Previously set amongst a large pleasure garden, the manor is now in a neglected and decrepit state. Once a part of the pleasure garden which stretched all around the manor, the mausoleum set within the contemporary Retfala Cemetery shares the same fate. In the center there is a Medical Center.
