= Juraj V Zrinski =

Croatian Ban (viceroy)

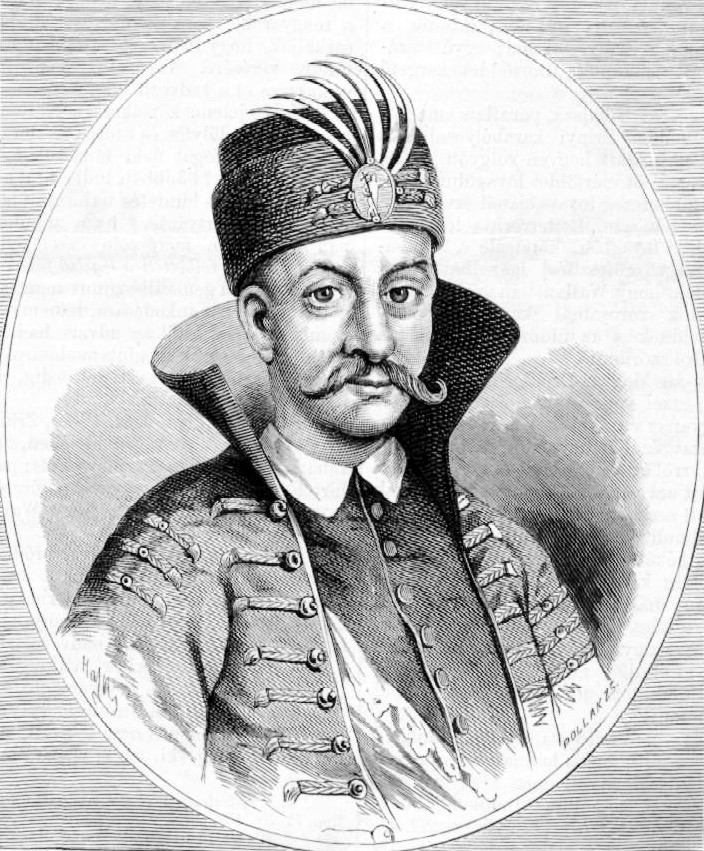

Ban of Croatia
- In office 15 November 1622 – 28 December 1626
- Preceded by: Nikola Frankopan of Tržac
- Succeeded by: Zsigmond Erdődy

Personal details
- Born: 31 January 1599 Csáktornya Kingdom of Hungary, (today Čakovec, Croatia)
- Died: 28 December 1626 (aged 27) Pozsony, Kingdom of Hungary (today Bratislava, Slovakia)
- Resting place: Pauline monastery in Sveta Jelena, Croatia
- Spouse: Magdalena née Széchy
- Children: Nikola Zrinski; Petar Zrinski
- Parent(s): Juraj IV Zrinski; Sofija Zrinski

Juraj V Zrinski (Hungarian: V. Zrínyi György; 31 January 1599 – 28 December 1626) was a Croatian Ban (viceroy), warrior and member of the Zrinski noble family.

== Biography ==
Juraj V Zrinski was born in Csáktornya Kingdom of Hungary (today Čakovec, a town in the Međimurje County, the northernmost county of Croatia). He was the grandson of one of the greatest Croatian Ban, Nikola IV Zrinski, who died in the tragic and heroic Siege of Szigetvár (Croatian: Sigetska bitka), at a town in the western Hungary where the Ottoman invasion to Vienna had been stopped.

He was the son of Count Juraj IV Zrinski, Master of the treasury in the Kingdom of Hungary and Croatia, and Countess Sofija Zrinski née Stubenberg. Educated in Protestantism, he later turned to Catholicism and "purified" his estates from Lutheranism.

On 15 November 1622 Zrinski was appointed Ban of Croatia. At that time, he was widely recognized as a brave and courageous warrior. He fought the Turks in many battles.

His wife Magdalena née Széchy bore him two children: Nikola Zrinski and Petar Zrinski, who both later became distinguished Croatian bans and died a violent death.

Juraj Zrinski died in a military camp near Pressburg, during the Thirty Years' War. His chivalry and rapier-tonguedness were, unfortunately, a thorn in his superior's, general Albrecht von Wallenstein's, side and von Wallenstein had Zrinski poisoned after a verbal duel in 1626. At age 27 the ban was buried in Pauline monastery of Sveta Jelena (St. Helen in English) near Čakovec, next to the graves of his ancestors.
