= Ivo Ćipiko =

Writer from Croatia and Serbia (1869–1923)

Ivo Ćipiko Иво Ћипико
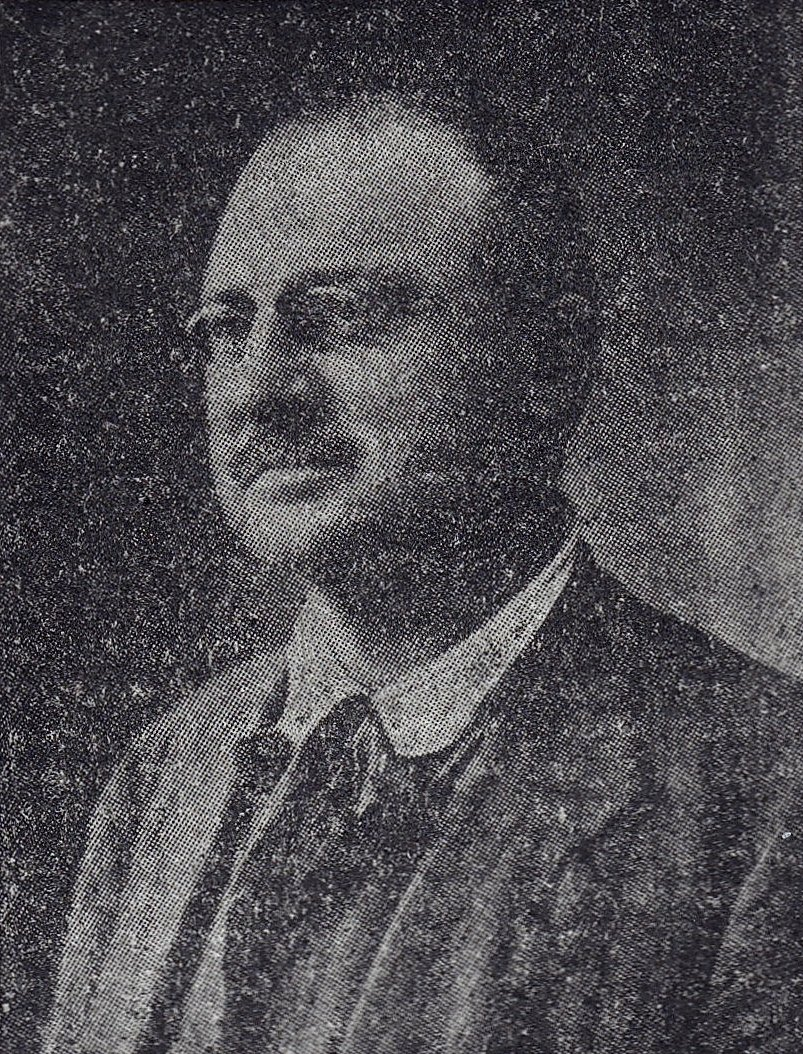
- Born: 13 January 1869; Kaštel Novi, Kingdom of Dalmatia, Austria-Hungary
- Died: 23 September 1923 (aged 54); Kaštel Novi, Kingdom of Serbs, Croats, and Slovenes
- Writing career
- Language: Serbo-Croatian

Ivo Ćipiko (Serbian Cyrillic: Иво Ћипико; 13 January 1869 – 23 September 1923) was a short story writer and novelist who worked in Croatia and Serbia.

== Biography ==
Ivo Ćipiko was born on 13 January 1869 in Kaštel Novi, on the estate of his forefathers who came from Italy in the Middle Ages and settled along the Dalmatian coast. Early in his education he came under the influence of Serbian literature, then popularized by the Serb-Catholic circle.

While attending the Franciscan gymnasium in Sinj, he came into conflict with school authorities and ran away to Split. Having completed gymnasium there, he traveled in Bosnia and started writing. In 1887 Ćipiko received a scholarship for the school of forestry in Križevci, from which he graduated in 1890. He worked as a forestry officer in Brač, Makarska, Kotor and Hvar until 1905. He then moved to Knin and Vrlika. In 1911, he visited the International Exhibition of Art in Rome together with Ivan Meštrović, after which he spent some time in Kaštela and then moved to Serbia to become a correspondent for a Sarajevo newspaper. During the First Balkan War of 1912–13 he was a military correspondent attached to the Serbian Army Headquarters.

During the Second Balkan War he was in Sarajevo, after which he moved back to Belgrade. In 1914, he received the status of a Serbian citizen, which resulted in the authorities of Austria-Hungary declaring him a traitor. During World War I, he followed the Serbian army to Greece, then moved to France for a while, and back to Greece. He recorded a number of significant war diaries during this time.

After the war, when Yugoslavia was formed, he worked as a forestry inspector in Belgrade, and became acquainted with regent Aleksandar I Karađorđević.

Ćipiko returned to his family estate in Kaštel Novi in the summer of 1923, where he died on 23 September 1923.

== Works ==
He published some early works in Mostar literary newspapers in 1885 and 1886, but in general he became active after his posting at Nerežišća on Brač. He would publish a significant amount in the period until his posting fifteen years later in Vrlika. Inspired by Serbian realist prose about country life, in 1897 he published his first short story Pogibe k’o od šale in the magazine Novi viek by Ante Tresić Pavičić. The first part of this novel Za kruhom was published in the magazine Nada under Silvije Strahimir Kranjčević. The story collection Sa ostrva published in Belgrade confirmed his status as a prose writer.

Serbian fiction of the time, denoted as lyrical realism by literary critic Jovan Skerlić, relied upon the previous tradition, but it also cleared the way for later modern fiction. The sense of alarm concerning the deterioration of social conditions present in one of Ćipiko's notable works, the 1909 novel Pauci (The Spiders), had a lot to do with it. Pauci was written at a time when he lived in Vrlika, and the first part of was published in the Croatian Writers' Association magazine Savremenik in 1908, and as a complete work a year later by the Serbian Literary Guild.

In his short-story collections, such as "Seaside Souls" (1899) and "By the Sea" (1911), the novel "For Bread" (1904), and the drama "On the Border" (1910), Ćipiko depicted the life of Dalmatian peasants and their struggles with moneylenders, landowners, and Austrian bureaucrats. He introduced the figure of the peasant rebel into Serbian literature in the novel "Spiders" (1909). His search for moral ideals was expressed in his poetization of the "natural man," who opposed the values of bourgeois society. He used realist narrative techniques but playfully embellished them by focusing mainly on the protagonist's inner life. Ćipiko's notes and diaries from the front, "Impressions of the War of 1912" (1914) and "From the Days of War" (1917), are marked by a spirit of antimilitarism.

Ćipiko, like Simo Matavulj before him, presented a picture of the South Adriatic that was not always sunny or blue.

Ivo has "poems in prose" in which the narrative element is totally subordinated to lyricism, the evolution of mood, the expression of emotions and passions, and to language and style in Ceznja (Longing, 1898). The same kind of lyrical prose was produced by the eight years younger Isidora Sekulić in Bure (Gusts).

== Legacy ==
Ćipiko is recognized for his contributions to Croatian literature through his themes and language, and Serbian literature through his self-identification and work in public life. His works were also translated to Italian in 1958.

== Bibliography ==
- Iz ratnih dana, Corfu, 1917.
- Iz solunskih borbi, Belgrade, 1919.
- Kraj mora (short stories), Dubrovnik, 1911.
- Na granici, (drama), 1910.
- Na pomolu, Thessaloniki, 1916.
- Na povratku s rada, (short stories)
- Pauci (novel), Belgrade, 1909.
- Preljub (short stories), Belgrade, 1914.
- Primorske duše (short stories), Zagreb, 1899.
- Sa jadranskih obala (short stories), Mostar, 1900.
- Sa ostrva (short stories), Belgrade, 1903.
- Utisci iz rata 1912, Sarajevo, 1914.
- Volja naroda (drama), 1911.
- Za kruhom (novel), Novi Sad, 1904.

== Sources ==
- Novaković, Boško (1971). Milisavac, Živan (ed.). Jugoslovenski književni leksikon [Yugoslav Literary Lexicon] (in Serbo-Croatian). Novi Sad (SAP Vojvodina, SR Serbia): Matica srpska. p. 73.
- Brešić, Vinko (1993). "ĆIPIKO, Ivo". Croatian Biographical Lexicon (in Croatian).
