= Suor Prudenza Cambi =

Suor Prudenza Fiammetta Cambi (died 1601) was a Florentine nun and artist during the sixteenth century at Santa Caterina da Siena in Florence, Italy. She has been identified as one of Plautilla Nelli’s artistic ‘disciples.’

== Early life and background ==
Prudenza Cambi came from a wealthy and noble family from the Florentine Drago neighborhood in the San Giovanni Quarter. She was the daughter of Filippo di Francesco Cambi and Maria di Francesco della Fonte. Her grandfather, Francesco di Guido Cambi, signed a petition in 1497 supporting Savonarola. Francesco di Guido Cambi held political office as a member of the Buonomini in 1501 and the Priori in 1504. Like her great-aunt, Suor Filippa di Bartolomeo Corsini, Prudenza entered the convent of Santa Caterina da Siena.

== Religious Life and Art ==
Historian Catherine Turrill suspects that while Plautilla Nelli was prioress, Prudenza Cambi may have assisted her with her paintings in the 1560s. She may have also overseen the projects of the other artists. To date there is no work attributed to her.

== Later life and death ==
Prudenza Cambi was elected prioress in both 1587 and 1593. She died in 1601.
