= Juraj IV Zrinski =

Juraj IV Zrinski Zrínyi IV. György
- Count
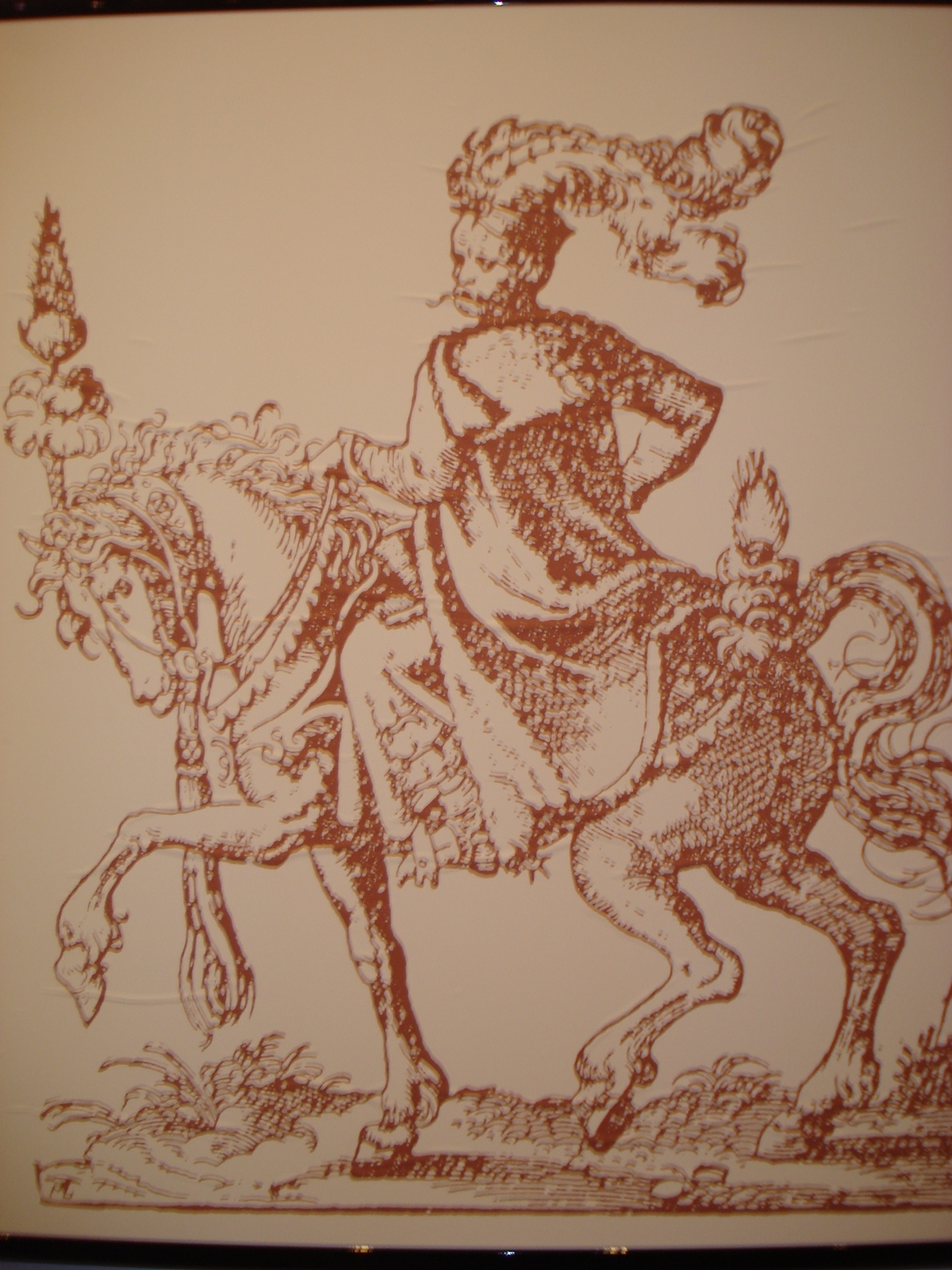
- Juraj IV Zrinski (1549–1603)
- Born: 13 April 1549
- Died: 4 May 1603 (aged 54); Vép near Szombathely, Kingdom of Hungary, Habsburg monarchy
- House: House of Zrinski
- Father: Nikola IV Zrinski
- Mother: Katarina Zrinski (born Frankopan)

Juraj IV Zrinski (Hungarian: Zrínyi IV. György) (Čakovec, 13 April 1549 – Vép by Szombathely, 4 May 1603) was a Croatian count, a member of the Zrinski noble family, and royal Master of the treasury from 1567 until his death in 1603.

== Life ==
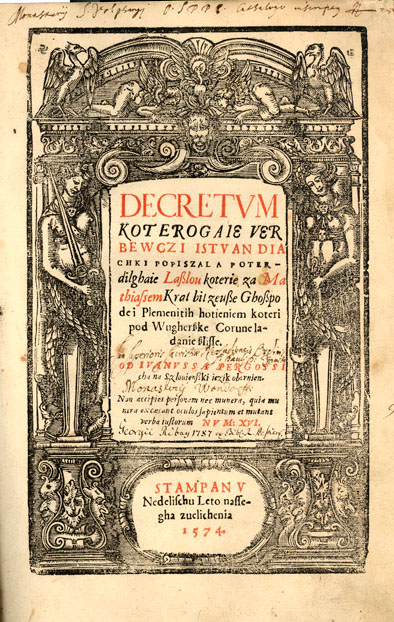
Front page of Decretum tripartitum Juraj Zrinski had 1574 in Nedelišće printed

He was the son of Croatian Ban (viceroy) Nikola IV Zrinski (*1508 - †1566.), the hero of Szigetvar, and his wife Katarina Zrinski née Frankopan (married 1543, died 1561), a Croatian countess.

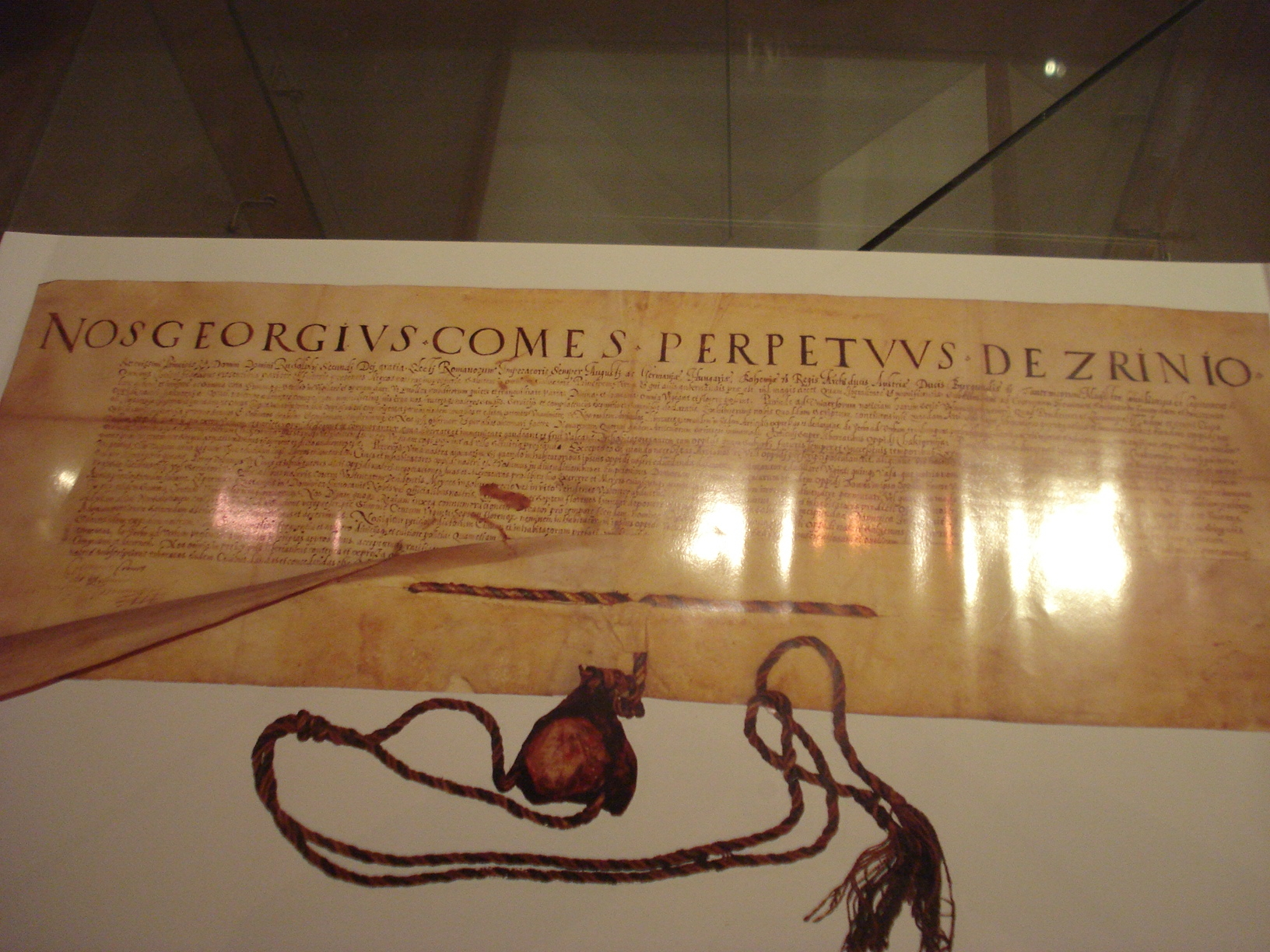
Čakovec Charter of Privileges of count Juraj IV Zrinski from 1579

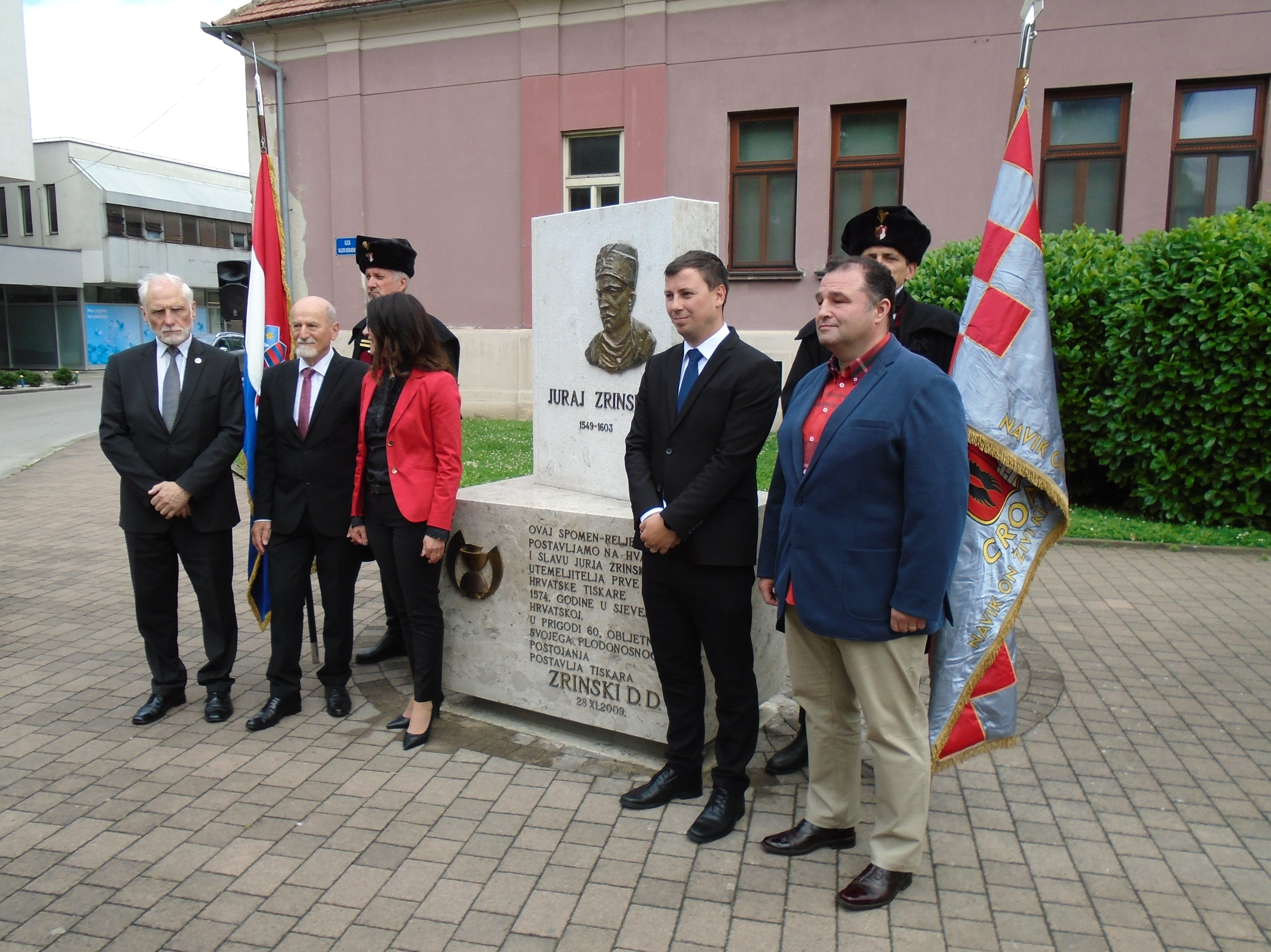
Juraj IV Zrinski monument in Čakovec

From his father he inherited a large number of estates in Muraköz, Hungary, with the large and strongly fortified Csáktornya castle. He succeeded his father at the royal position of the Master of the treasury in the Kingdom of Hungary and Croatia, which held until his death.

In the time of growing and spreading Protestantism, Zrinski accepted it and adducted the Lutheran pastors to replace the Catholic priests in Croatian parishes, which caused indignation and revolt of the people. He was a friend of Nikola I. Mlakovečki, one of the leading Protestant nobles in Croatia.

On the other hand, his contribution was the introduction of book printing into northern Croatia. In the early 1570s he invited an Austrian printer and grafic expert named Rudolf Hoffhalter to found a printing office in Nedelišće, a village next to Čakovec. Many publications were printed there in the next couple of years (probably until 1586), among which was the famous juristic book Decretum tripartitum of the publisher Ivanuš Pergošić, the first book ever in Croatian Kajkavian dialect, printed in 1574.

Like his ancestors and descendants, Zrinski took part in battles against the Ottomans, who conquered most of Croatia, and he often carried out the sudden attacks to the hinterland of the enemy in order to slow down or stop them from further conquests.

On 29 May 1579 he granted privileges to the inhabitants of the Čakovec fortress and its suburbs. This was the starting point for Čakovec to become a free market town and the date is celebrated today as Čakovec City Day.

Juraj IV Zrinski was married twice with ladies from Arco family of Tyrol and Stubenberg family of Styria, with whom he had four children. His sons Nikola VI and Juraj V (future Croatian Ban) succeeded him when he died in 1603. He was buried in Pauline monastery of Sveta Jelena (St. Helen) near Čakovec, next to the grave where the head of his famous father had been buried 37 years before.

== See also ==
- Skrad castle
- House of Mlakovečki

Juraj IV Zrinski House of Zrinski Born: 13 April 1549 Died: 4 May 1603
Political offices
Preceded by Nikola IV Zrinski	Master of the treasury 1567–1603	Succeeded by Tamás Erdődy
