= Split Suburban Railway =

Suburban railway network in Split, Croatia

Split Metro
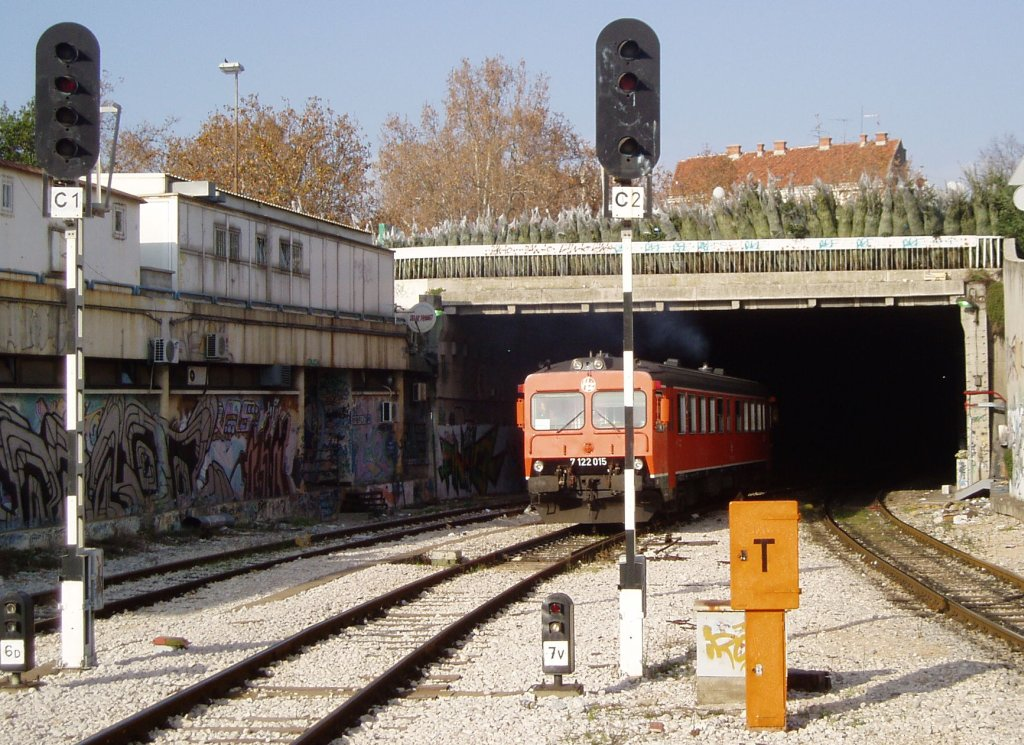
- The railway uses Swedish-made Y1 units

Overview
- Owner: Croatian Railways
- Termini: Split-Harbour; Kaštel Stari
- Stations: 7

Service
- Type: Suburban railway
- Operator: HŽ Putnički prijevoz
- Rolling stock: HŽ 7122 series

History
- Opened: February 1993; December 10, 2006

Technical
- Line length: 17.8 km
- Number of tracks: 1 (2)
- Track gauge: 1,435 mm (4 ft 8 1/2 in)
- Electrification: To be electrified in the future

The Split Metro (Croatian: Splitski metro) is a suburban railway service in Split, Croatia. The service has been operating on the refurbished existing M604 line since December 10, 2006. It serves seven stations, running from Split centre to Kaštel Stari. Between June 2019 and November 2019 additional services operated between Split and Split-Kopilica.

As of 2019, it is planned that new stations will be added along the tracks and the existing stops renovated. The line runs through two tunnels within the city centre of Split; within the longer of the two tunnels a metro-like station (Split-H.B.Z.) will be opened in 2021 to serve the city centre. The line is 17.8 kilometres (11.1 mi) long while an average train ride lasts for 25 minutes. A link with Split Airport (in 2025) and further extension to Trogir is considered, with possible electrification in the long-term.

== History ==
Most of the railway lines were completed in October 1877, as Split was connected to Siverić via Perković. When Split hosted the 1979 Mediterranean Games, an extensive suburban railway system was planned. The existing tracks from the suburbs to the main terminus train station in the harbor were laid underground. As a double-track electrified railway was planned, an underground station Split-H.B.Z. (with a 1,893 m tunnel) was built. A further section of the railway was covered in 1983.

In 1991, the Croatian war of independence broke out. The occupied territory severed the railway links between Split (and Dalmatia) and the rest of Croatia. Between February 1993 and October 1994, Croatian Railways, facing many idle trains and railway workers in Dalmatia, organized a short-lived and ill-fated Split suburban railway from Split to Kaštela. Local authorities did not support the project while the long-distance rolling stock proved to be unsuitable for suburban traffic. After the war's end in 1995 this project was abandoned.

In December 2006, Croatian Railways reopened the line for suburban traffic, announcing plans to electrify the line and lay a second set of tracks, which still has not happened. Since 2007, CR has intended to refurbish and re-equip the Split railway tunnel and open the underground station Split-H.B.Z., and a contract was signed between CR and Split authorities, but in late 2015 the City of Split definitely withdrew from the project citing the lack of funds as the main reason. In 2011, HŽ Putnički prijevoz, the successor of the Croatian Railways' passenger transport division, struck off one third or 7 daily departures from its timetable, amidst heavy protests and criticism.

== Current state ==
The major issues plaguing the line include the distance of the railway tracks (built for long-distance traffic towards Knin and Zagreb) from the population centers along Bay of Kaštela. Despite the fact that around 35% of Split, 40% of Solin, and 50% of Kastela population lives along the suburban railway, due to the urban sprawl and the lack of spatial planning the surrounding area mostly consists of single-family detached homes with low urban density and poor access to public transport. Together with the lack of railway commuting tradition among the population, this maintains the reliance on personal vehicles for transport. In 2007, the suburban railway served just 57,078 passengers and collected 441,690 HRK in fares. In 2010, railway served 111,000 passengers. Town of Kaštela 2016-20 traffic strategy called for a better integration of the suburban railway with the public transport, citing poor state of railway infrastructure, its outdatedness, and low quality and safety of suburban rail traffic.

Split Predgrađe – Split line sold just 635 tickets from its operation start in early June till June 30, 2019.

=== Safety ===
Since the tracks pass very closely through the suburban area without fences, and the car crossings are frequent, there have been a number of accidents. In 2001, a train killed a 19-year-old who was crossing the railway on two-wheel tractor; in 2006 a passenger train killed a man crossing the tracks in his car in Kaštel Sućurac, In December 2008, train collided with a car, injuring 5 in Kaštel Sućurac; while in a separate incident cargo train collided with a car, killing one and injuring another in Kaštel Lukšić; in February 2009 a man was killed in a collision with a train in Kaštel Gomilica; in April 2010, local train killed a man in Dujmovača tunnel, while in November 2012 a 6-year-old girl was killed by a cargo train in Kaštel Gomilica; in May 2013 in Kaštel Štafilić a man was hit by train and both of his legs were amputated; in January 2015 a long-distance train killed a woman in Kaštel Gomilica, in February 2016 passenger train hit a wild boar near Sadine, in December 2016 man died in hospital from injuries sustained on a railway in Kaštel Sućurac, in March 2017 in Kaštel Lukšić train collided with a car, which happened twice in April 2017, in Sadine and in Kaštel Gomilica, respectively; in July 2017 a man was hit and killed by a passenger train in Kaštel Kambelovac. In October 2018 a train collided with a horse in Kaštel Lukšić. In December 2019, Kastela-Split line train derailed, in January 2020 a man was injured when train collided with his car in Sućurac, while in February 2020 a cargo train collided with a car, injuring 2 in Kastel Luksic. In November 2020 a motorcycle driver was severely injured by a train in Kastel Luksic. On February 28th, 2026, a 17-year-old boy died from injuries sustained when he was hit by a train in a tunnel at the main railway station.

=== Operations ===
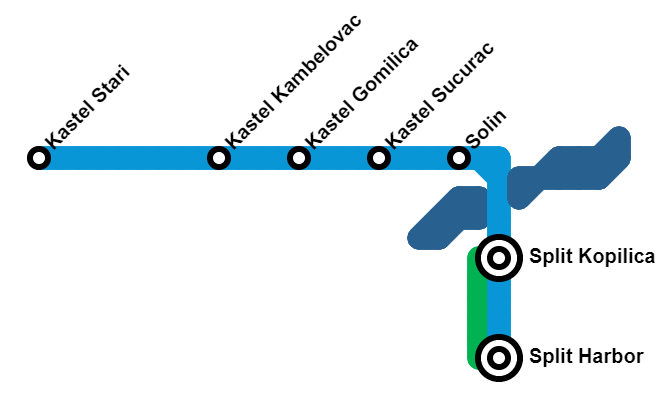
Suburban rail network map in June 2019

==== Kastel Stari – Split ====
The Kaštel Stari–Split route is served by 17 trains daily in each direction on the weekdays and 8 trains during the weekend. HŽ Putnički prijevoz operate refurbished Y1 diesel multiple units and new HŽ 7023 diesel multiple units on the track. Several times a day bus connection runs between Split airport/Trogir and Kastel Stari railway station, aligned with the train schedule.

==== Kopilica – Split ====
Split-Predgrađe (Kopilica) – Split line was served by 27 trains daily in each direction on the weekdays. Just one HŽ 7023 diesel multiple unit ran on the line. Its use caused disruption on lines towards Kastela and Perkovic. In early November 2019, Split (Kopilica) – Split (Harbor) services were discontinued in favor of better integrating Kastel Stari–Split line.

== Planned development ==
Due to the frequent traffic bottlenecks, jams, and the rapid increase in passenger traffic at the nearby Split Airport (doubling between 2013 and 2017 to 3 million passengers, increasing further at a 23% annual rate), the Split Suburban railway is planned to be extended for roughly 12–14 km (7.5–8.7 mi) further, beyond Kaštel Stari to Split Airport and running to Trogir as an end station. Some older studies from 2000 and 2003 also envisaged extending the line eastward, but this has since been dropped.

In 2006, Marijan Klarić, deputy CEO of HŽ Putnički prijevoz, announced the plans to overhaul the Split suburban railway, electrify the lines, add another set of tracks and extend the line to Trogir, but nothing happened. HŽ Putnički prijevoz invited the town of Split to work together on defining the new Trogir-Airport-Split railway in 2014. In 2017, a conceptual design study for the line was published. It probed into two different paths (north and south from D8 road), estimating that two viaducts and one tunnel should be built for the line. Kaštel Kambelovac, Split Airport and Trogir train stations would also be built from scratch. Split-Trogir line would have an annual capacity of 5.6 million passengers. The calculations estimated the cost at 500 million kuna.

=== 2017 ===
In August 2017, commemorating the anniversary of the re-establishment of the railway traffic between Split and the continental Croatia after the war in 1995, Split mayor Krstulović Opara announced the construction of the railway to Split Airport as "everyone's dream", vowing "not to stop" until the line is completed. In October 2017, after expressing the importance of this project, Split mayor met with local counterparts in Kaštela to discuss the development. Kaštela mayor Denis Ivanović stated that this line would be the most profitable railway line in Croatia.

=== 2018 ===
After a series of traffic jams on the route between Kastela and Split in March 2018, mayor Krstulović Opara cited them as a further proof that the road traffic is overwhelmed and that a new railway was necessary. Mayor's opposition, Split social democrats, also supported the new railway. On April 17, 2018, Split's mayor met with mayors of Kaštela, Solin and Trogir, HŽ Putnički prijevoz chair, HŽ Infrastruktura board member, as well as Split Airport director, Port authority, and the national Ministry of Maritime Affairs, Transport and Infrastructure representatives to discuss the project. The railway was deemed especially important in order to link the Split Airport to the Port of Split (next to the current Split main station) due to many of the 3 million airport passengers travelling to the Dalmatian islands. The integration and intermodality of the public transport of the Split region with a population of 300,000 was another important goal. Split-Kopilica was mentioned as an intermodal transport hub in order to alleviate the burden on the current Central Train Station in Split harbor, something advocated as early as 1939. HŽ Putnički prijevoz strongly supported the project, while the Ministry of Transport would finance the feasibility study. Kaštela and Trogir mayors stated that the general urban plan changes with respect to the new rail line have been ongoing in their jurisdictions. Split Airport and Port of Split directors expressed their intention to co-finance the project.

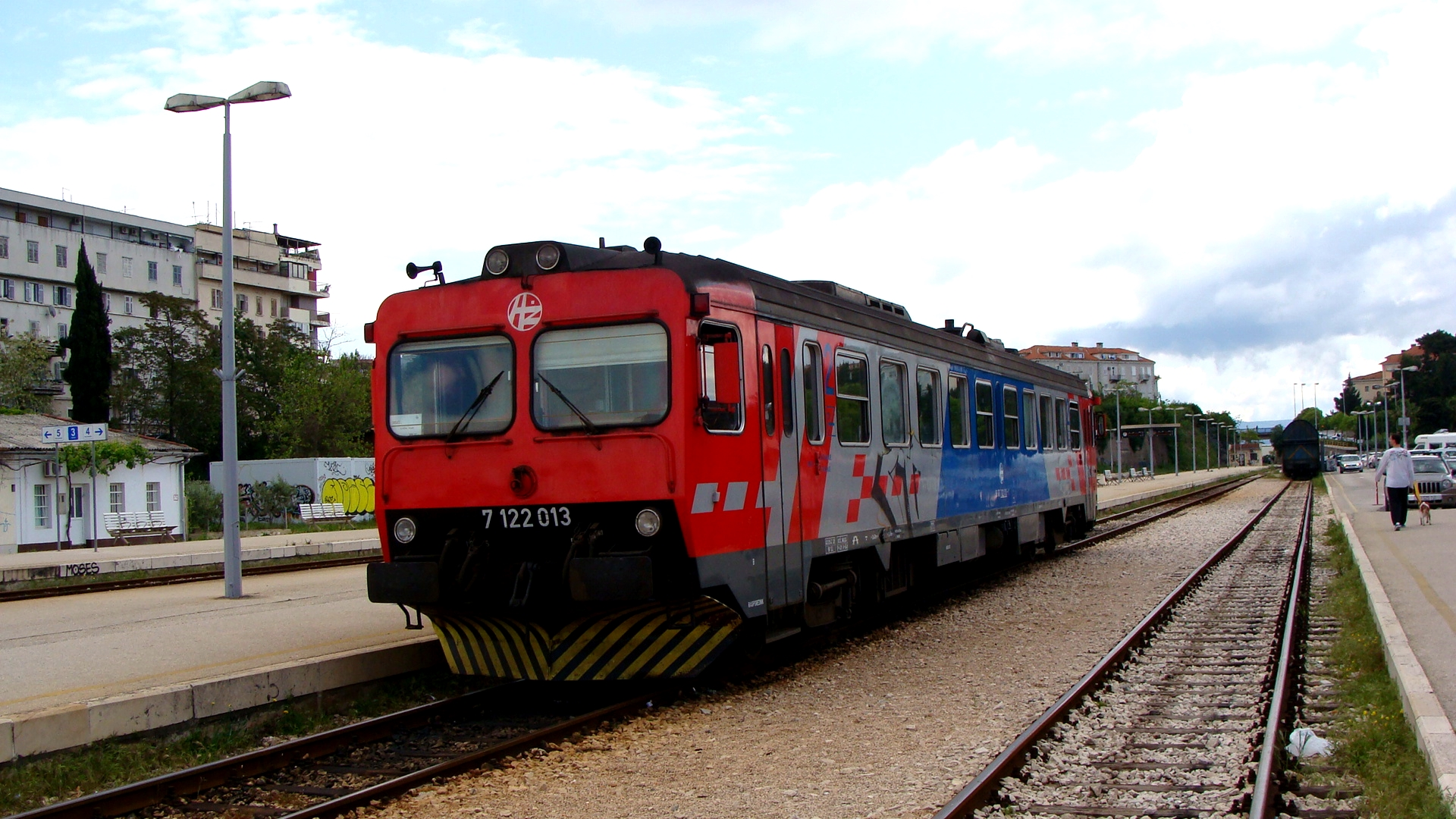
Suburban train at Split Railway station

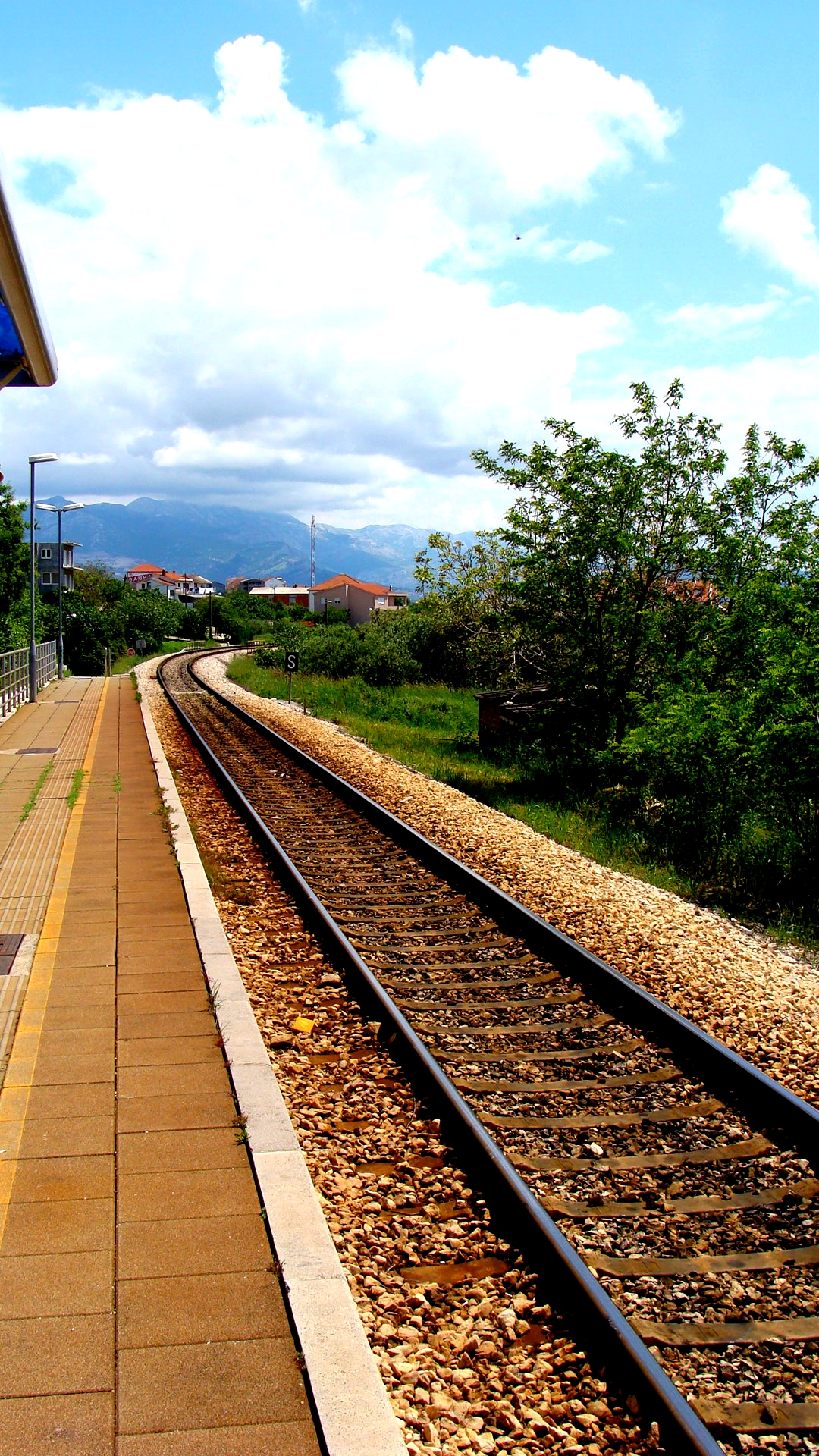
Kaštel Kambelovac train station

Under the auspices of the Croatian Chamber of Commerce and its vice president Mirjana Čagalj, on April 30, 2018, a memorandum establishing the multiyear partnership on Split area rail passenger traffic development was signed between the CR, local authorities, national ministry, and other stakeholders in the project. Two possible routes for the new line to Trogir were mentioned. The first one would branch off from the existing tracks from Kastel Stari to Divulje and further to Trogir. This would mean 7 km (4.3 mi) of new tracks of which 3.4 km (2.1 mi) would be underground. The section between Kaštel Stari and Divulje would cost €70 million, while the section between Divulje and Trogir would cost between €30 and 80 million. The second route would branch off from Kaštel Sućurac, requiring 12.6 km (7.8 mi) of tracks (11.6 km (7.2 mi) underground). The latter would cost €200 million just to reach Divulje. The case and development study planning would take 3–5 years, while the construction of the railway itself another 3–6 years. 8 train compositions would be bought for this line; Končar representatives presented the diesel multiple unit HZP 7-023 series to the stakeholders. Rail-workers' trade union representatives supported investing in the Split suburban rail network as a way to improve HŽ Putnički prijevoz's sustainability, profits, and mission fulfillment.

The Government of Croatia officially supported the project in a cabinet meeting held in Split on May 4, 2018. HŽ Infrastruktura was appointed as a key stakeholder, Ministry of Transport as a coordinator among the stakeholders and the local authorities, while the total cost was estimated at €1.1 billion. However, the Croatian government spoke solely of connecting the Split Airport with the Port of Split and building Split-Kopilica as an intermodal hub. The plans for extending the line to Trogir were dropped. This was reaffirmed on July 17, 2018, by the minister of transport Oleg Butković at the ceremonial opening of Čiovo bridge, stating that connecting Split Airport with the Port of Split by rail is the most important railway project in Croatia.

A new study on the proposed Split-Kastela-Airport-Trogir railway was published in the railway engineering journal in June 2018. It probed into the feasibility of two options: either linking the Split airport/Trogir with the existing M604 railway from Kaštel Stari (8 km (5.0 mi) track) on far west end of the urban area or from Kaštel Sućurac, very close to Split proper (12.6k. The latter would effectively create a proper suburban rail line connecting the entire Kastela area with Split, airport, and Trogir. The former would cost around 100-150 million euros, while the latter would cost 230-280 million due to the longer track and the route complexity (a tunnel underneath the D-8 road).

At a July 19 on-site meeting with the Split area mayors and the state secretary for transport, the CEO of HŽ Putnički prijevoz declared the opening of the new stations on the existing track (Split-H.B.Z., Split-Dujmovača, and Solin-Širine) to be the first step to follow. CR will draft the studies and necessary documents for the new line and new stations (Sv. Kajo, Kaštel Lukšić, Rudine, and Split Airport) in parallel. The feasibility study will be financed by the EU competitiveness and cohesion fund. The path of the new extended track and the point where it will branch off from the existing Split-Knin-Zagreb railway is yet to be defined. Split mayor emphasized the need to refurbish the railway infrastructure not only for the suburban traffic, but also for the more efficient railway link between Central Europe and Zagreb, and Split and Dalmatia.

On September 30, Split county prefect commented that the renovation and reconstruction of the existing M604 line section Split-Kastel Stari (Rudine) would commence already in 2019, with the construction of the link between the M604 and Split Airport / Trogir starting in 2021. This would imply the preference for the simpler solution instead of the new line running through/underneath Kastela proper. In November, a Kastela-based NGO came in favour of the new track through Kastela proper due to its commuting nature.

In December 2018, public stakeholders and local authorities together with HŽ Putnički prijevoz agreed on relocating the main railway hub and (temporarily) a new central bus station to Kopilica station (officially Split Predgrade), where a Park and Ride spot will be built as well. The construction was planned to finish in three months time, by June 2019. The lease for the property was also signed. The intention is to bring the commuting, long-distance bus and tourist traffic to Kopilica and then channel it onto Split urban metro, terminating at the current Main Railway Station in Split harbour. Trains between Kopilica and Split Main Station would run each 10 minutes and the ride would last for 3 minutes. Starting from March 2019, CR will open three new stations (Split-Dujmovača, Sveti Kajo and Solin-Širine) on the existing line, adding more commuters further out of the city, north from Kopilica. The existing pre-determined spot in railway tunnel between Kopilica and Split Main Station will be equipped and opened as an underground Split-H.B.Z. station. Split authorities will stimulate bus operators to use Kopilica (Split-Predgrade) as their terminal by charging 700-800kn per entry to the inner city center. News portal T-Portal and Slobodna Dalmacija local daily also reported that the "north" option to connect the Airport to M604, with a route avoiding Kastela, was the most likely solution in the long term. The design and the plan of the new temporary bus station / intermodal hub, the lack of plans of electrifying the existing track, leading to the difficulty of opening Split-H.B.Z. underground station amidst diesel exhaust fumes, and avoiding connecting Kastela commuting population to the suburban railway were criticized in the daily press as well as by the members of the Split City Council. Answering questions regarding electrification and timing of the construction, Split deputy mayor Nino Vela stated at a Council meeting that electrification was discussed with HŽ Infrastruktura. However, this would require substantial investments and construction of a major traction substation. The opening and integration of first five stations will be prioritized, with the construction of the Split-H.B.Z. underground station to start in 2020. Split chamber of architects (Društvo arhitekata Split) publicly criticized and rejected both the design and the temporary nature of Kopilica intermodal transport hub. The opposition in Split city council pointed at unresolved legal and real estate ownership issues around Kopilica station (Split-Predgrade).

=== 2019 ===
The City of Split published a tender for the (re)construction of temporary Kopilica hub, planning to spend 5 million HRK, but only one company replied and submitted an offer, estimating the cost at over 14 million HRK. Due to the cost discrepancy, city authorities cancelled the call for bids and announced a launch of a new one. A new bid was launched on 25 January, reducing the construction work deemed necessary (reducing P+R parking places and canopies), and increasing the expected cost by more than 30%. Split mayor Krstulovic-Opara stated in an interview to Vecernji list on January 19 that his priority is to connect Trogir, Kastela, Solin and Split agglomeration with rail.

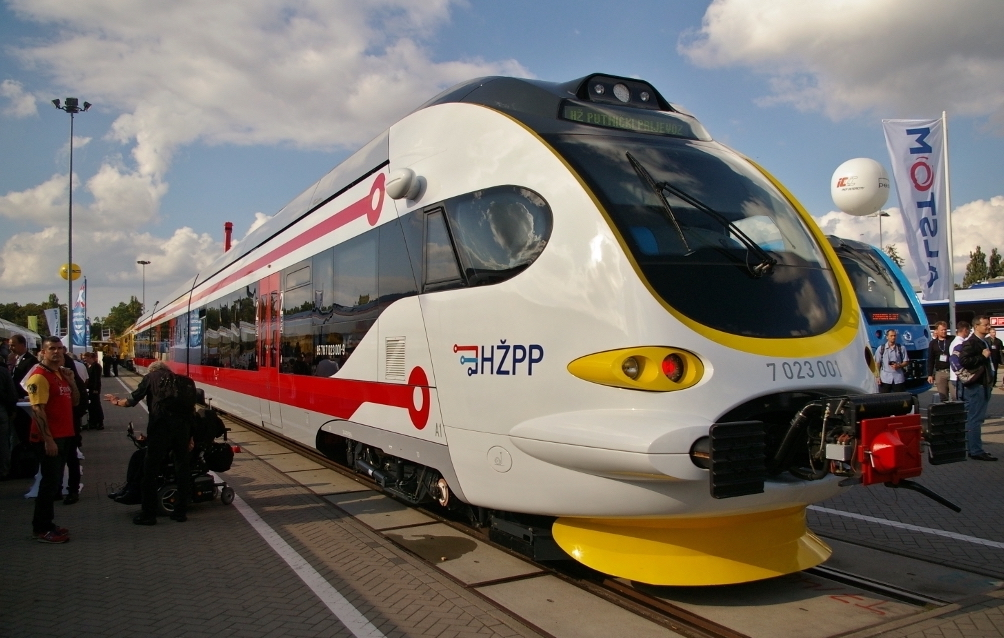
Končar- and Gredelj-produced HŽ 7023 diesel multiple unit is to serve the line starting from summer 2019

In January 2019, internet news portal T-portal reported that the feasibility study (contrary to the earlier studies, such as that of Matić, Nosal and Mikec from 2018) concluded that the 8 km (5.0 mi) connection between Kaštel Stari station (on the existing M604 tracks) via Rudine to Split Airport, bypassing Kastela proper, is the most favourable solution to integrate the airport onto the suburban railway. Its construction is planned to finish by 2025–6. People living in the buildings around Kopilica station expressed their disapproval for the plans. The January issue of Građevinar, journal of the Croatian Association of Civil Engineers, reported that the planned route to Split Airport will branch off earlier, from Kaštel Kambelovac station, running along D58 and thus through Kaštela proper.

Civil engineers of Split criticized the way forward regarding Kopilica hub. City representatives announced that one train operating every 10–12 minutes in peak hours will serve the line, while they are negotiating the addition of a second train. Split chamber of architects president criticized the lack of development studies and any traffic impact studies. In mid-February, two companies submitted their bids for the construction tender for temporary Kopilica hub. Together with the construction supervision, costs of refurbishing Kopilica hub were estimated at 11 million HRK, while the reconstruction of adjacent Hercegovacka street, started in February, cost additional 2.2 million. Bid was awarded to Čitić gradnja. Citizens living in 52 households around Kopilica [split-Predgrade] station, heavily concerned about the plans, lack of transparency, and their future life quality around the hub and the bus/train station, organized a protest. The opposition in Split council called for the plans of a temporary hub in Kopilica to be scrapped and a proper architectural and urban planning solution to be devised, estimating the time frame unrealistic. In March it was reported that the rail tunnel does not have the necessary permits, which would result in shelving the plans for the Split-H.B.Z. metro station, but the city administration dismissed those claims. In a town hall meeting, Split city representatives claimed that the frequency of trains running between Kopilica hub and Split Main Station will follow from the needs as defined by the city administration and that HŽ Infrastruktura have already started refurbishing Rudine station. Split chapter of the Croatian Chamber of Commerce presented the plan for connecting Split Airport through Kopilica with the city center to airport management in an on-site March 14 meeting.

In mid-March, Split city administration presented the first draft of the EBRD co-financed masterplan concerning urban redevelopment, dubbed "Split United." The plan includes light-rail connecting Split airport to Split harbor via Kopilica hub. An electrified rail line connecting the two is seen as a crucial factor. The funds for electrification of the existing rail line and the construction of the new segment are planned to be sought in EU cohesion funds between 2020 and 2027. State secretary in the Ministry of transport, T. Mihotić, remarked that the goal is to connect Trogir to the railway as well, while the electrification timeline is not on the table as this line is not on the priority list of HŽ Infrastruktura. Split Main Railway Station, located on the eastern part of Split harbour, was proposed to be retained as a terminus, dug in underground and refurbished. These plans were heavily criticized by mayor heading the preceding city administration.

On March 20, Croatian minister for transport and infrastructure Oleg Butkovic visited Split Airport and stated that the 7 km (4.3 mi) of new tracks necessary to connect the airport to Split with rail are in the planning process by HŽ Infrastruktura and that he hopes that the work will commence in 2021.

In early April, HŽ Infrastruktura published an open bid for plans to renovate the railway tunnel and to build an underground station "Split-H.B.Z." inside of it. The plan foresees exclusive use of diesel trains in the tunnel.

External image
- Different routes proposed as of September 2019 (in red). Existing railroad tracks in black.

In September it was reported that, out of three proposed options, Kastela city administration supported the railway line extension from Kastel Kambelovac as opposed to branching off further away, at Kastel Stari station (€300 million), despite the higher cost. However, Kastela mayor wanted to probe into digging the line underground, which was deemed too expensive. Additionally, Kastela mayor also proposed changes to the latter layout option (branching off from Kastela Stari station / Rudine hamlet), citing conservation and agriculture damage as main reasons. In October, deeming Kastela proposal too difficult as it contains high elevation, HŽ Infrastruktura came back to the Ministry of Transport with yet another layout proposal. The new tracks would branch off from Kastel Kambelovac and would be built on pillars between the D8 road dual carriageway. CR-Infrastructure claimed that this option would be cheaper than digging the rail underground, the construction would cause less interruption, and there would be no legal or expropriation issues.

=== 2020 ===
In March 2020, HŽ Infrastruktura board member Darko Barišić presented ongoing plans to local stakeholders. They would invest 3,6 million HRK in reconstruction of Split-Predgrade station; further 7,5 million will be spent on building new stations (Dujmovača, Solin-Širina and Sveti Kajo), with construction work to commence in spring 2020. Underground station Split - HBZ was estimated to cost 60 million. Rudine, a new station where the new railway to Split Airport and further to Trogir would branch off from M604, is yet to be planned pending the selection of the optimal route after the feasibility study. Barisic said CR are to electrify the line.

=== Since 2020 ===
No progress has been made since 2020. The construction of the Split-HBZ station was to be completed in 2021. As of 2022, the construction works have not begun.

In 2021, Ivica Puljak was elected mayor of Split, defeating Vice Mihanović, the candidate of Croatia's ruling HDZ party. During the election campaign, the Split metro was completely out of focus. As of 2022, it's still out of focus. Neither local nor national politicians talk about it.

== Literature ==
- Ivanovski, D (2015). Kolodvor Kopilica, Split (Thesis) (in Croatian). Split: Sveučilište u Splitu, Fakultet građevinarstva, arhitekture i geodezije.
- Lalić, Dean; Špehar Kroflin, Snježana (2011). "Novo željezničko stajalište Split H.B.Z. i protupožarna sanacija tunela Split" [New Split H.B.Z. railway station and fire protection renovation of the Split tunnel] (PDF). Željeznice (in Croatian). 21 (10(2)): 21–24. ISSN 1333-7971.
- Mlinarević, M. (2010). "Studija razvoja i unapređenja kvalitete usluga gradsko-prigradskog željezničkog prijevoza putnika Grada Splita i Splitsko-dalmatinske županije" [Study of the development and improvement of the quality of urban-suburban railway passenger transport services in the City of Split and Split-Dalmatia County] (Document) (in Croatian). HŽ Putnički prijevoz/Inženjerski biro/Convena konzalting.
- Višnjić, Vinko; Pušić, Marko; Žižić, Ivan (2007). "Traffic and Technological Assumptions for the Metro in the City of Split". Promet-Traffic&Transportation. 19 (3).
- Vojnović, Jure (1992). Željeznica Split - Trogir [Split - Trogir railway] (Thesis) (in Croatian). Split: University of Split.
