= NK Jadran =

NK Jadran may refer to:

- NK Jadran Dekani, football club from Dekani, Slovenia
- NK Jadran Hrpelje-Kozina, football club from Hrpelje-Kozina, Slovenia
- NK Jadran Poreč, football club from Poreč, Croatia
- NK Jadran Luka Ploče, football club from Ploče, Croatia
- NK Jadran Kaštel Sućurac, football club from Kaštel Sućurac, Croatia
