= Vitturi Castle =

Castle in Croatia

Coordinates: 43°33′18″N 16°22′05″E

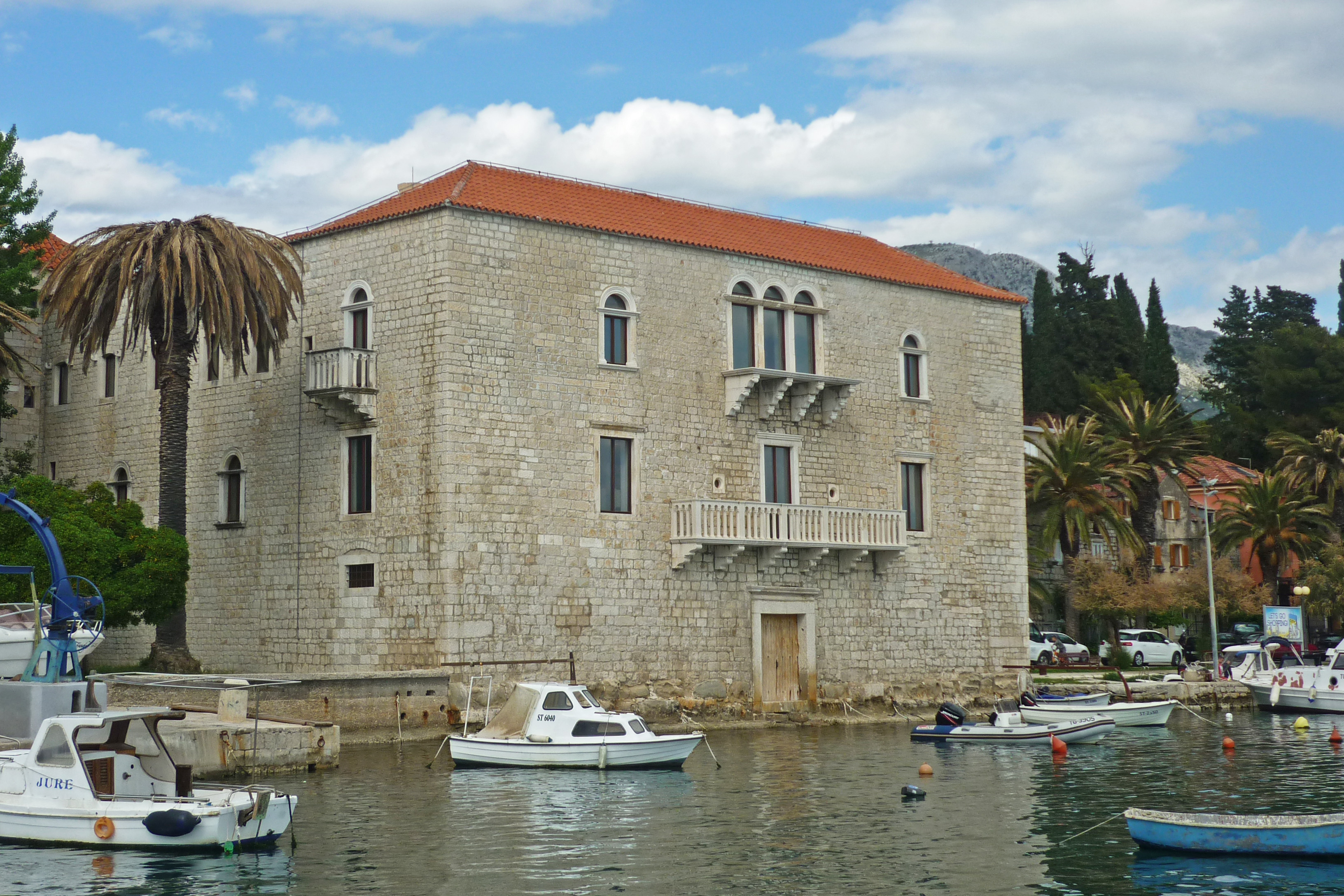
The Vitturi Castle

The Vitturi Castle is a 15th-century castle in Kaštel Lukšić, a town within the administrative area of Kaštela in Dalmatia, Croatia.

== History ==
Vitturi Castle was built by the aristocratic family Vitturi from Trogir, at the end of the 15th century. Two noblemen from Trogir, Nikola and Jerolim Vitturi, built the castle in order to provide protection not only for the Vitturi family but also for the population of the nearby village of Ostrog. The castle was built in the style of a luxurious renaissance palace and it was completed in 1564. It consisted of a residential building and two defence towers and it was connected to the mainland with a drawbridge. In the 18th century the drawbridge was replaced with a stone bridge. Near the castle there is a classicistic park dating from the second half of the 18th century. The park was also designed by the Vitturi family. In 1968 it was proclaimed a monument of park architecture.

Nowadays, the renovated Vitturi castle has become the cultural centre of Kaštel Lukšić, as a place where numerous exhibitions, concerts and plays are held. In addition to that, the town museum and other cultural institutions are situated in the former residential part of the castle. The Vitturi castle is famous not only for its beauty but also for a legend concerning one of its inhabitants – Dobrila Vitturi.

== Legend of Miljenko and Dobrila ==
The legend of Miljenko and Dobrila is a tragic story about two lovers from Kaštel Lukšić, who are often described as the Croatian Romeo and Juliet. The legend was used as a basis for a number of novels, operas and plays. The story dates from the second half of the 17th century, when two noble families lived in Kaštel Lukšić – the Vitturi family with their daughter Dobrila and the Rušinić family with their son Miljenko.

According to the legend, Miljenko and Dobrila fell in love, but they had to keep their relationship secret because of a long-lasting feud between their families. When their parents found out about their relationship, they decided to separate them. Miljenko was sent off to Venice, while Dobrila’s father arranged for her to marry a much older nobleman from Trogir. However, Miljenko found out about his plans and came back from Venice just in time to stop the wedding. As a result, he was banished from Kaštel Lukšić and Dobrila was sent to a convent. However, she escaped with the intention of being reunited with Miljenko and marrying him secretly. When Dobrila's father found out that she had escaped from the convent, he decided to bring her home at any cost. He sent a messenger to find the two lovers and to tell them that he would no longer oppose their marriage and that they could come home. The lovers accepted his proposal, returned to Kaštel Lukšić and got married. But when the wedding celebration was over, Dobrila’s father, consumed with rage, killed Miljenko. Several months later Dobrila died of sadness. Her only wish was to be buried next to Miljenko. Their grave can be found in the church of St. John in Kaštel Lukšić, and it is famous for the inscription ‘Rest in peace, lovers’.
