= Kaštel Novi =

- Settlement
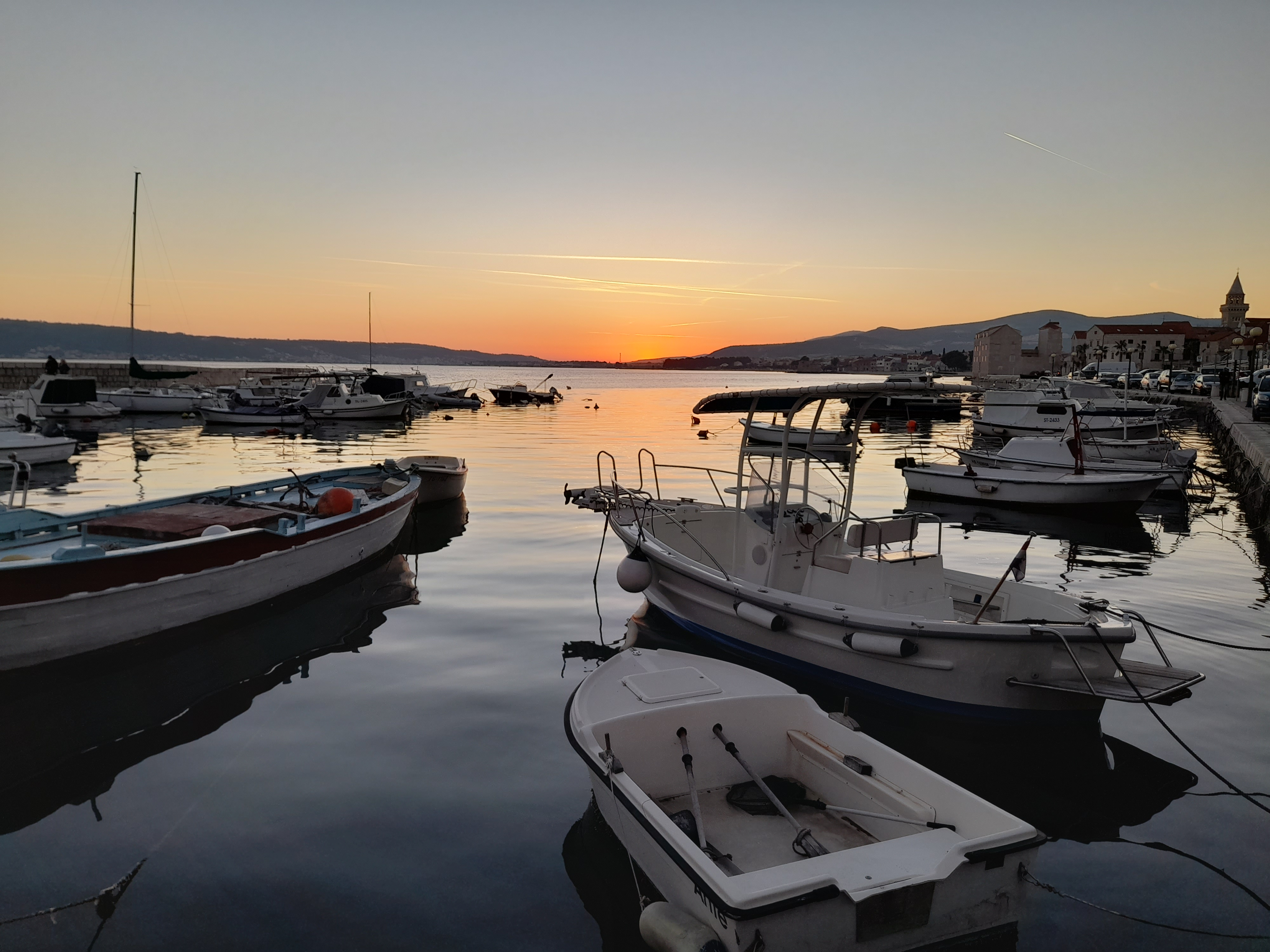
- Sunset over Kaštel Novi

- Location within Croatia
- Coordinates: 43°33′N 16°20′E
- Country: Croatia
- County: Split-Dalmatia
- City: Kaštela

Area
  - Total: 11.5 km^{2} (4.4 sq mi)

Population (2021)
  - Total: 6,507
  - Density: 566/km^{2} (1,470/sq mi)
- Time zone: UTC+1 (CET)
  - Summer (DST): UTC+2 (CEST)

Kaštel Novi is a settlement within the town of Kaštela in Dalmatia, Croatia. Its name means new castle.

== History ==
Kaštel Novi was founded in 1512.

The Fortified village of Cippico-after the fall of Bosnia in 1463, Dalmatia, which was at the time part of the Venetian Republic, faced danger from the Ottoman invaders. In 1537, Klis fell under their administration, and the Kastela field was exposed to their frequent incursions. From the end of the 15th century until the 17th century, landowners between Split and Togir-the Split archbishopric, the Benedictine monastery as well as the noblemen of Trogir and Split, built seventeen forts and twelve fortified villages wishing to protect their land and people. it is after these forts citadels that the entire area was named Kastela (Citadels).

In the beginning of the 16th century, Pavao Antun Cippico, a nobleman from Trogir and nephew of Kariolan Cippico, built a tower on the rocks. the fortified village of citadel Cippico was first mentioned in 1515. It developed on the filled in area north of the tower. The village was fortified by a defensive wall on the east, north and west with towers on the northeastern and northwestern corners. The village walls were about 7 metre high and originally had a wooden walkway. The contours of the walls have been preserved in the walls of the houses. The fortified village had one exit-the northern gate that was accessed over the stone bridge onto which a drawbridge was lowered. Following the end of the dangers, the village spread outside of the walls, the area in front of the citadel was filled in which is how 'Brce' developed, an urban type village square with a baroque monumental building of the Fraternity of St Peter built in the 18th century. At the end of the 19th century, a marina developed in front of the village. The Katalinic family built storage warehouses by the tower, on the shore. The Parish Church of Ste Peter built in 1902 stands on the west, outside of the walls of the fortified village, at the site of a medieval church and monastery of St Peter of Klobucac from the 17th century. Part of its apse belonged to the older church from the 18th century.
