= Kaštela =

Town in Dalmatia, Croatia

- Town
- Grad Kaštela; Town of Kaštela
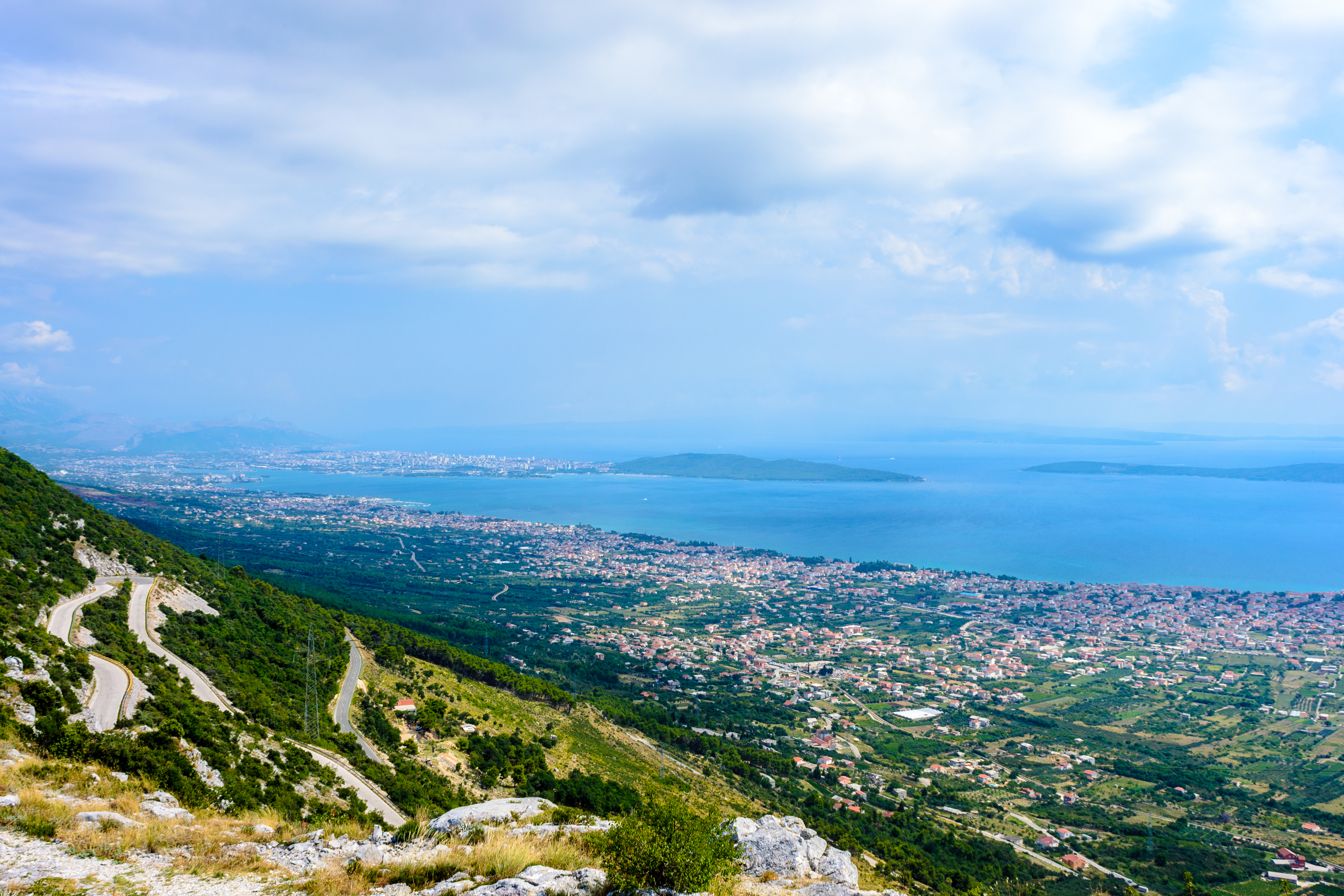
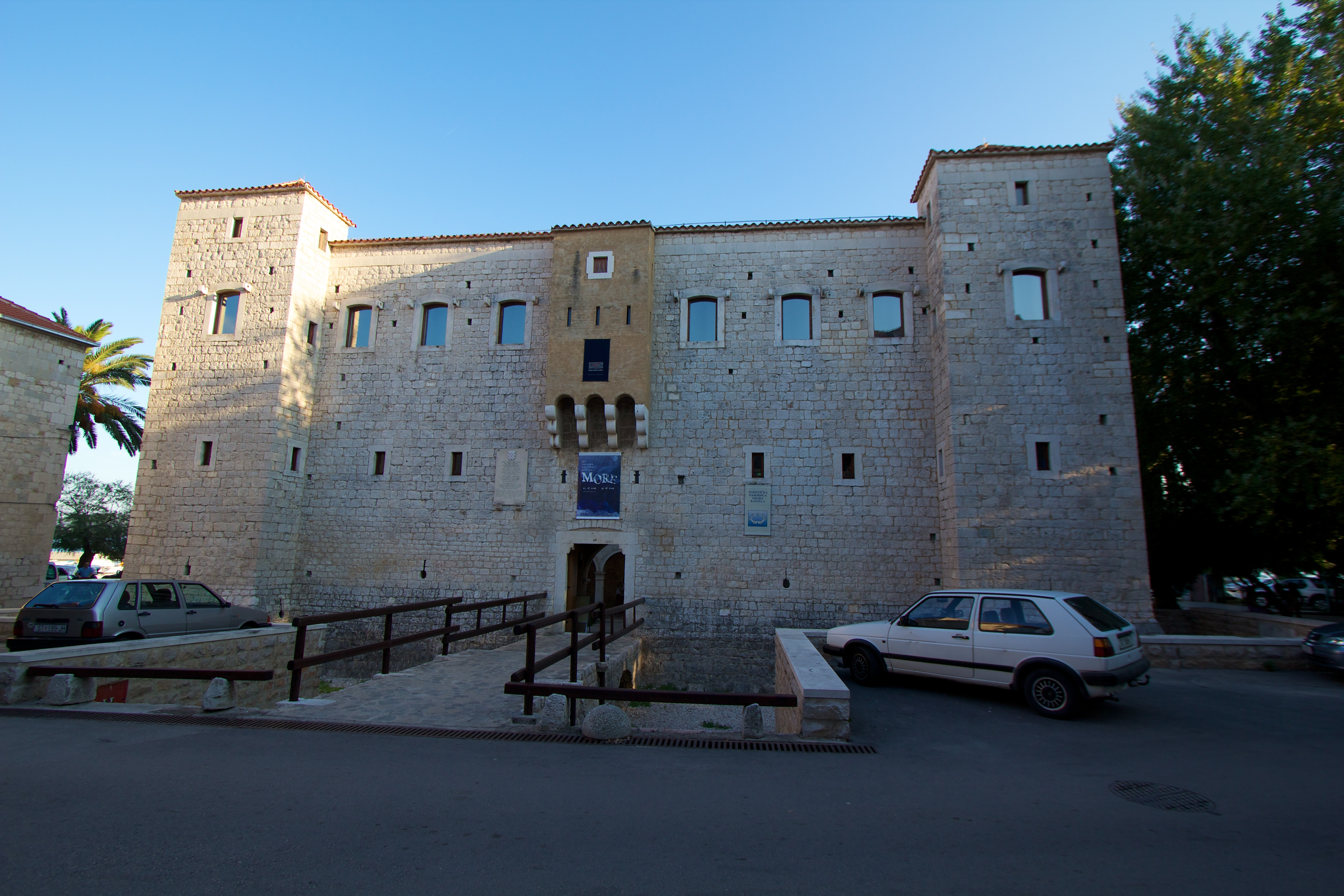
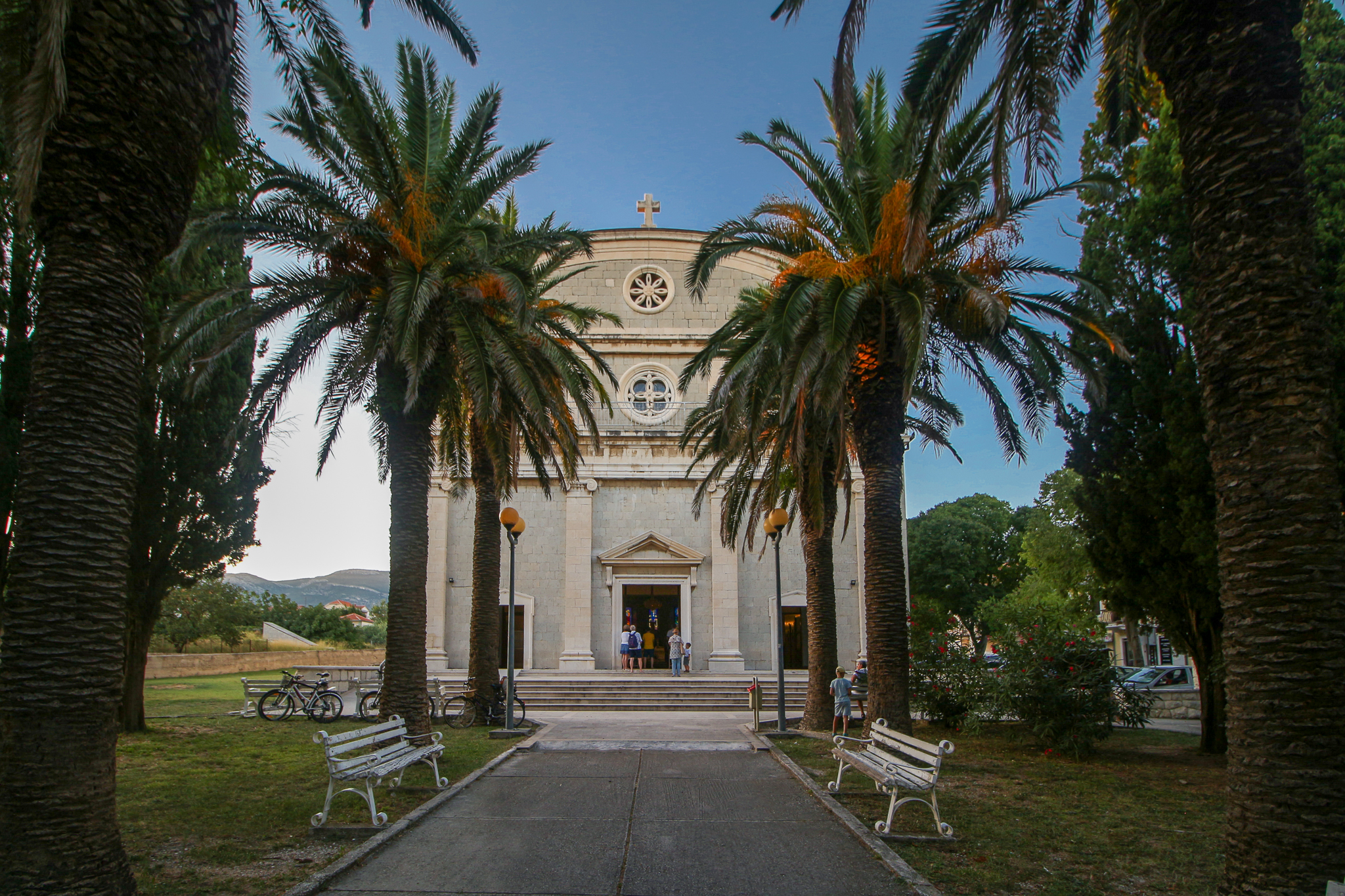
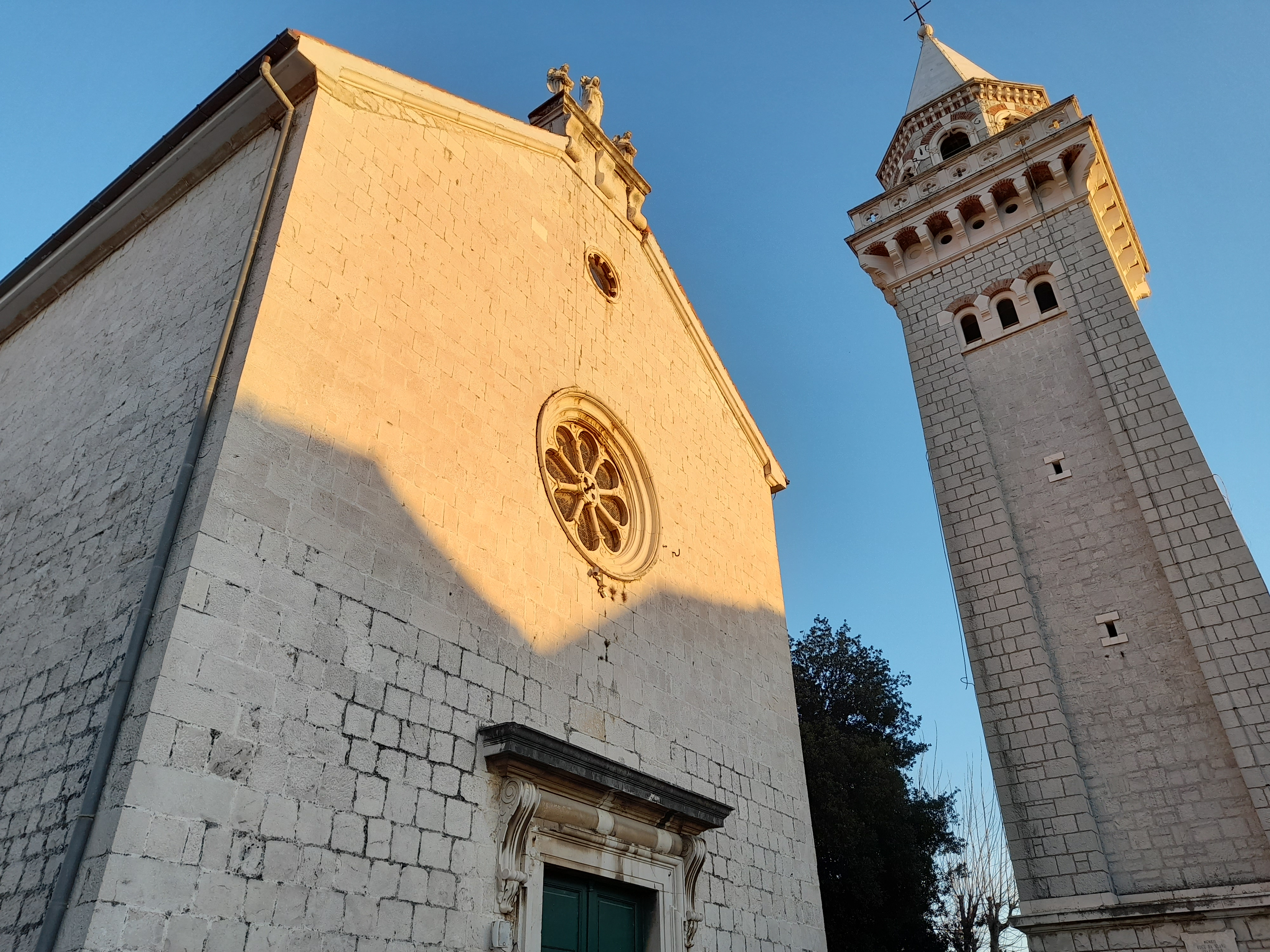
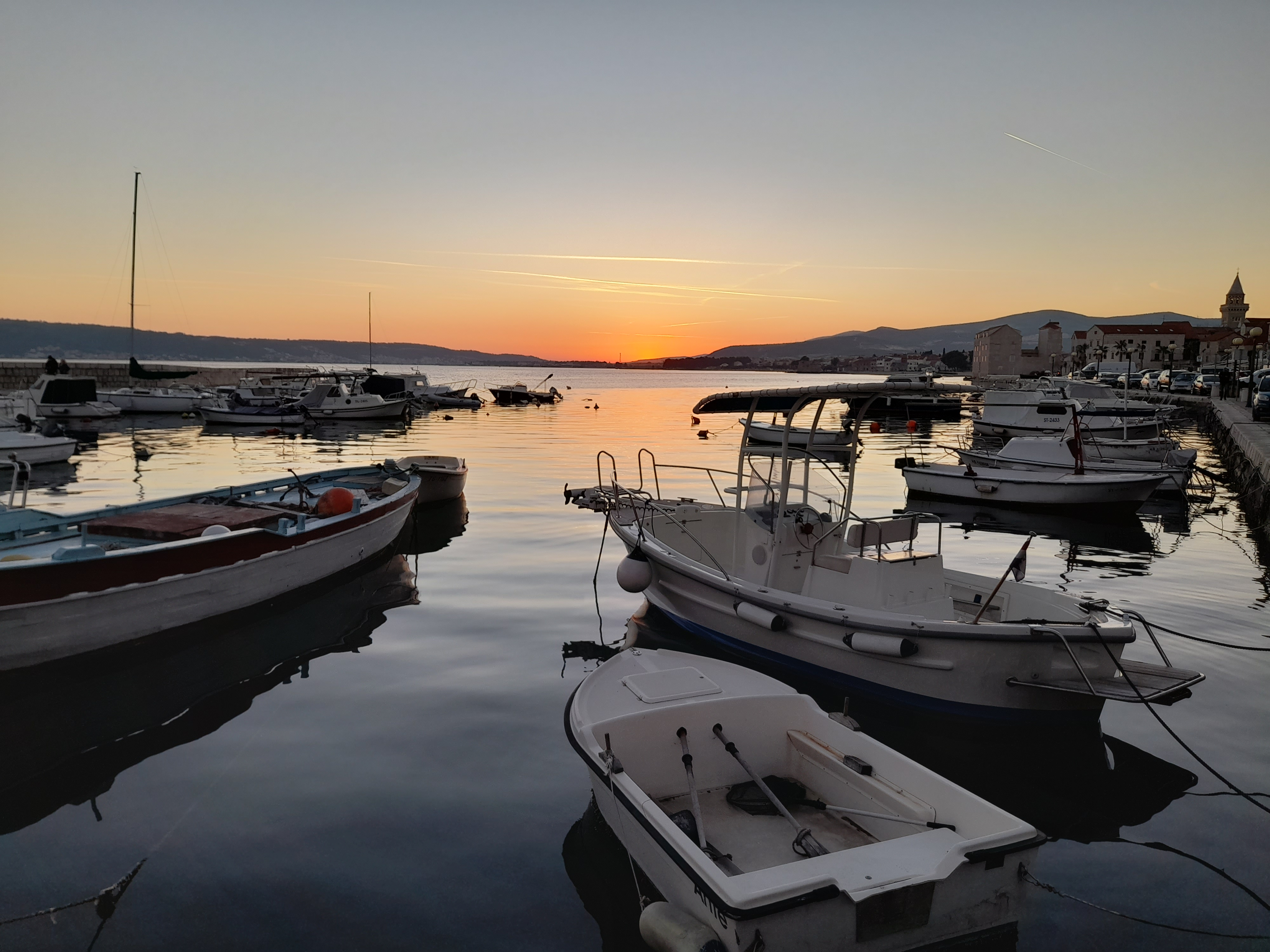
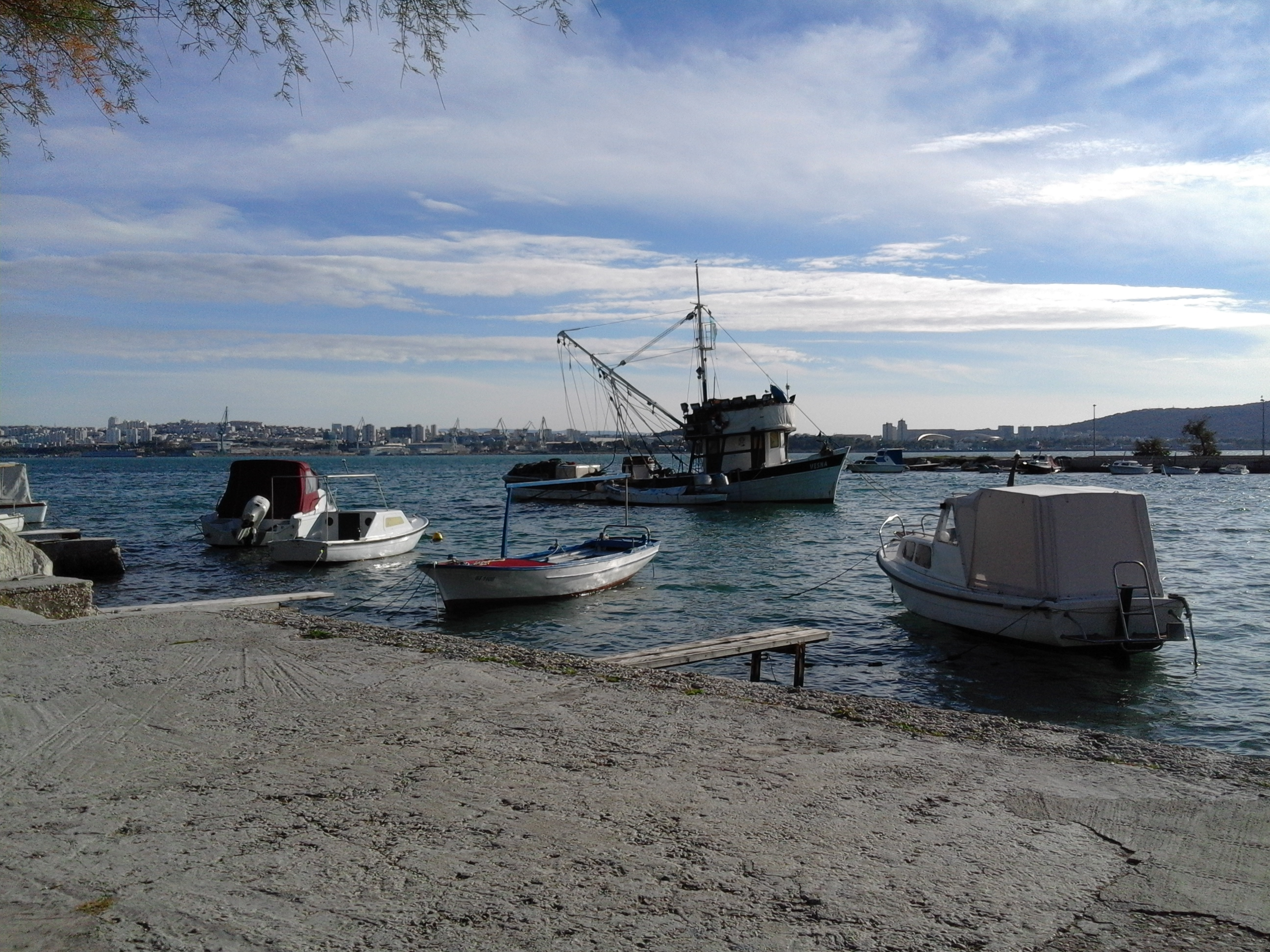
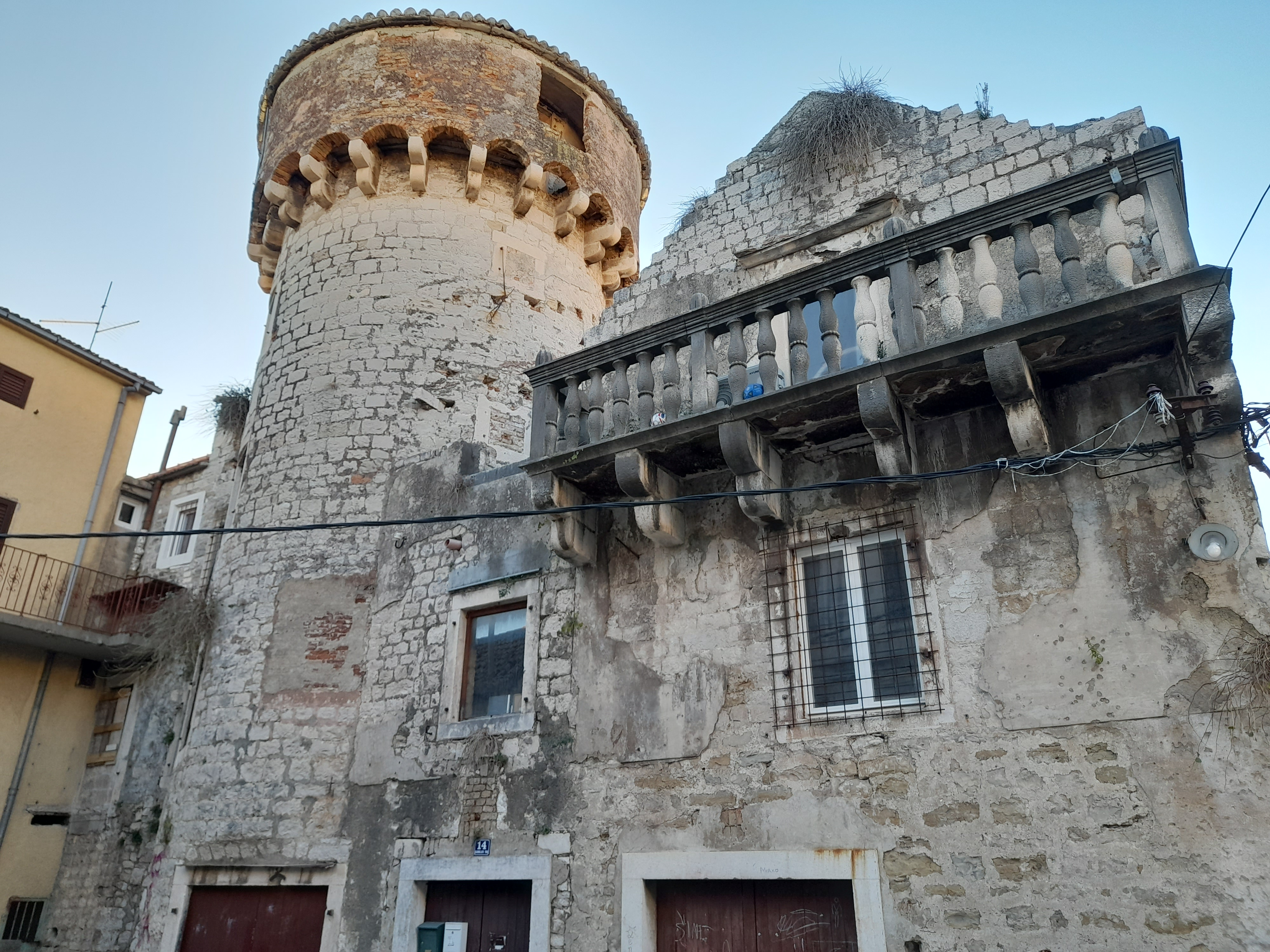
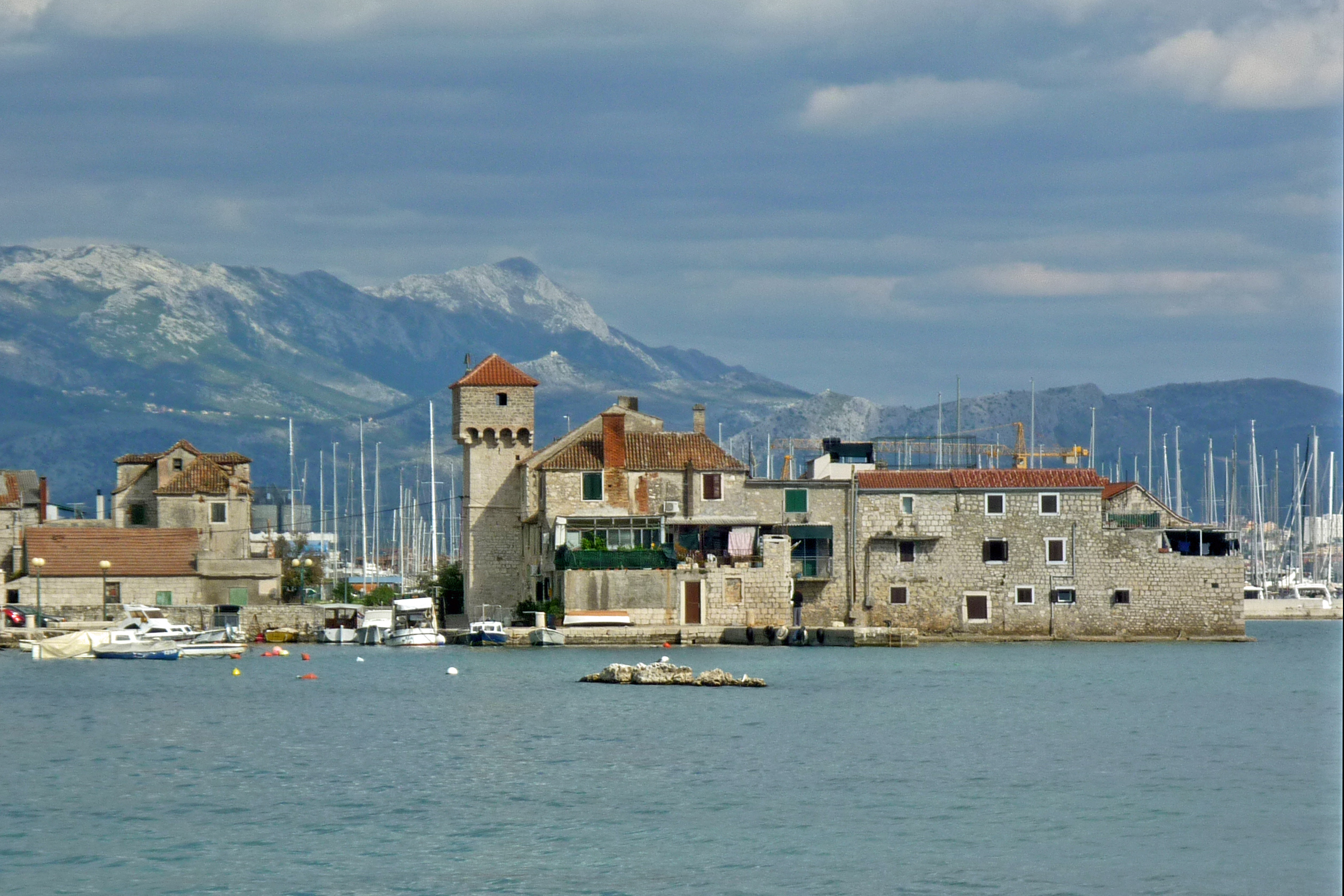
- Clockwise from Top: Aerial view of Kaštela, Kaštel Stari, Kaštel Novi, Kaštel Kambelovac, Kaštel Gomilica; Kaštel Sućurac, Kaštel Štafilić & Kaštel Lukšić

- Seal
- Interactive map of Kaštela
- Location of Kaštela in Croatia Kaštela (Croatia)
- Coordinates: 43°33′N 16°23′E
- Country: Croatia
- Region: Dalmatia
- County: Split-Dalmatia County

Government
  - Mayor: Denis Ivanović (HDZ)

Area
  - Total: 57.6 km^{2} (22.2 sq mi)
- Elevation: 3 m (9.8 ft)

Population (2021)
  - Total: 37,794
  - Density: 656/km^{2} (1,700/sq mi)
- Time zone: UTC+1 (CET)
  - Summer (DST): UTC+2 (CEST)
- Postal code: 21212
- Area code: 021
- Vehicle registration: ST
- Website: kastela.hr

Kaštela (pronounced [kǎʃte̞la]) is a town and a suburb of Split in Dalmatia, Croatia. The town is an agglomeration of seven individual settlements which are administered as a single municipality, with populations individually ranging from 3,000 to 7,000 residents. The town is located northwest of Split proper, west of Solin and east of Trogir, on the central Dalmatian coast. With a total population of 37,794 as of 2021 census, it is the 14th largest town in the country.

== History ==
In the area of today's Kaštela, in the Early Iron Age – from the 9th to the 5th century BC. – the first Illyrian settlements (fortresses) were established in the area of Biranj, Luko and Ostrožine. Traces of life in the Kaštela area can be found as early as prehistoric times, as evidenced by the sources from Mujina cave, which is located in a mountainous area above Plano on the way to Prgomet. Prehistoric man settled in this area and then he found enough fertile soil and drinking water here. From the 1st century BC they were under Roman Empire rule, when a large number of summer houses (villae rusticae) were built for the needs of Roman veterans; the remains of the Siculi settlement near Resnik have been preserved from that period. A large number of buildings date from the early Christian and early Croatian periods; the remains of churches and buildings of early Croatian rulers have been found at the sites of Bijaći, Putalj, Kozice, Lažane, Ostrog and Sv. Petar od Klobučac.

The local population came into contact with the Greeks already present in Trogir, their culture and art. The area of the Resnik port bears witness to the trade between the Greeks, as numerous artifacts from the Hellenistic period have been found there.

In the Middle Ages, the area of Kaštela Field, as an integral part of the royal estate (territorium regale), was included in the communal estate of Split and Trogir by royal grants, and became the subject of numerous disputes between these two cities. From 1420, together with the rest of the Dalmatian coast, it was included in the territory of the Venetian Republic. From the end of the 14th century nobles from nearby towns built sixteen fortress-palaces to defend against the Ottomans; around seven of them, settlements formed, consisting of regularly arranged peasant houses within the walls. The castles had Renaissance architectural features, luxurious inner courtyards and rich interiors. Until 1797, the castles were part of the Venetian Republic, from 1797 to 1806 part of the Austrian part of the Habsburg Monarchy, from 1806 to 1813 part of the French Illyrian provinces, and from 1815 they were again part of the Habsburg Monarchy. When a new administrative division was introduced in 1822, small municipalities (so-called unions) were established in the area of the castles: Kaštel Lukšić and Kaštel Kambelovac (together with Kaštel Sućurac and Kaštel Gomilica) which belonged to the Split district and the Kaštel Novi union (with Kaštel Štafilić and Kaštel Stari). In 1847, the Lukšić and Kambelovac unions merged.

== Geography ==
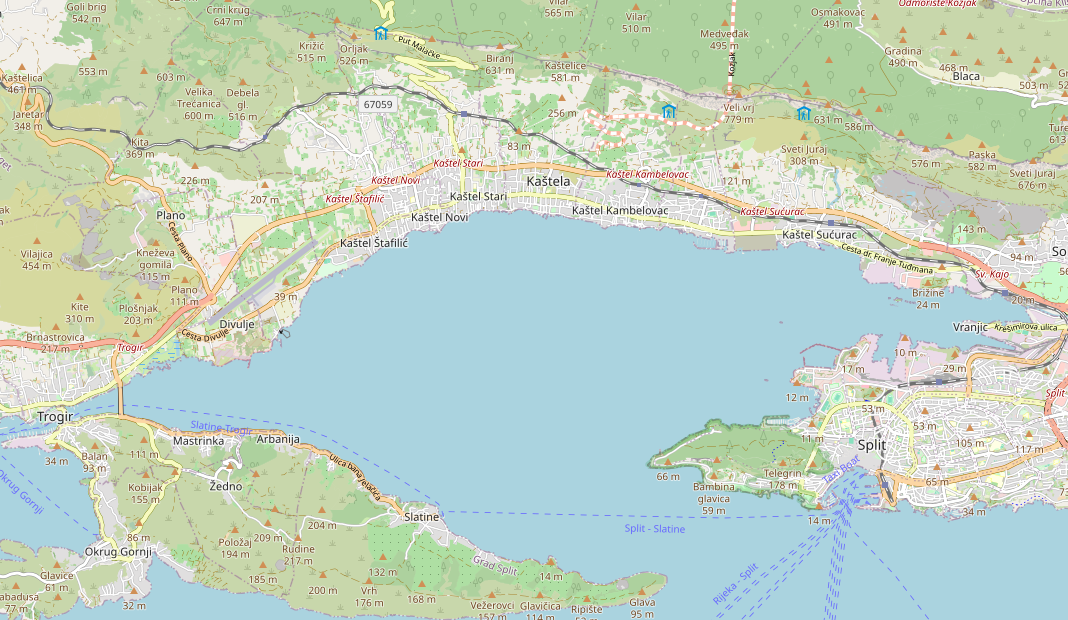
Road map of Kaštela bay

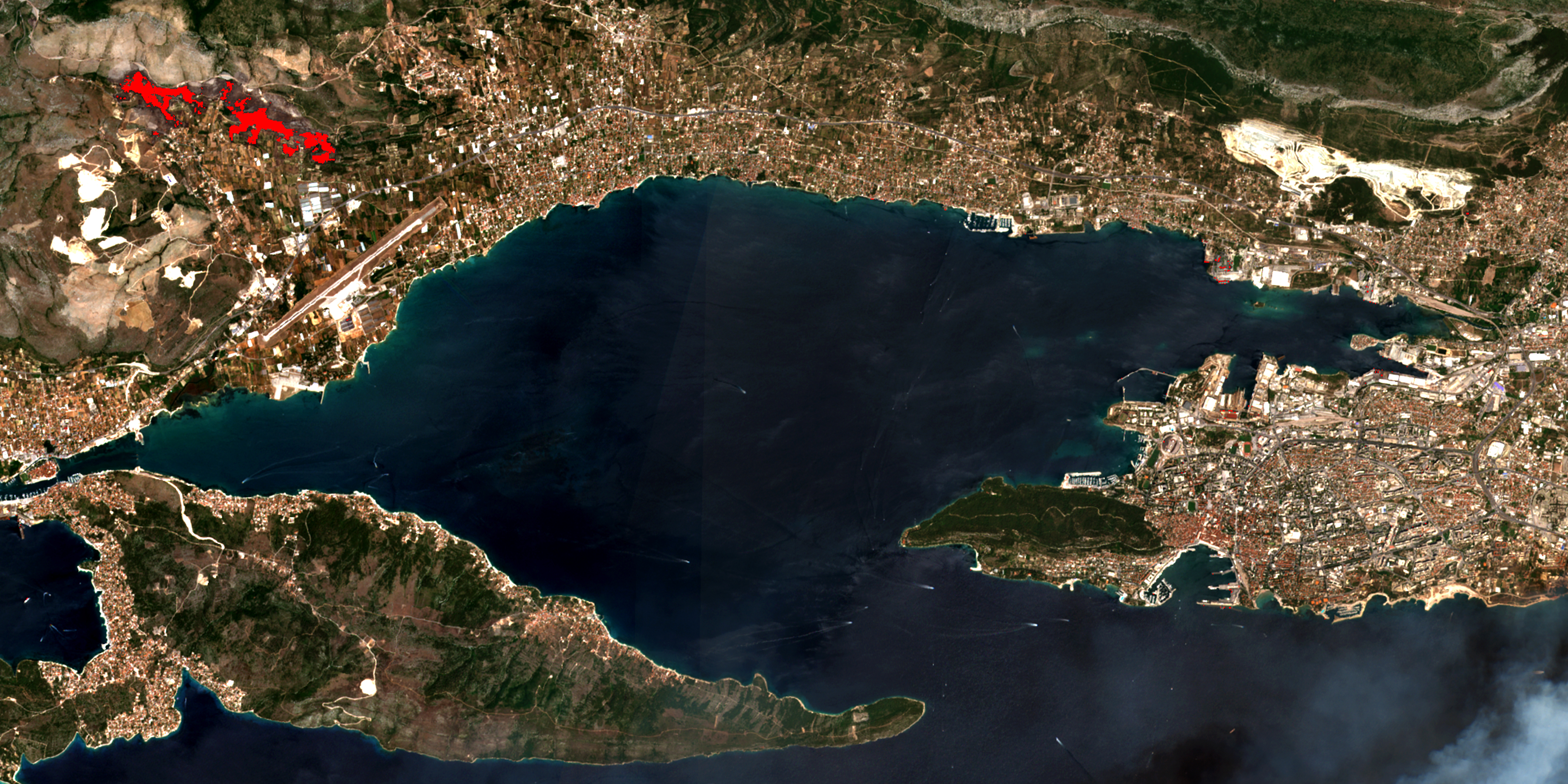
Satellite view of Kaštela bay

The town of Kaštela is located in Dalmatia region, in Kaštelanski zaljev (Kaštela bay), between the city of Trogir on the west and Solin on the east, or the island of Čiovo and Marjan hill (780 m), underneath the Kozjak mountain. It stretches for approximately 20 km and it consists of following settlements (from Trogir to Solin):

- Kaštel Štafilić (2,822)
- Kaštel Novi (6,507)
- Kaštel Stari (6,950)
- Kaštel Lukšić (5,221)
- Kaštel Kambelovac (5,051)
- Kaštel Gomilica (4,699)
- Kaštel Sućurac (6,544)

Kaštela is an urbanized area with a rich agricultural environment (vines, fruits, vegetables, flowers), developed industry (cement, chemical industry) and tourism. Split Airport is located in the western part of Kaštela (in Kaštel Štafilić).

== Overview ==
The Kaštela Riviera is a fertile area, about 20 kilometres (12 miles) in length, featuring the first Roman floating docks and 50 places on the long, verdant area, northwest of Split. It is divided into Gornja (upper) and Donja Kaštela (lower), and it consists of seven old and two recently created settlements. The Kaštela is located in the Mediterranean, and it has been a point of interest for many ancient peoples.

Once an ancient Greek port, a stopover point for Roman veterans and a summer place for Croatian kings is today a tourist resort, carrying the same name. Along its long sandy beach there are terraces and viewpoints, tennis and other sports grounds, surrounded by greenery of pine and tamaris trees.

The Jadro River (the original water supply for the ancient city of Diocletian's Palace) flows through the town of Solin and provides water supply to both Split and Kaštela. Contemporary studies indicate favourable water quality levels of the river near the headwaters at Jadro Spring. Certain other studies of hydrology and sedimentation have been conducted in this area.

== Climate ==
Since records began in 1981, the highest temperature recorded at the local weather station was 42.2 °C (108.0 °F), on 2 August 2017. The coldest temperature was −8.2 °C (17.2 °F), on 7 January 2017.

== Population ==
Historical population
Year	Pop.	±%
1857	5,097	—
1869	5,829	+14.4%
1880	5,981	+2.6%
1890	6,582	+10.0%
1900	7,286	+10.7%
1910	7,460	+2.4%
1921	8,346	+11.9%
1931	8,895	+6.6%
1948	9,731	+9.4%
1953	11,036	+13.4%
1961	13,526	+22.6%
1971	18,805	+39.0%
1981	24,328	+29.4%
1991	29,168	+19.9%
2001	34,103	+16.9%
2011	38,667	+13.4%
2021	37,794	−2.3%
Source: Naselja i stanovništvo Republike Hrvatske 1857–2021, DZS

Town of Kaštela: Population trends 1857–2021
v

population	5097	5829	5981	6582	7286	7460	8346	8895	9731	11036	13526	18805	24328	29168	34103	38667	37794
	1857	1869	1880	1890	1900	1910	1921	1931	1948	1953	1961	1971	1981	1991	2001	2011	2021

Sources: Croatian Bureau of Statistics publications

== Economy ==
The industrial zone is developed, and there is an aluminium extraction facility in the vicinity of Kaštel Sućurac and the Split Airport is located in Kaštel Štafilić. Present area of Kaštela and its inland in the vicinity of ancient Salona were inhabited very early (the finds from the Roman and Old Croatian period).

== Culture ==
Folklore society KUD 7 Kaštela was formed in 1980. Society organizes annual "Tamburica & Mandolina" folklore summer event, with folklore societies from Slavonija and Dalmatia.

== Twin towns – sister cities ==
Kaštela is twinned with:

- Bardejov, Slovakia
- Hradec Králové, Czech Republic
- Kiseljak, Bosnia and Herzegovina
- Kupres, Bosnia and Herzegovina
- Lindlar, Germany
- Pszczyna, Poland
- Yountville, United States

== See also ==
- Dalmatia
- Split Airport

== Bibliography ==
=== History ===
- Milčetić, Ivan (1916). "Dva zaboravlena kńiževnika iz Kaštela" [Two Forgotten Writers from Kaštela]. Građa za povijest književnosti hrvatske (in Serbo-Croatian). 8: 181–204.
