= Kaštel Stari =

- Settlement
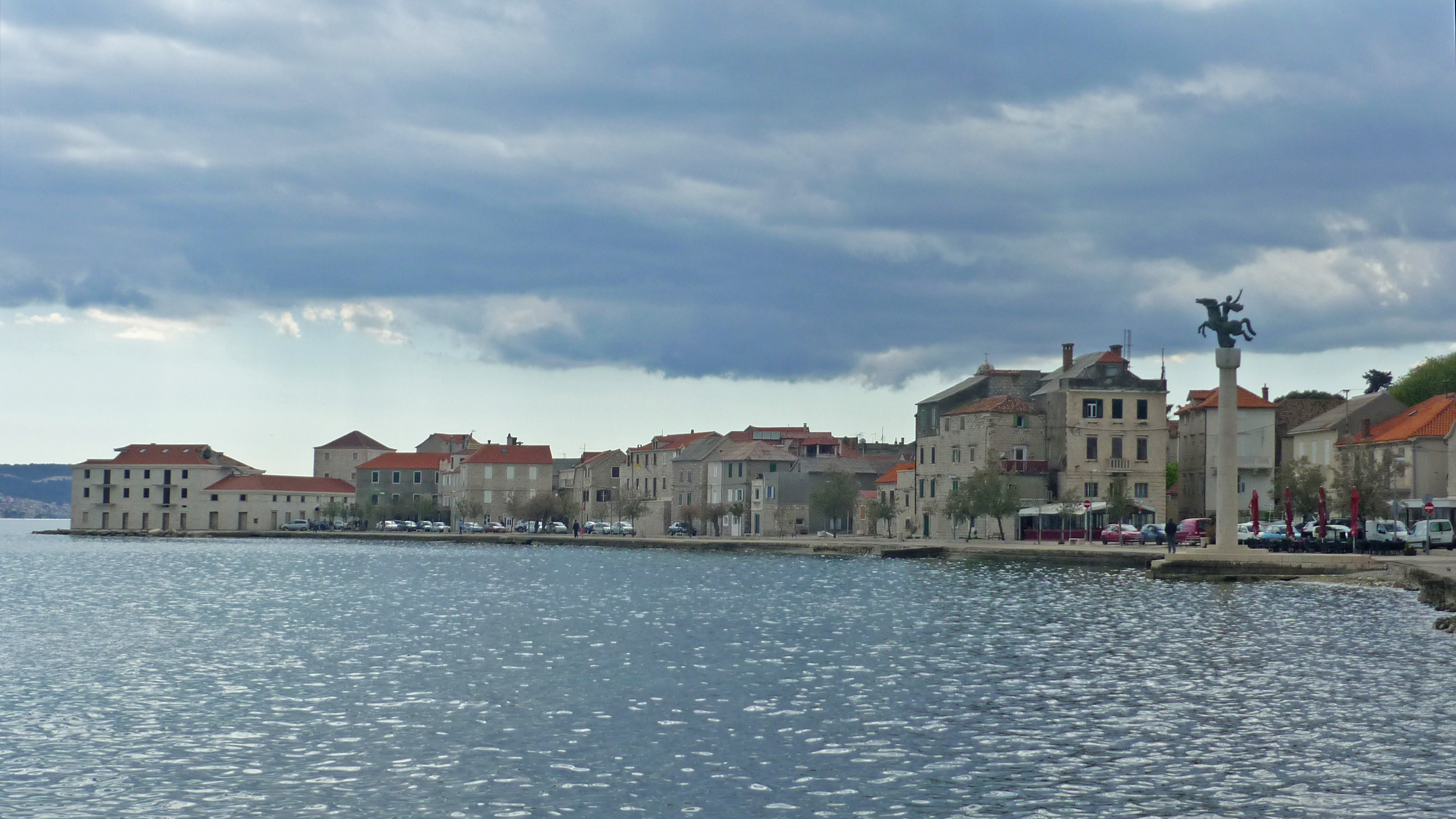
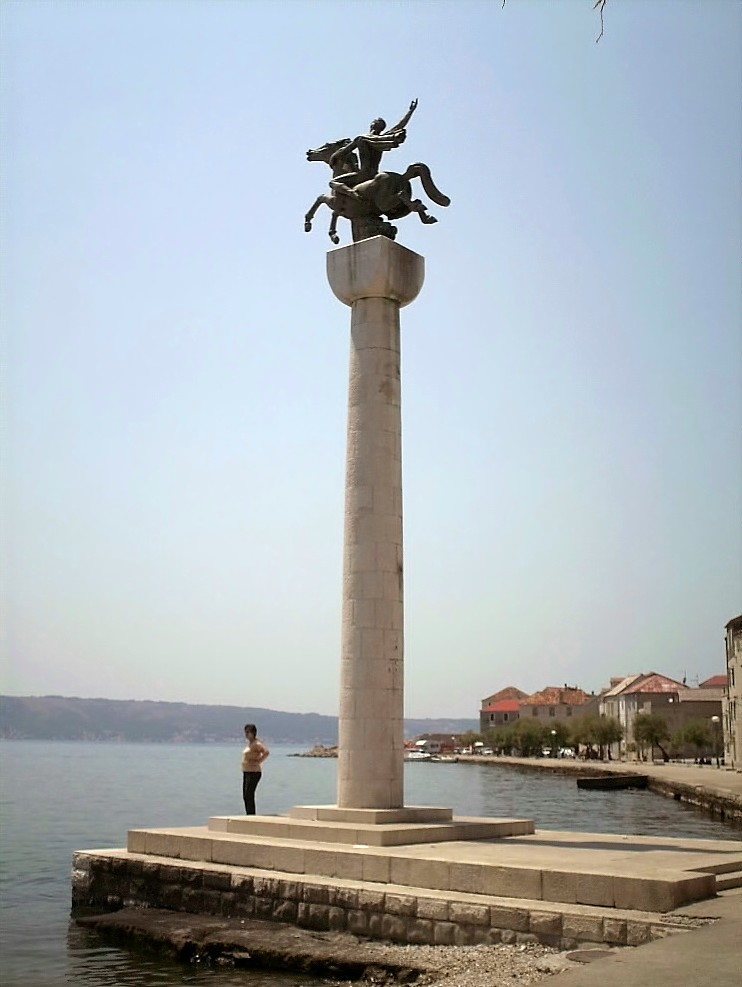
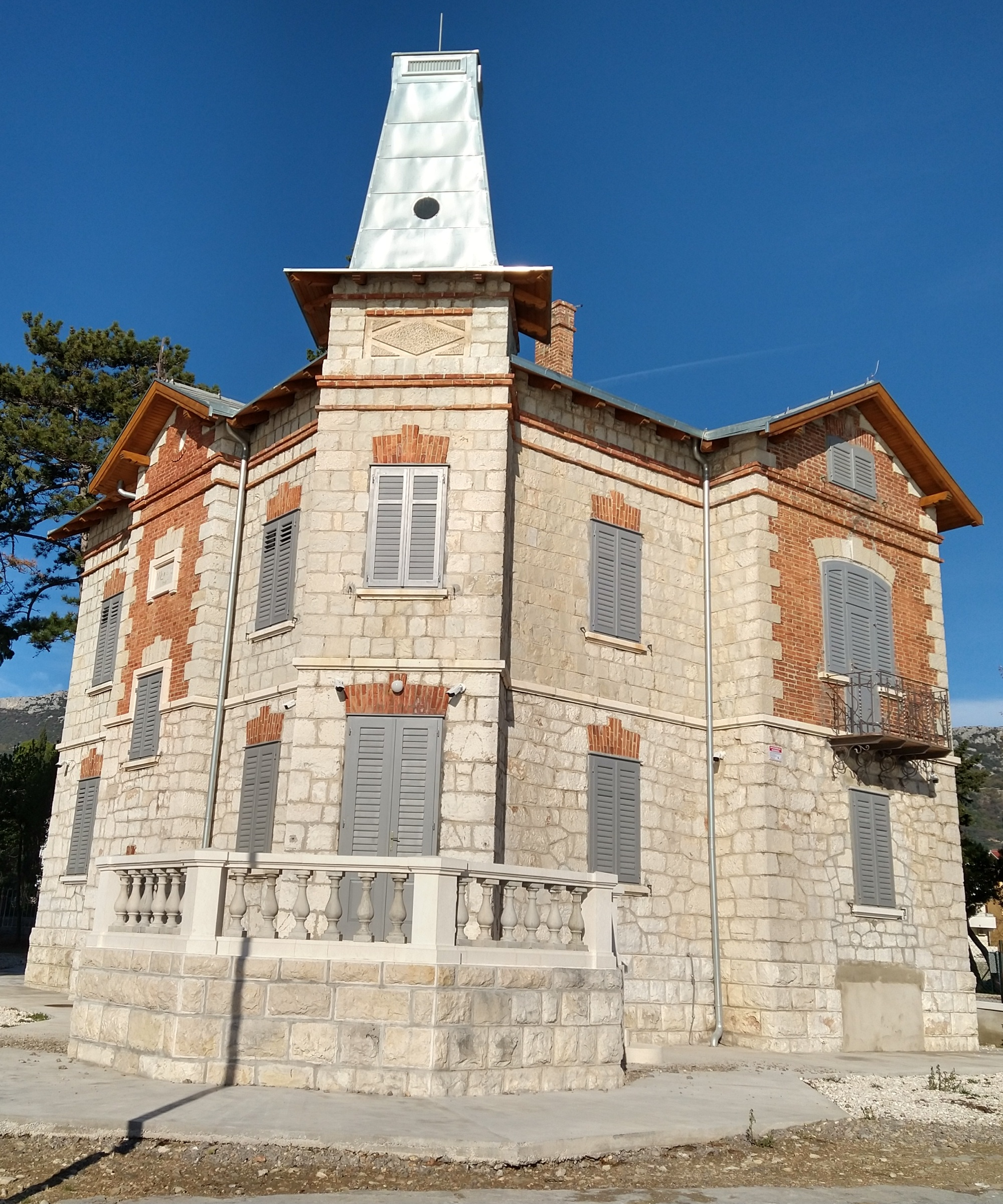
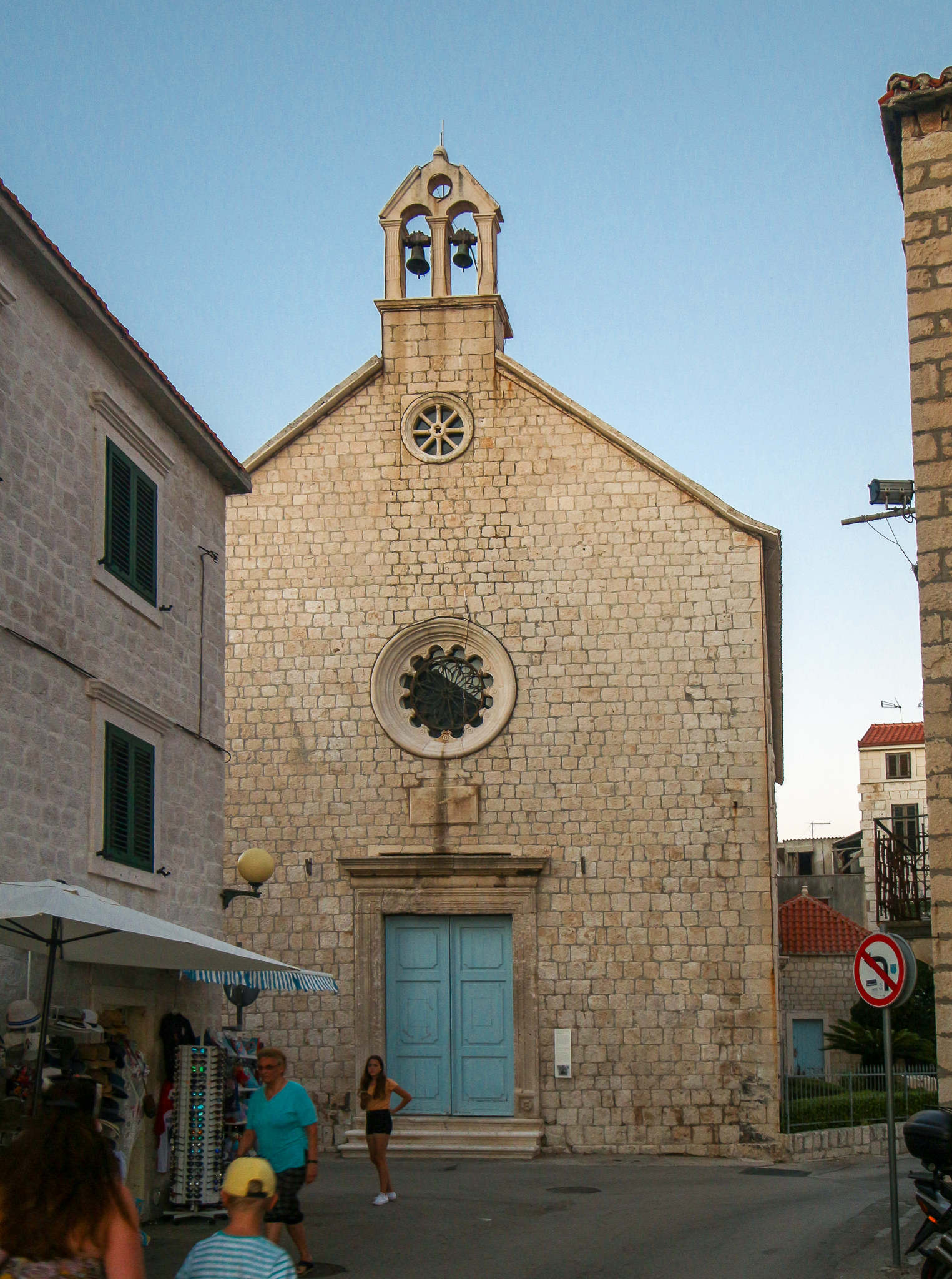
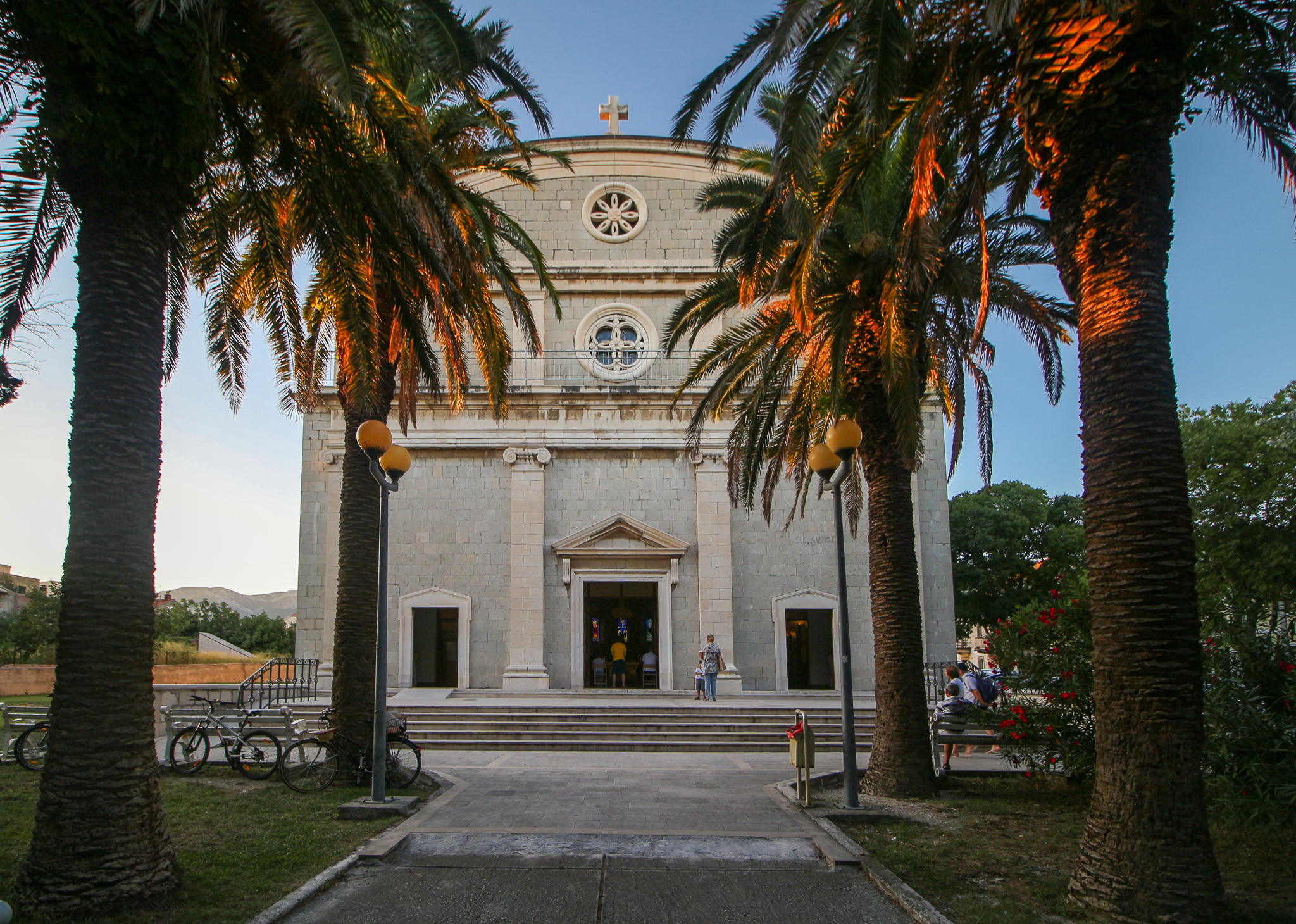
- Kaštel Stari sights

- Location within Croatia
- Coordinates: 43°33′N 16°21′E
- Country: Croatia
- County: Split-Dalmatia
- City: Kaštela

Area
  - Total: 6.5 km^{2} (2.5 sq mi)

Population (2021)
  - Total: 6,950
  - Density: 1,100/km^{2} (2,800/sq mi)
- Time zone: UTC+1 (CET)
  - Summer (DST): UTC+2 (CEST)

Kaštel Staris a settlement within the town of Kaštela in Dalmatia, Croatia.

Its name means Old Castle, this came from a nobleman from Trogir, Koriolan Cipiko, writer, humanist and military leader who built a mansion in 1476 which it is believed to have led to current name.

== History ==
History of the fortified village can be traced back to the fall of Bosnia in 1463, Dalmatia, which was at the time part of the Venetian Republic, faced danger from the Ottoman invaders. Following the fall of the fort at Klis in 1537 Kastela was exposed to frequent incursions. From the 15th century to 17th century local landowners, and noblemen established a series of fortified villages of which seven remain today. The historic core of Kastel Stari is made of three forts and a fortified village (citadel and fortified village Cippico, tower Celio-Cega and fortified Andreis house). Citadel Cippico was built on a rock in 1481 by Koriolan Cippico, a nobleman, humanist and warrior from Trogir. In 1507 he fortified land to the north by building defensive walls with towers on the corners in order to protect the houses of his farmers. Along with the lateral walls and streams as a defensive barrier. Following the end of the dangers the village spread outside of the walls and the area in front of the citadel was filled in on the side of the bridge. This is how Brce developed a village square with a flagpole column and well with drinking water. Along the eastern wall of the village was the Cippico family garden, on the northern side of the village stood a dyery. The baroque Chapel of St Joseph, which Lelije Cippico built in 1695 as a family chapel stands inside the village. Outside the fortified village of Koriolan Cippico, in front of its western gate stood the Parish Church of St John the Baptist built in 16th century which now has a church built in the 18th century. A new parish church (Our Lady of the Rosary)which began construction in 1871 is now at the northwest of the fortified village. West of the fortified village on the rocks two more forts were built:citadel Celio-Cega preserved until the present and the citadel of the Andreis family, nowadays hardly visible in the sea.

Local Interest

The Parish Church Our Lady of Rosary is one of the largest in Central Dalmatia. Constructed as a nave basilica it has a marble interior stretching 400m. The town also hosts (along with other towns in the area) a Carnival in February and during July and August the 'Kastela Cultural Summer Carnival' which includes exhibitions, music, sports and other events. There are a range of restaurants offering local and traditional dishes, there are also a range of apartments available to visitors during the summer.

The village has a daily market during the year selling local produce, flowers etc. in the 'Brce' (Square) and also hosts several festivals during the summer in the square or on the 'Riva' (Port side). These include the Fishermen's party in July, Victory Day in August and squid fishing in October. Kastela also organises and hosts concerts featuring locals singers and musicians, comedy shows etc . The local football team (HKN Kastel Stari) play at the edge of the village.

In January 2020 work commenced on a new marina and improvements to the Riva, the work is expected to continue through to the autumn of 2021.

== See also ==
- Kaštela
