= Kaštel Lukšić =

- Settlement
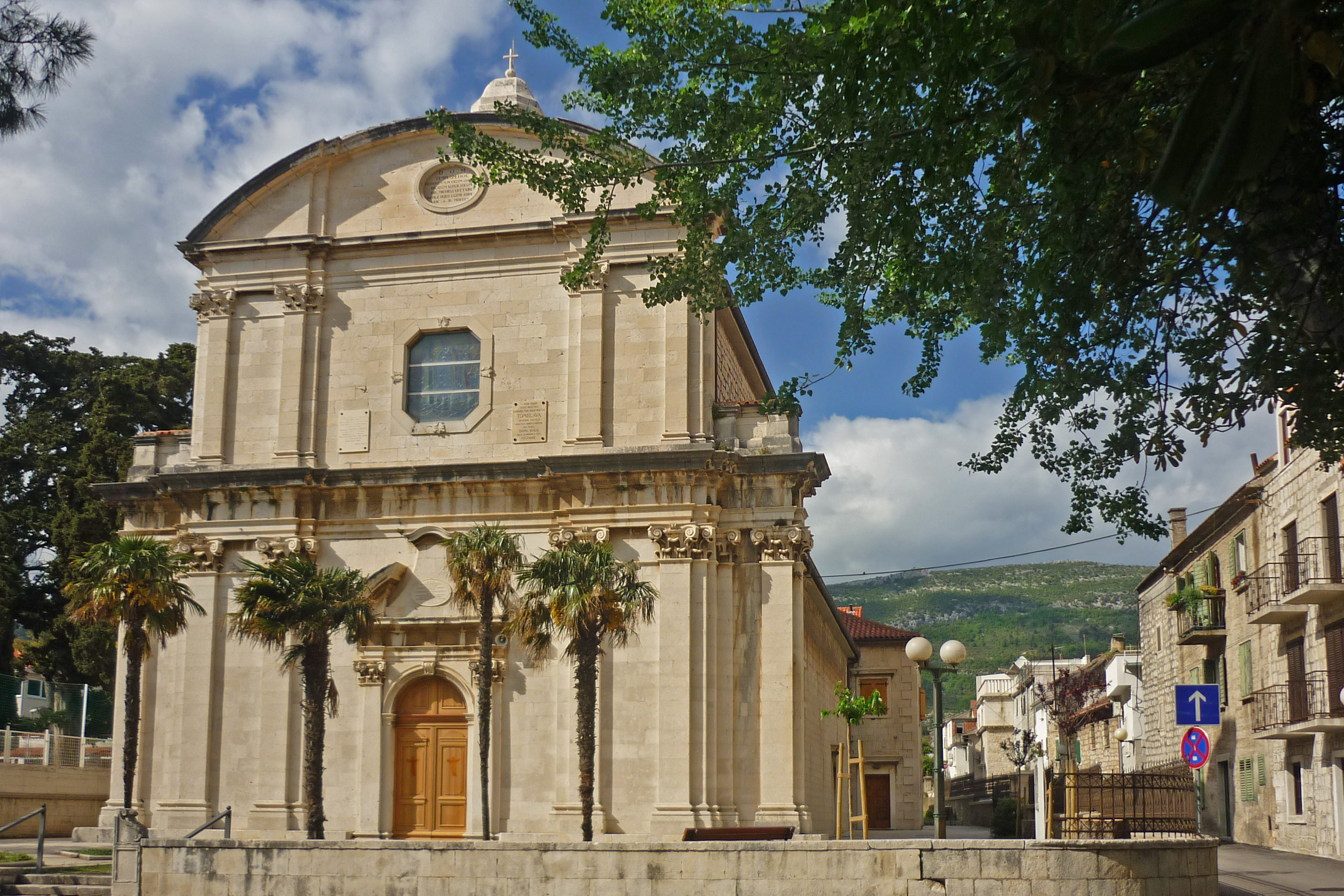
- Church of the Assumption of the Blessed Virgin Mary
- Interactive map of Kaštel Lukšić
- Location within Croatia
- Coordinates: 43°33′18″N 16°22′05″E
- Country: Croatia
- County: Split-Dalmatia
- City: Kaštela

Area
  - Total: 11.6 km^{2} (4.5 sq mi)

Population (2021)
  - Total: 5,221
  - Density: 450/km^{2} (1,170/sq mi)
- Time zone: UTC+1 (CET)
  - Summer (DST): UTC+2 (CEST)

Kaštel Lukšić is a settlement within the town of Kaštela in Dalmatia, Croatia.

== History ==
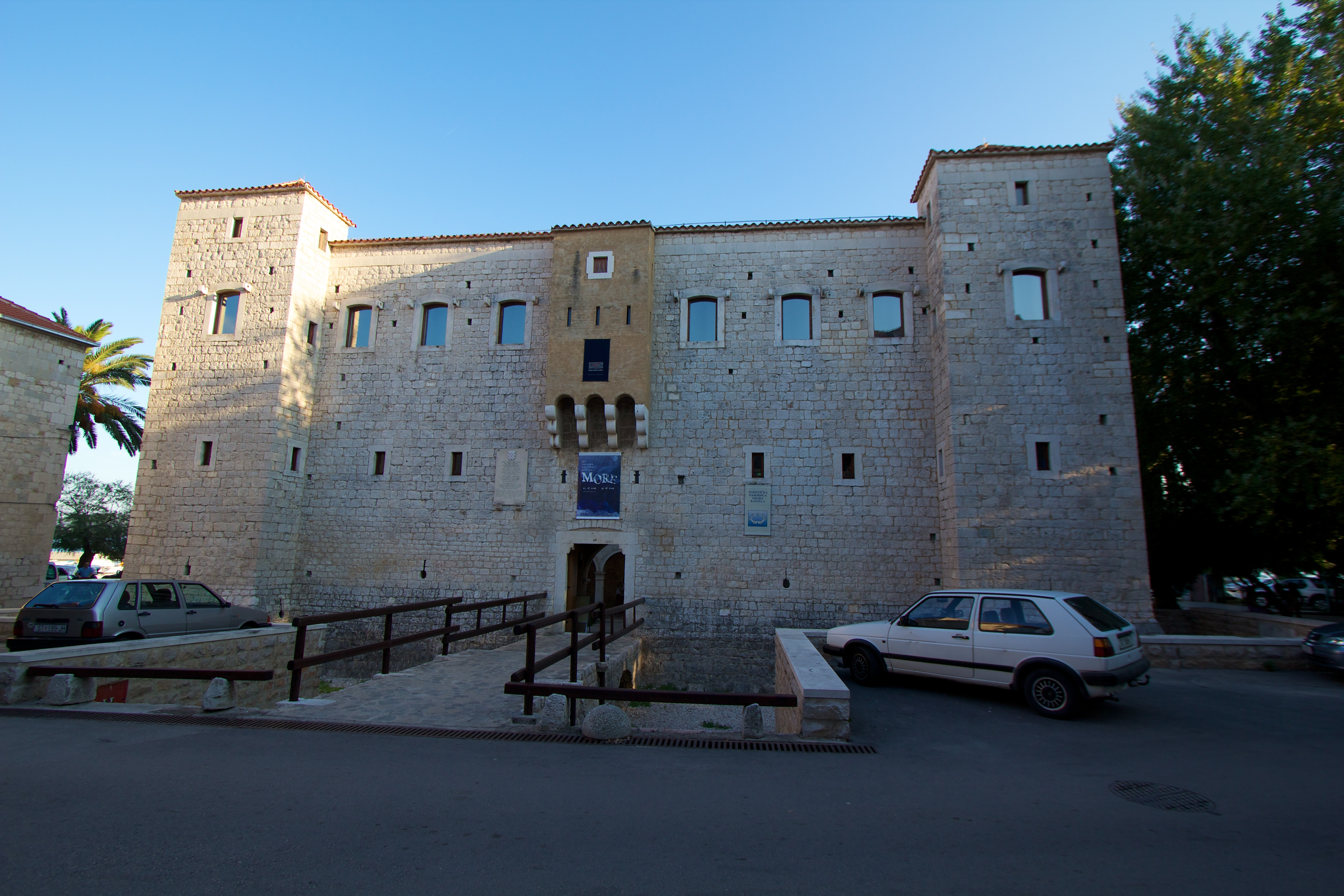
Vitturi Castle

Kaštel Lukšić was built as a castle (Vitturi Castle), by the aristocratic family Vitturi from Trogir, at the end of the 15th century. Kastel Luksic was originally renaissance residency with the inside yard and sea around, but later was connected with the mainland. Here is situated Kaštela Municipal Museum with permanent exhibition.

== Local interest ==
Monument of Horticultural & Architecture Vitturi-The town includes the first ever park which was erected by the Nobleman Rados Michell Vitturi in the second part of the 18th century. He was a renowned agricultural expert and President of the Agricultural Academy of Luksic. Since 1968 the park has been protected as a monument of horticultural architecture and culture, covering an area of over 9 hectares. Today the park includes features including aleppo pine, cypress and bay laurel as well as more established characteristics such as several exotic and rare samples of trees.
