= Piranch =

Piranch پيرانچ
- Village
- Location within Iran
- Coordinates: 27°22′47″N 60°47′33″E
- Country: Iran
- Province: Sistan and Baluchestan
- County: Iranshahr
- Bakhsh: Central
- Rural District: Damen

Population (2006)
  - Total: 1,130
- Time zone: UTC+3:30 (IRST)
  - Summer (DST): UTC+4:30 (IRDT)

Piranch (Persian: پيرانچ, also romanized as Pīrānch; also known as Bīranj, Pīranj, and Pīrūnj) is a village in Damen Rural District, in the Central District of Iranshahr County, Sistan and Baluchestan Province, Iran. At the 2006 census, its population was 1,130, in 192 families.
