= Kaštel Sućurac =

- Settlement
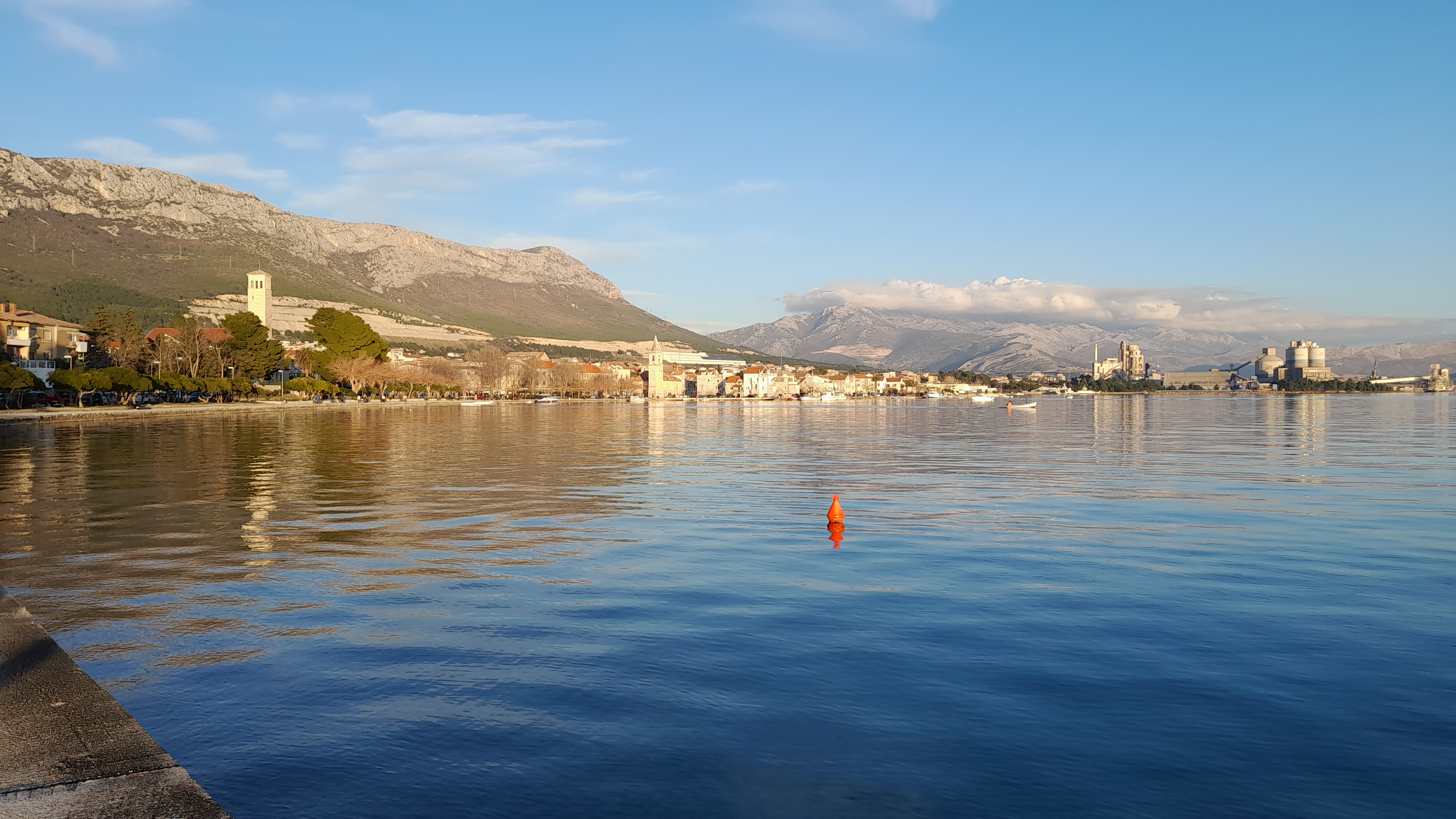
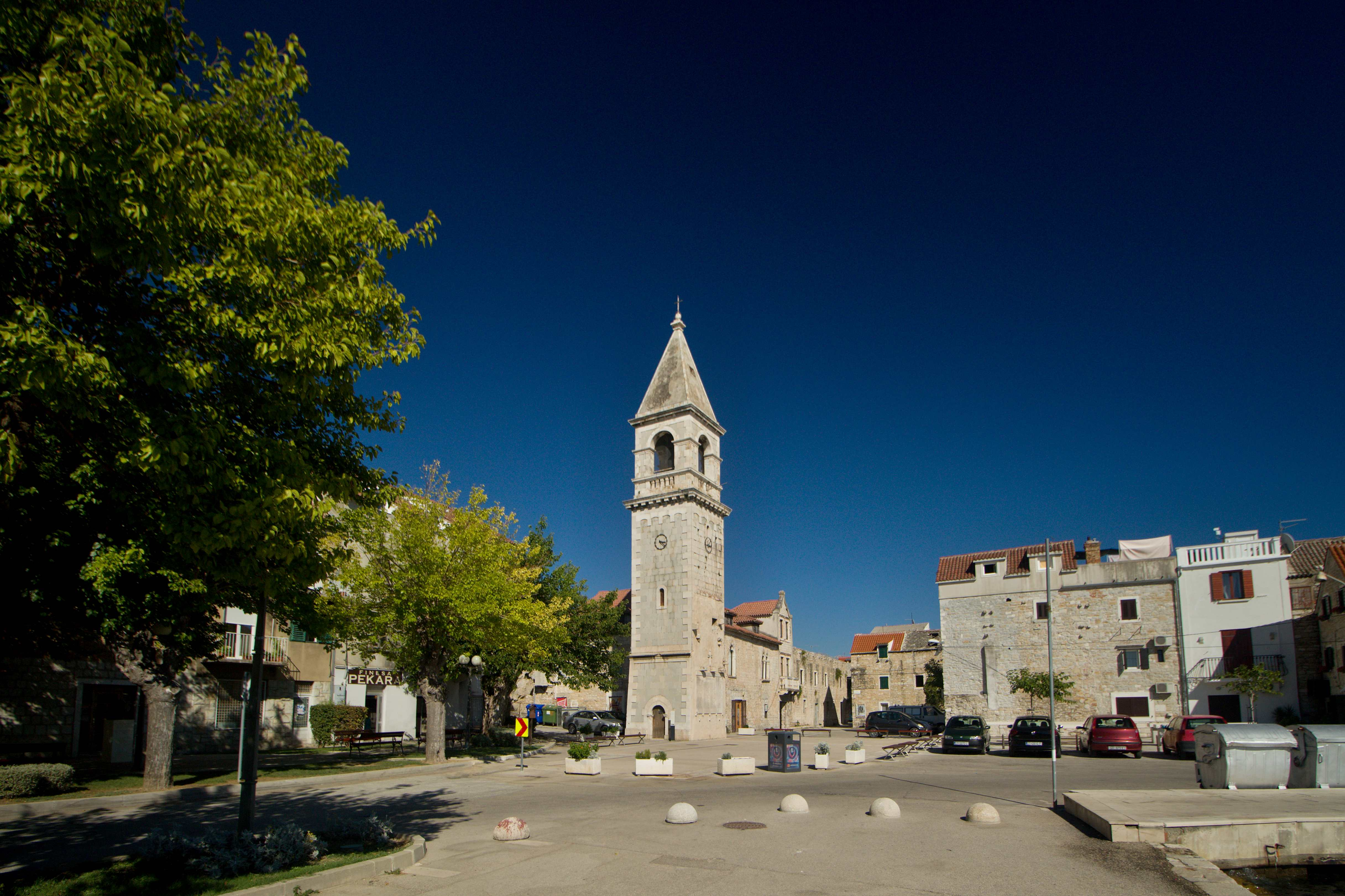
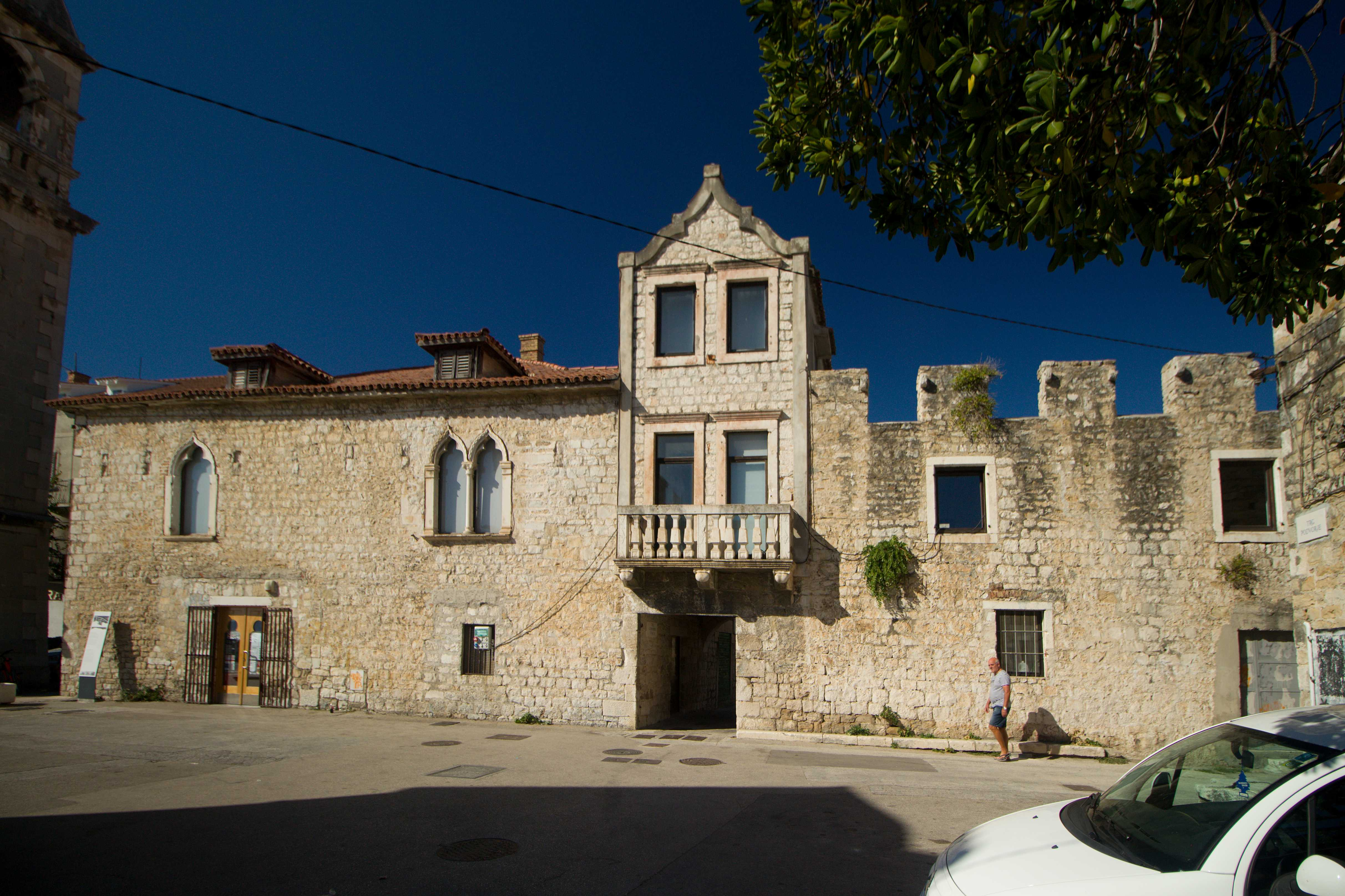
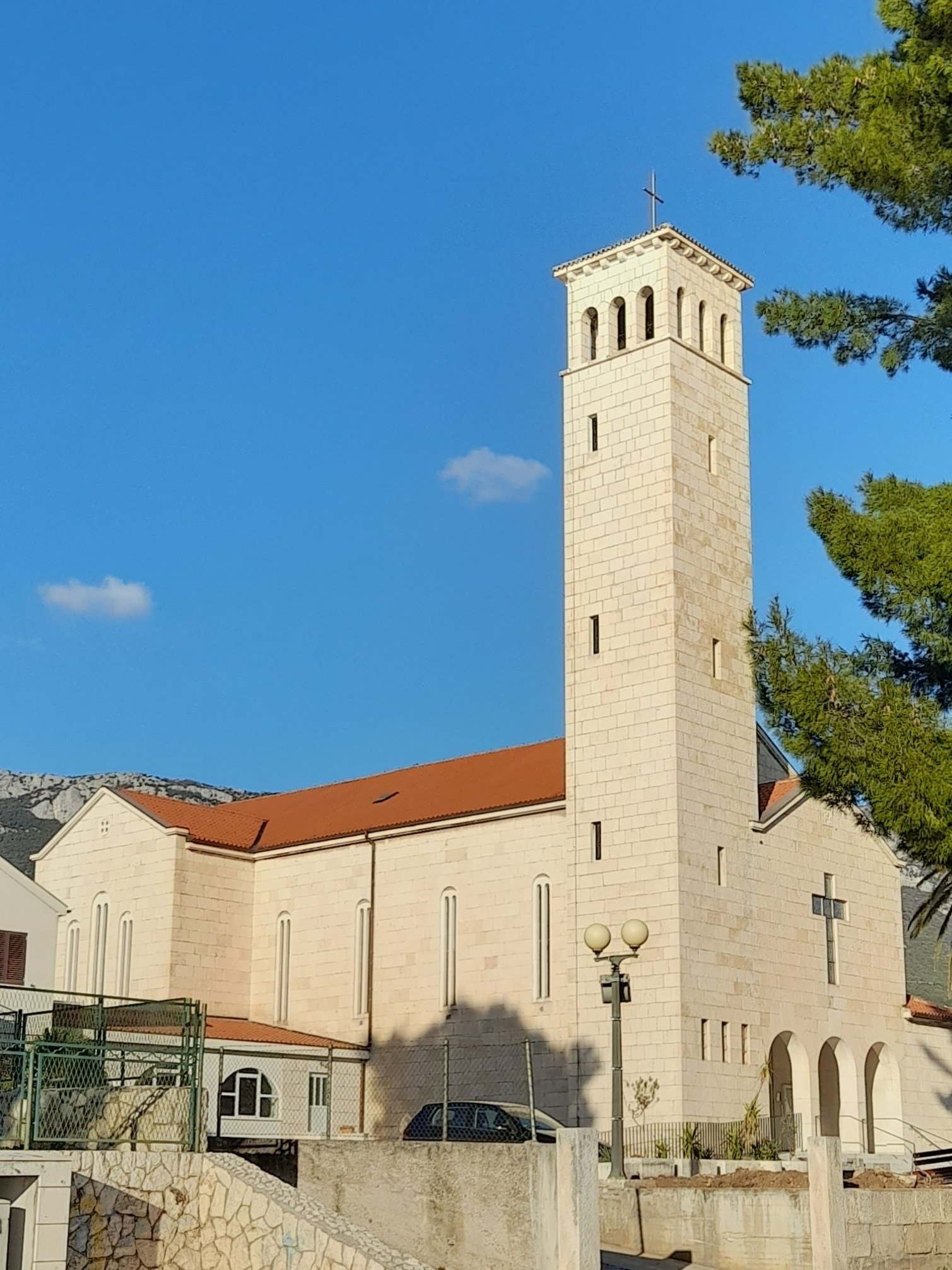
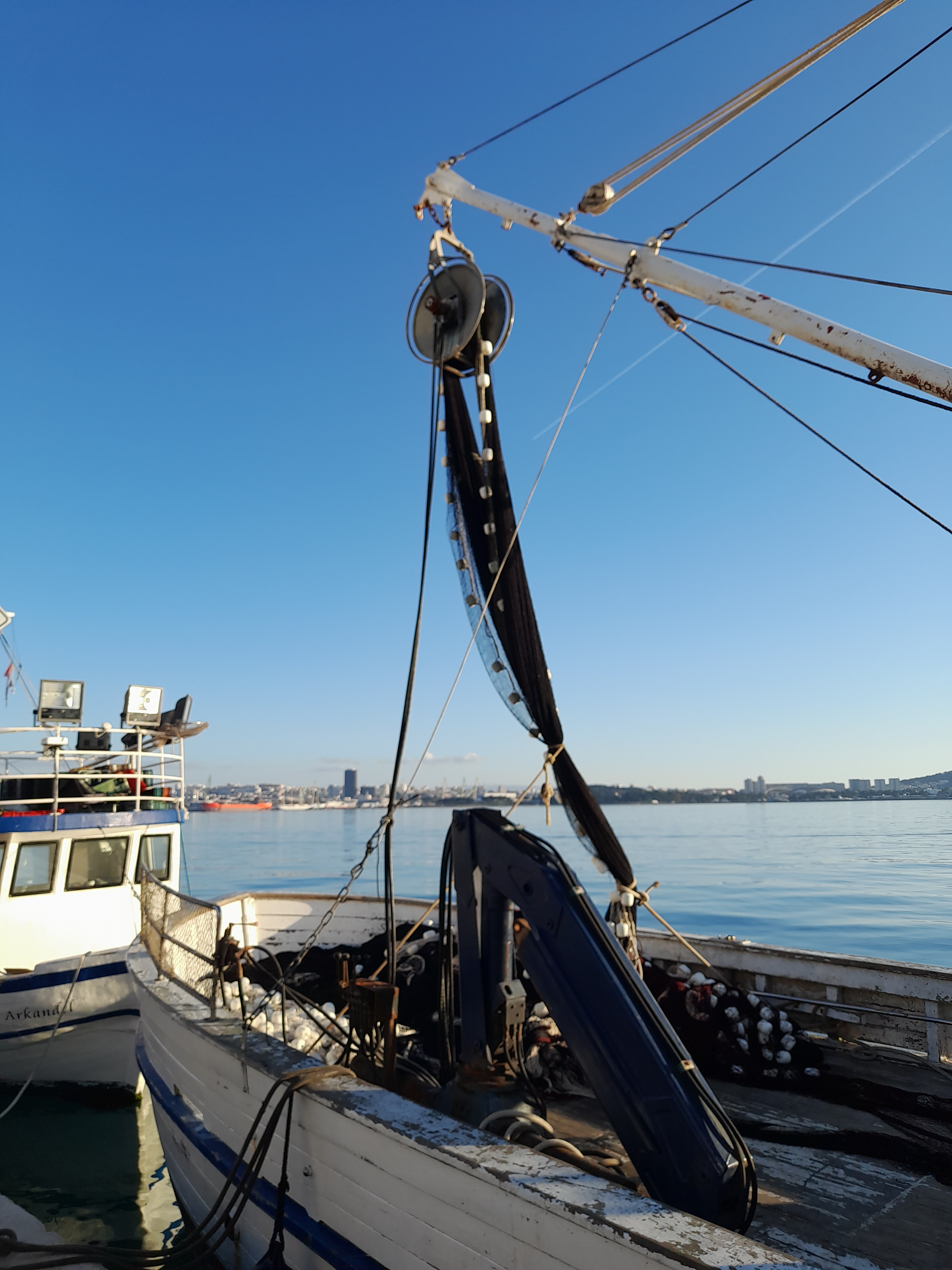
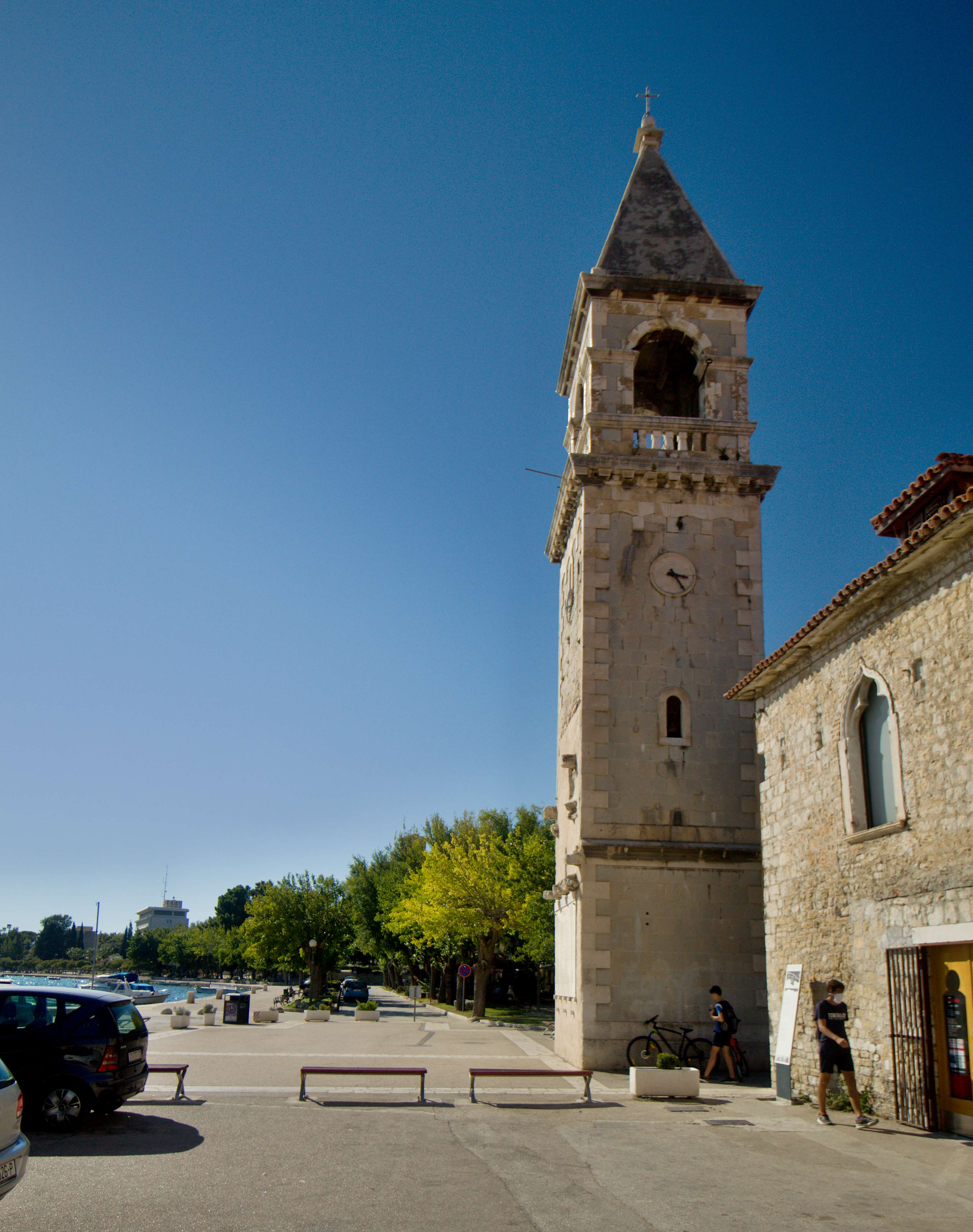
- Kaštel Sućurac sights

- Location within Croatia
- Coordinates: 43°33′00″N 16°25′34″E
- Country: Croatia
- County: Split-Dalmatia
- City: Kaštela

Area
  - Total: 11.2 km^{2} (4.3 sq mi)

Population (2021)
  - Total: 6,544
  - Density: 584/km^{2} (1,510/sq mi)
- Time zone: UTC+1 (CET)
  - Summer (DST): UTC+2 (CEST)
- Postal code: 21212 Kaštel Sućurac
- Area code: +385 (0)21

Kaštel Sućurac (pronounced [kǎʃtɛl sût͡ɕurat͡s]) is a settlement within the town of Kaštela in Dalmatia, Croatia. Kaštel Sućurac is the first of the 7 Kaštels from the East. Patron saint of the town is Saint George (Croatian: Sveti Jure).

== History ==
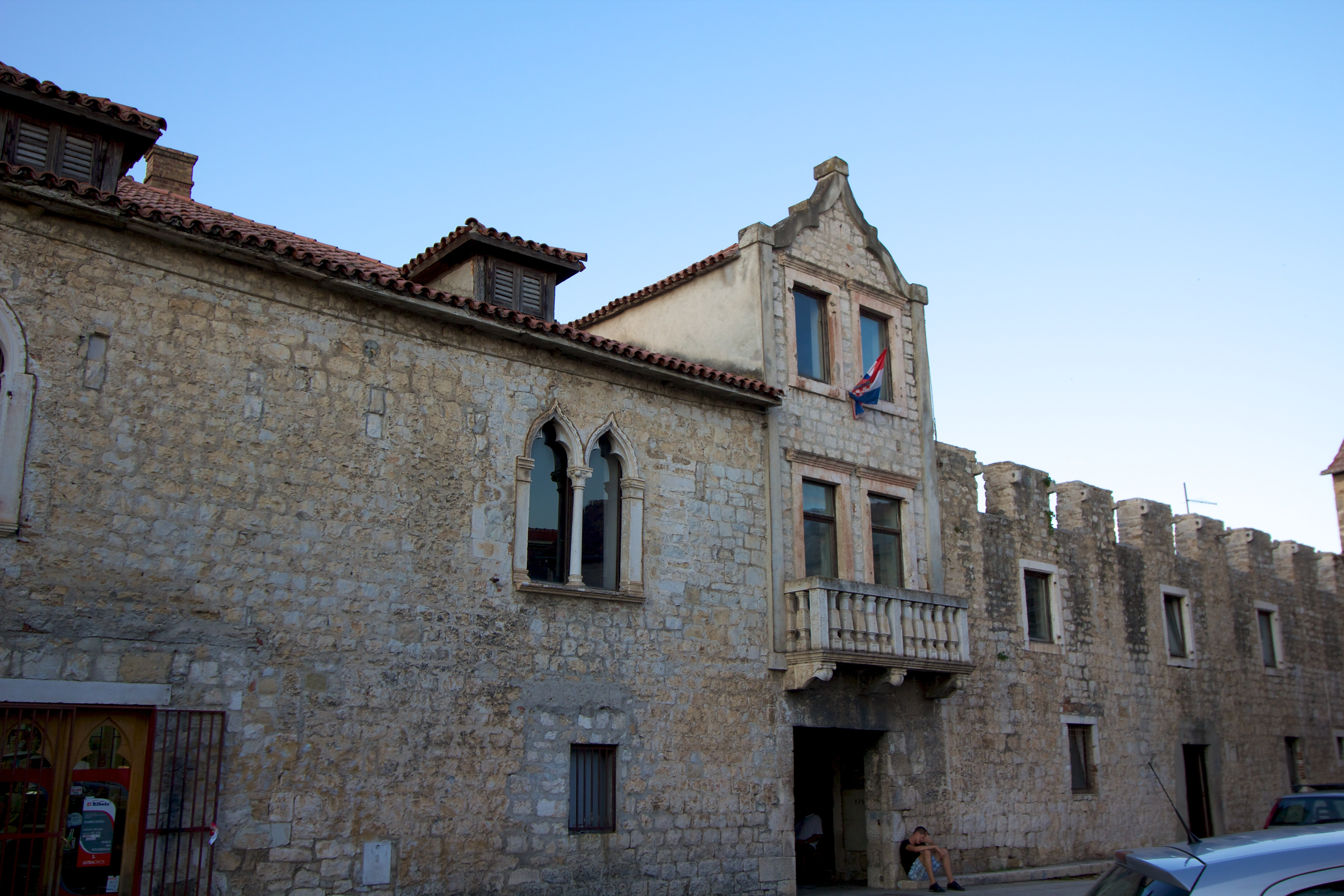
Bishop's Palace was built in the 15th century.

In Kaštel Sućurac the oldest defensive fortress was built in 1392 by A. Gvaldo, the Archbishop of Split, to protect the peasants from the settlement Putalj, which was situated on the slopes of Kozjak, near the little church of St. Juraj. Additional building formed a settlement by the sea.

Archbishop Averaldo built his summer residence in 1488, and castle gets its final form in 1509. The oldest center of Sućurac is Kaštilac, a yard of fortified palace – villa with the south wall opened by lavishly decorated windows in High Gothic style. Unlike other villages the square is here formed on the south side of the summer residence. Today, there is the exhibition room "Podvorje" where one part of archeological artifacts from Putalj is held.

Only the bell tower remained of the parish church built in the 16th century after Allied bombing in 1943. Kaštel Sućurac was bombed on 5 and 6 December 1943 by the Allies. In the attack, a parish church from the 16th century was destroyed, resulting in the deaths of 67 locals, including the parish's priest. On 13 December, another 38 were killed. In the communist Yugoslav era, the victims of the bombing were declared victims of fascism, which lasted until democratic changes in Croatia in 1990. In 2007 the town raised a monument to the victims.

== See also ==
- Diocletian's Palace
- Jadro River
- Solin
- Castle Rotondo
