= Brezovec, Croatia =

Brezovec
- Village
- Location within Croatia
- Coordinates: 46°31′20″N 16°21′11″E
- Country: Croatia
- County: Međimurje County
- Municipality: Sveti Martin na Muri

Area
  - Total: 1.5 km^{2} (0.58 sq mi)

Population (2021)
  - Total: 174
  - Density: 120/km^{2} (300/sq mi)
- Time zone: UTC+1 (CET)
  - Summer (DST): UTC+2 (CEST)
- Postal code: 40313 Sveti Martin na Muri

Brezovec is a village in northern Croatia, part of the Sveti Martin na Muri municipality within Međimurje County.

== History ==
Brezovec is first time mentioned in charter issued in year 1478 as Brezowecz.

== Geography ==
Brezovec is located in part of Međimurje called Gornje Međimurje. Village is about 20 kilometres northwest from Čakovec, and some 110 kilometres north of Zagreb. Settlement is situated in the alluvial plane of river Mur, on rivers right bank.

Brezovec had a population of 197 in 2011 census.

Historical population

Year	Pop.	±%
1921	141	—
1931	136	−3.5%
1948	143	+5.1%
1953	148	+3.5%
1961	200	+35.1%

Year	Pop.	±%
1971	231	+15.5%
1981	171	−26.0%
1991	203	+18.7%
2001	211	+3.9%
2011	197	−6.6%
