= Vrhovljan =

- Village
- Location within Croatia
- Coordinates: 46°31′37″N 16°22′30″E
- Country: Croatia
- County: Međimurje County
- Municipality: Sveti Martin na Muri

Area
  - Total: 1.5 km^{2} (0.58 sq mi)

Population (2021)
  - Total: 260
  - Density: 170/km^{2} (450/sq mi)
- Time zone: UTC+1 (CET)
  - Summer (DST): UTC+2 (CEST)
- Postal code: 40313 Sveti Martin na Muri

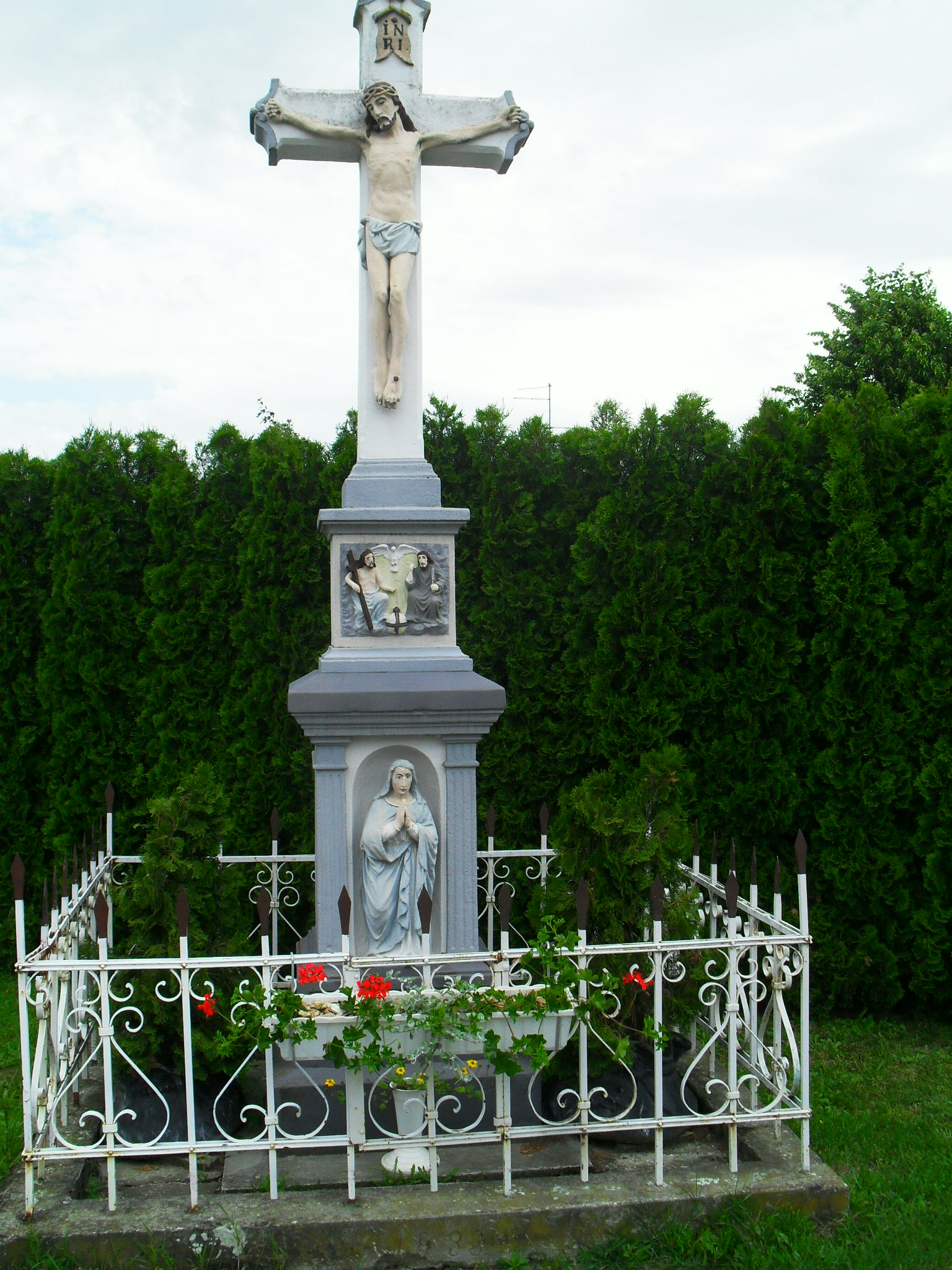
Crucifix with Kajkavian (kajkavaski) inscription from 1835 in Vrhovljan

Vrhovljan (Hungarian: Ormos) is a village in northern Croatia, part of the Sveti Martin na Muri municipality within Međimurje County.

== History ==
Vrhovljan is first time mentioned in charter issued in year 1478 as Worhoblan. Roman Catholic chapel in Vrhovljan was built in the 1830s.

== Geography ==
Vrhovljan is located in part of Međimurje called Gornje Međimurje. Village is about 18 kilometres northwest from Čakovec, and some 110 kilometres north of Zagreb. Settlement is situated in the alluvial plane of river Mur, on rivers right bank.

Vrhovljan had a population of 291 in the 2011 census. The village has been experiencing population decline since the 2000s.

Historical population

Year	Pop.	±%
1921	181	—
1931	196	+8.3%
1948	238	+21.4%
1953	247	+3.8%
1961	253	+2.4%

Year	Pop.	±%
1971	323	+27.7%
1981	311	−3.7%
1991	342	+10.0%
2001	336	−1.8%
2011	291	−13.4%

== Economy ==
In Vrhovljan there is an industrial area with 13 companies, mainly operating in the metal industry.
