= Vučkovec =

- Mineral spring
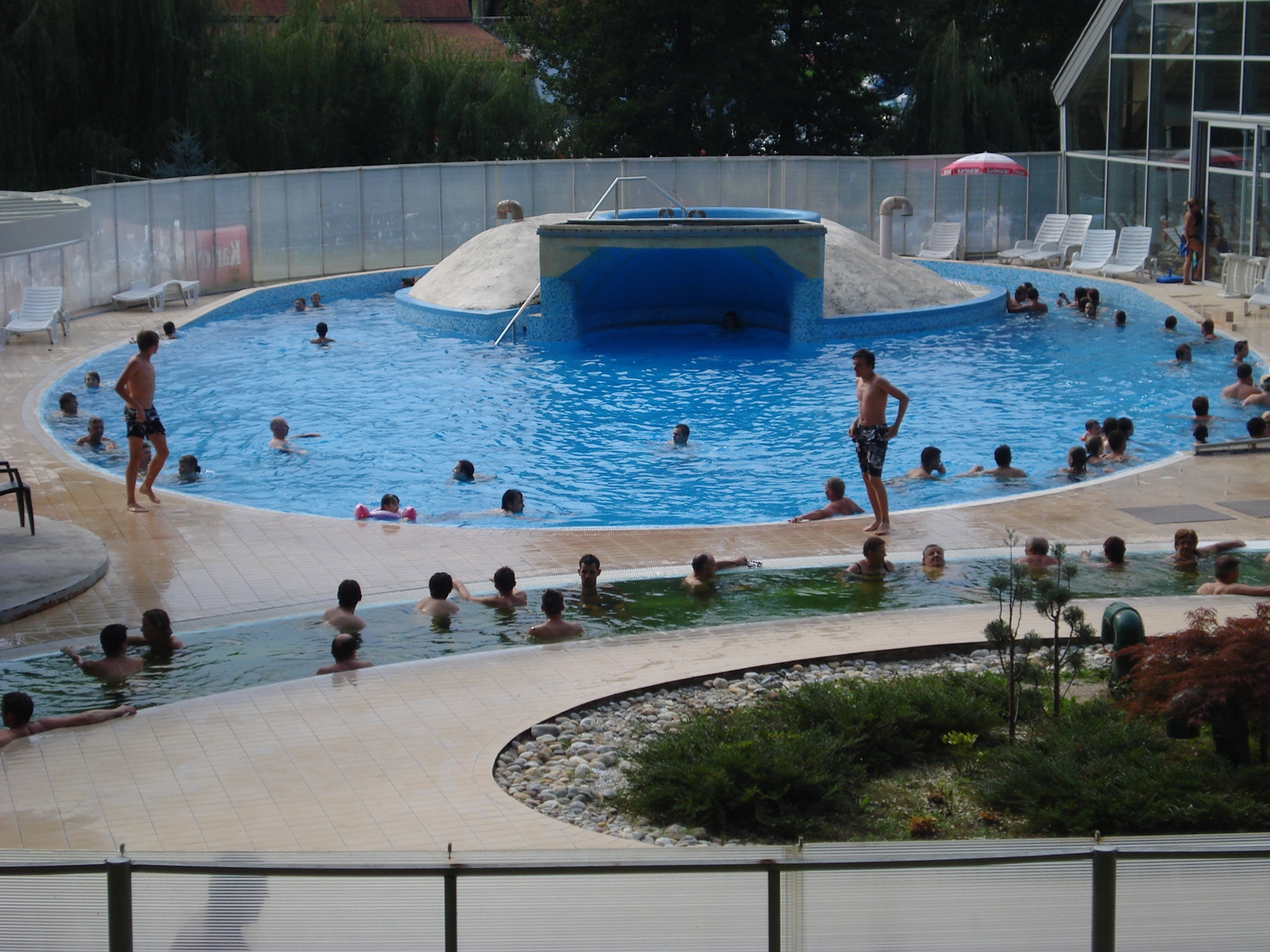
- The healing power of the mineral water used to treat patients and other users
- Interactive map of Vučkovec
- Coordinates: 46°30.0′N 16°20.0′E
- Country: Croatia
- County: Međimurje

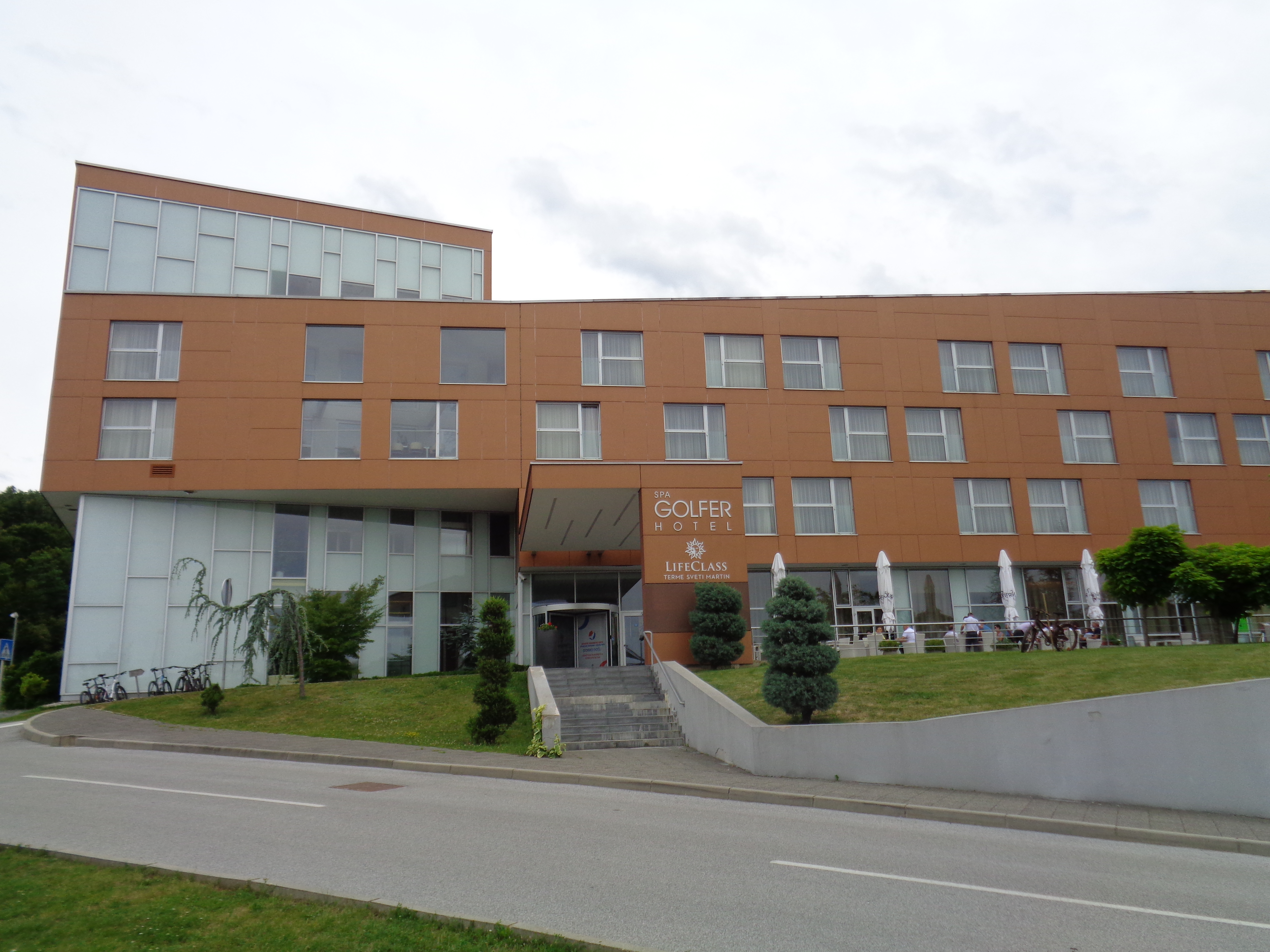
The new four-star "Spa Golfer Hotel" hosts conferences, workshops, sportsmen etc.

Vučkovec is a mineral spring in Međimurje County, northern Croatia, which from the early twentieth century served as the focus of a small resort community.

The healing power of the warm mineral water was known to local inhabitants living near the Vučkovec locality from the very beginning. The spring water showed measured temperature between 33 °C and 34 °C, remarkable balneological factors, high level of mineralization and presence of carbon dioxide.

== History ==
In the mid-1930s, Josip Kraljić, a businessman from the 15-kilometer-distant town of Čakovec, developed the resort at the location by building the first swimming pool. At the same time he established a bottle filling section for bottled drinking mineral water called "Vučkovec – mineral spring of Medjimurje", that functioned until the Second World War. After the War the facility was nationalized and suffered stagnation.

New development occurred in 1996, after the Croatian War of Independence, as the whole area was included into a new-formed Sveti Martin na Muri municipality. Vučkovec was bought by the firm "Modeks" Inc. from the neighboring town of Mursko Središće and named "Toplice Vučkovec" (English: Vuchkovets Spa). A new swimming pool was bui, dressing room, restaurant, and other supporting facilities were built.

In 2003, a new company, Toplice Sveti Martin Ltd., took over the location with all existing equipment and did further development, investing in a new open-air and an indoor swimming pool, saunas, sunbeds, golf playgrounds and a new four-star hotel.

Besides the mineral spring, the name Vučkovec has been used for the neighbouring gas exploitation field, as well as for the water retention dam on the rambling Gradiščak brook, built for flood protection.
