= Halikan =

- Halicanum, Halycanum, Alicanum
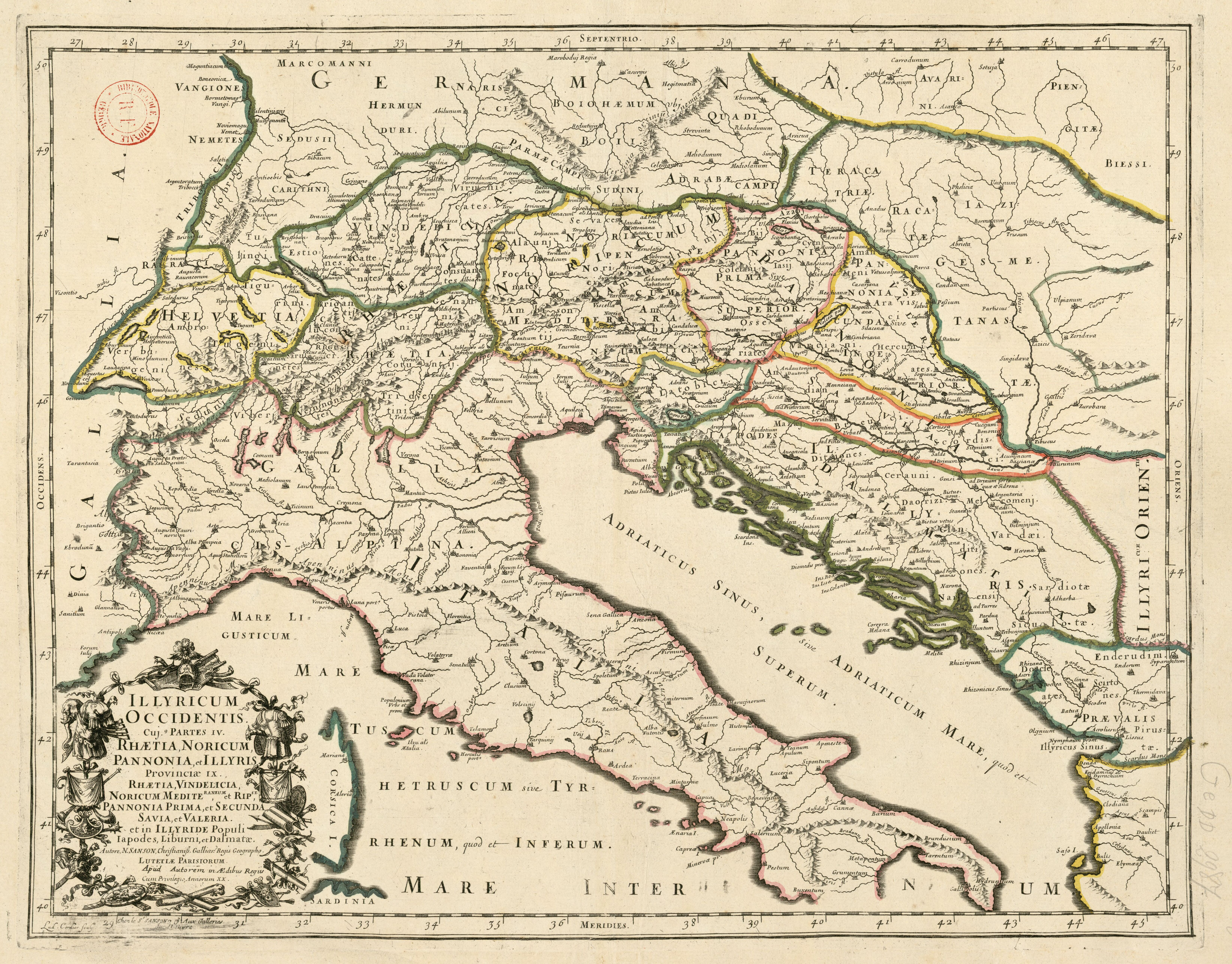
- Halikan (Halicanum) within Pannonia Superior on a 17th-century map showing several ancient Roman provinces

- Location within Croatia
- 46.53°N 16.38°E
- Type: Municipium
- Periods: Classical antiquity
- Cultures: Roman
- Associated with: Roman citizens
- Location: Croatia
- Region: Međimurje
- Part of: Roman Empire

History
- Built: 1st century

Site notes
- Excavation dates: 1977–2018
- Management: Međimurje County Museum

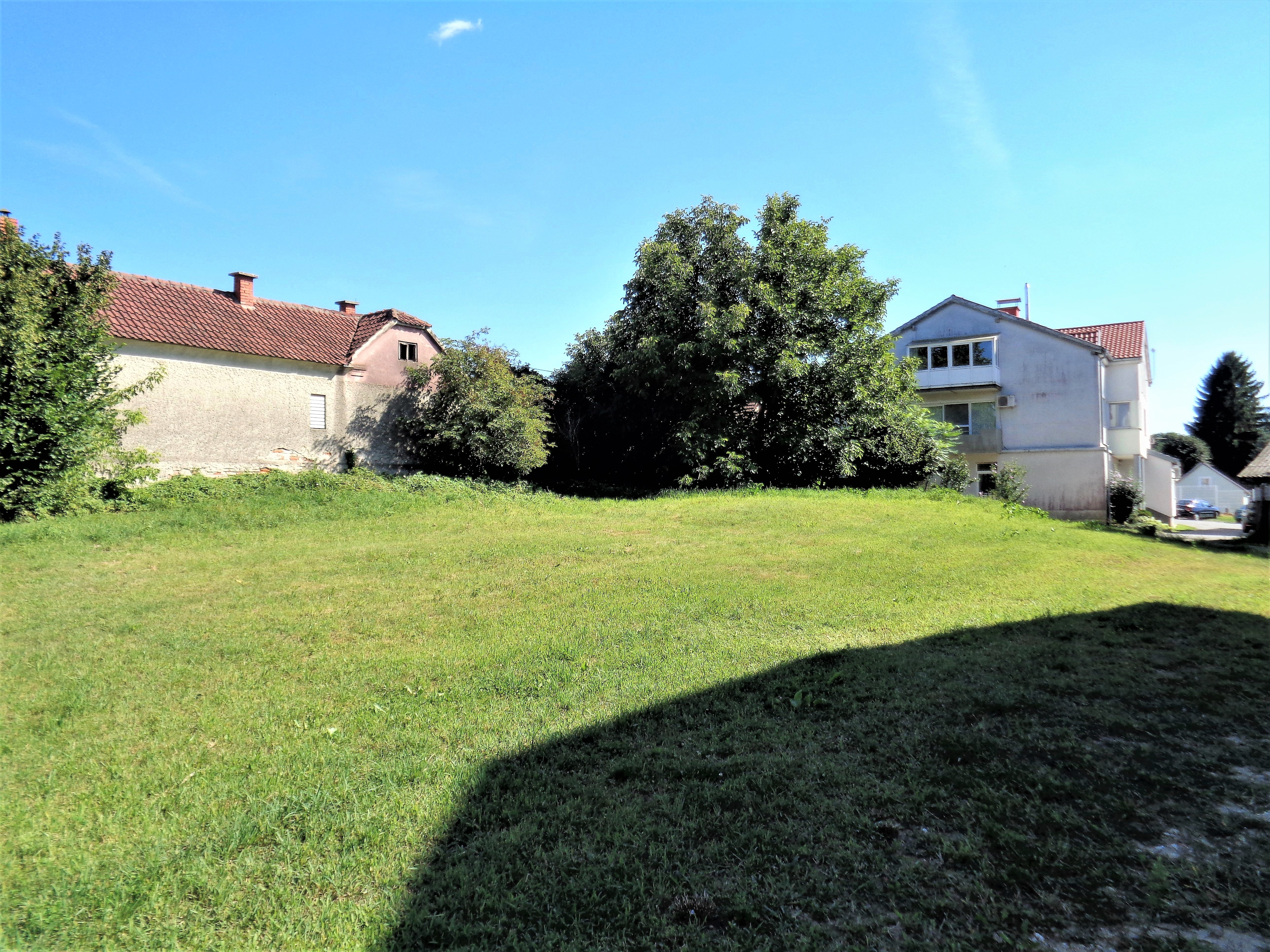
Halicanum site in Sveti Martin na Muri, northern Croatia

Halikan (Latin: Halicanum, Halycanum, Alicanum) is an ancient Roman municipium located in present-day Croatia. It is situated in the municipality of Sveti Martin na Muri in Međimurje County. Founded in the 1st century AD, the municipium had an area of about 3 square kilometres and was a square in ground plan. An ancient Roman road passed by it, having led from Aquileia through the cities of Aemona and Poetovio - today's Ljubljana and Ptuj in Slovenia - to the east and north, forking near Halican in the direction of Carnuntum, a settlement east of modern-day Vienna in Austria, and Aquincum, today's Budapest. The site has been more thoroughly investigated archaeologically since 1977, but recently it was interrupted, and for the sake of protection and restoration, the site was closed.

== History ==
Halikan was an important ancient Roman settlement that quite surely had the status of a municipium at the time of Emperor Hadrian (ruled 117 - 138 AD), as evidenced by the discovery of two well-preserved Roman denarii (silver coins) with his image, a type of money which value was behind the aureus (gold coin), and ahead of the brass sestertius and the copper as.

The settlement was established in the 1st century AD, or perhaps a little earlier, during the early conquests of Emperor Octavian Augustus (ruled 27 BC - 14 AD). It gained town status most likely during the process of urbanization of parts of the Pannonia province at the time of the reign of Emperor Vespasian (ruled 69 - 79 AD). The wider area was already inhabited earlier by members of the Pannonian tribes, and on the Mura river there was a suitable crossing over that river from one bank to the other. The Romans noticed this and established a military stronghold to monitor the river crossing. Over the time, the settlement developed so much that it became some kind of commercial centre of the surrounding area.

The town itself had a regular square shape, more precisely the shape of a square (so-called "urbs quadrata") with traffic routes in an orthogonal system, where the streets intersect at right angles. Archaeological researches have shown that Halikan had town quarters (insulae) and a forum, the main square.

The municipium flourished until the middle of the 3rd century AD, spreading the ancient Roman culture and way of life to the surrounding area. With the weakening of the Roman Empire and the subsequent settling of Slavs, Halikan lost its significance, and finally found itself deeply covered with soil.

== Archaeological findings ==
The archaeological research of Halikan was systematically started by archaeologists of the Međimurje County Museum from Čakovec in 1977. Ancient building material (bricks, tiles, stone pillar base, parts of building walls, parts of plaster, etc.) was immediately found, which indicated that there had been a Roman settlement. A pottery furnace and troughs for compacting clay were found among the first finds. The Ara (altar) of the Roman benefactor consul Titus Cesernius Marcilinus, which was dedicated to the supreme god Jupiter, is among the most important discoveries in the territory of the municipium. It indicates that Halikan was an important trading center.

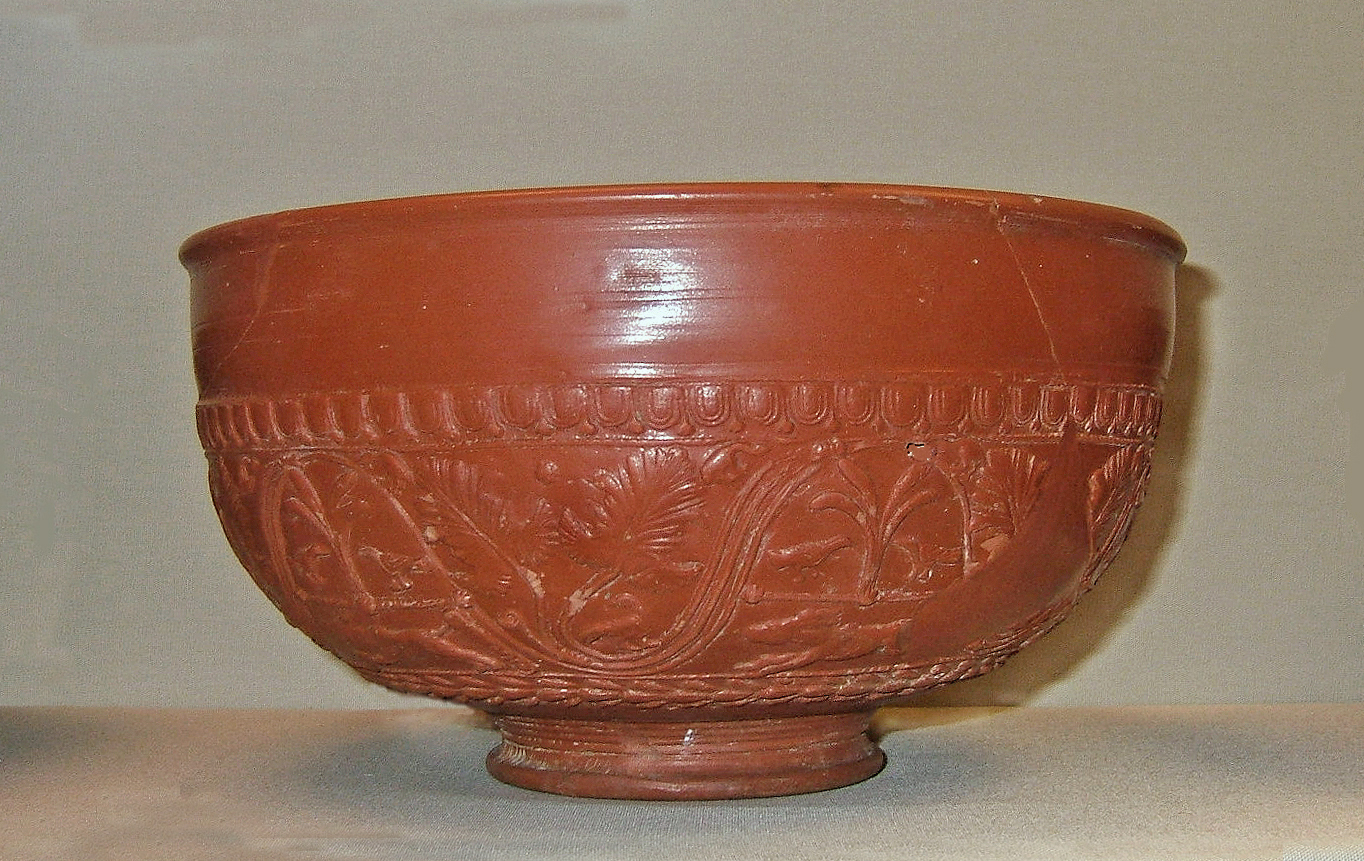
A bowl made in the technique of fine ceramics called "terra sigillata" (=sealed earth), similar to those excavated in Halikan

During further excavations some other finds were discovered, e. g. necropolis tumuli (burial mounds) along the ancient road that led to Halikan, a number of clay artifacts (plates, bowls, oil lamps, pots etc.), as well as several pottery kilns for items for everyday use. Artifacts belonging to the fine, luxurious ceramics of reddish color called terra sigillata (Lat. terra sigillata="sealed earth") were not made in Halican, but delivered from more distant areas of the Roman Empire (e. g. Apennine Peninsula and the province of Gaul (Latin: Gallia) – today's France). It was produced using a special technique from purified clay extracted from deposits rich in iron oxide.

Among other types of finds, numerous metallic artifacts were excavated, such as bronze and iron arrows, parts of iron knives, pewter and bronze sleigh bells, iron and bronze keys, silver and bronze clips (fibulae), bronze needles and pins, bronze tweezers, iron nails, then part of a glass bottle with a handle, and many others.

In 1985, research was reduced and later temporarily stopped completely. It was only in 2002 that they were continued, and it was undoubtedly defined that this ancient Roman settlement had a particularly developed pottery activity, including the firing of clay products. Research was more intensive between 2015 and 2018, as the archaeologists tried to determine dimensions of the ancient town. After that the site has been closed.

== See also ==
- Andautonia
- Aquae Iasae
- Stridon
