= Čestijanec =

- Village
- Location within Croatia
- Coordinates: 46°31′17″N 16°19′40″E
- Country: Croatia
- County: Međimurje County
- Municipality: Sveti Martin na Muri

Area
  - Total: 1.4 km^{2} (0.54 sq mi)

Population (2021)
  - Total: 91
  - Density: 65/km^{2} (170/sq mi)
- Time zone: UTC+1 (CET)
  - Summer (DST): UTC+2 (CEST)
- Postal code: 40313 Sveti Martin na Muri

Čestijanec is a village in northern Croatia, part of the Sveti Martin na Muri municipality within Međimurje County.

== Geography ==
Čestijanec is located in part of Međimurje called Gornje Međimurje. Village is about 22 kilometres northwest from Čakovec, and some 110 kilometres north of Zagreb. Settlement is situated in the alluvial plane of river Mur, on rivers right bank.

Čestijanec had a population of 114 in 2011 census.
