= Sveti Martin na Muri =

- Municipality
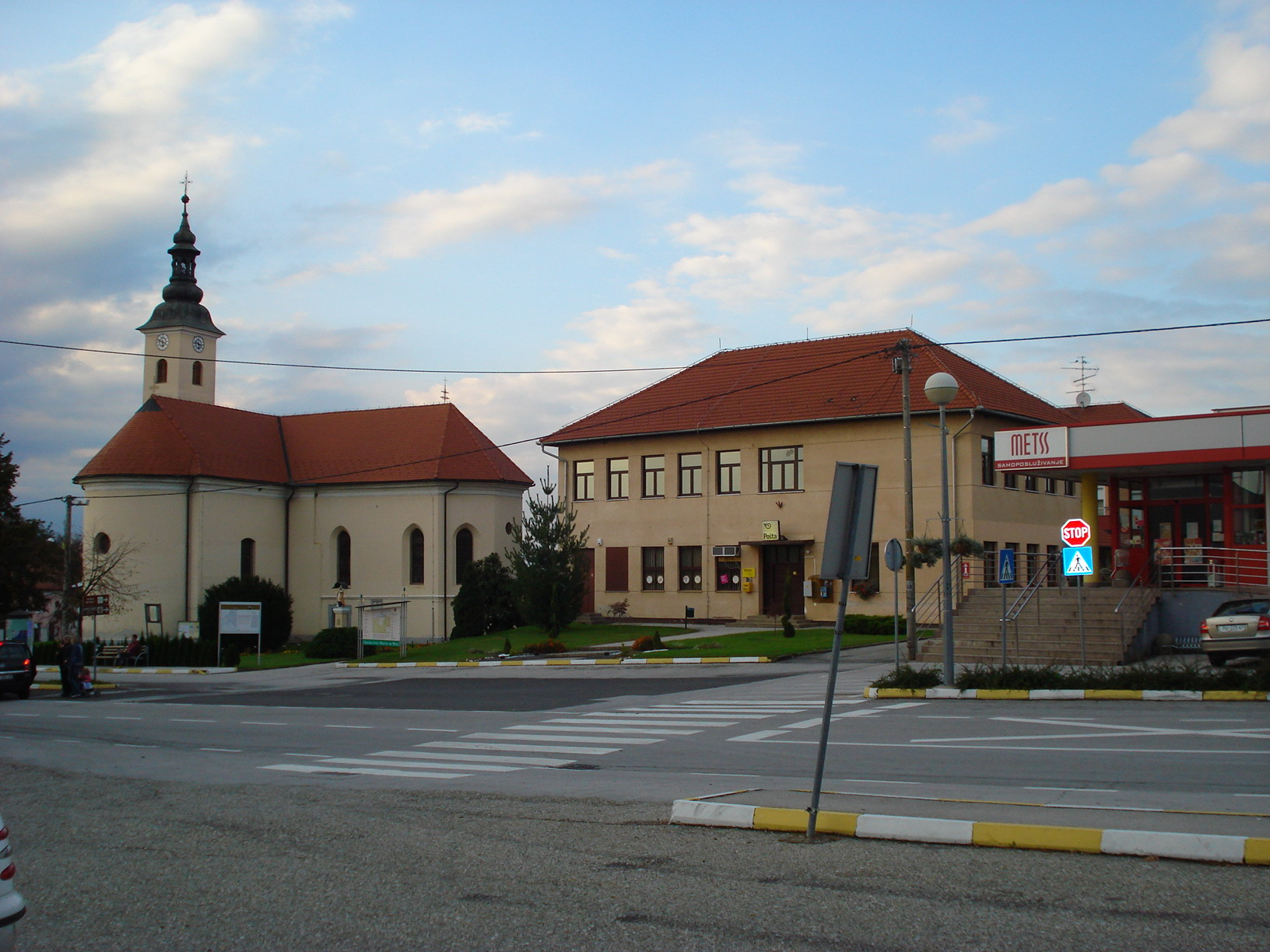
- Village centre

- Location within Croatia
- Coordinates: 46°32′N 16°23′E
- Country: Croatia
- Region: Northern Croatia (Međimurje)
- County: Međimurje County

Government
  - Municipal mayor: Martin Srša (Independent)

Area
  - Municipality: 25.3 km^{2} (9.8 sq mi)
  - Urban: 3.3 km^{2} (1.3 sq mi)

Population (2021)
  - Municipality: 2,391
  - Density: 94.5/km^{2} (245/sq mi)
  - Urban: 452
  - Urban density: 140/km^{2} (350/sq mi)
- Time zone: UTC+1 (CET)
  - Summer (DST): UTC+2 (CEST)
- Postal code: 40313 Sveti Martin na Muri
- Website: svetimartin.hr

Sveti Martin na Muri (Hungarian: Muraszentmárton, lit. "St-Martin-on-the-Mur") is a village and municipality in Međimurje County, in northern Croatia.

== History ==
In Ancient times, the Roman settlement Halikan (Halicanum) existed on the site of today's village Sveti Martin na Muri. The settlement was located on the Roman road that led from Poetovio to Carnuntum.

In 1334 Sveti Martin na Muri was recorded as a Catholic parish named Sancti Martini in the Census of parishes of the Zagreb Diocese. In the late 16th century, the nobleman Nicolaus Malakoczy built a castle in the village of Lapšina. The castle fell into disrepair during the 19th century and by the 1930s it was completely demolished. In 1911 in the hamlet of Vučkovec, mineral water was found while drilling for oil. In 1936 the first pool was built at the Vučkovec spring which marked the beginning of a Spa Resort in the village of Toplice Sveti Martin.

The Municipality of Sveti Martin na Muri was established in 1992.

== Geography ==
Sveti Martin na Muri is located in upper Međimurje at the border with Slovenia. The village of Sveti Martin na Muri, is located around 19 kilometres northwest from Čakovec, and some 110 kilometres north of Zagreb. The municipality covers an area of 25.24 km^{2}.

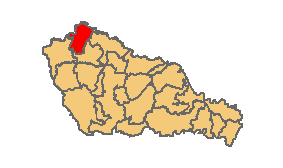
Location within Međimurje County

Geomorphologically, the municipality can be divided into two parts. The southern part consists of low hills called Međimurske Gorice, while the northern part consists of the alluvial plain of the Mur river. The Mur river divides the municipality into two parts. All settlements of the municipality are located on the right bank of the Mur, while the left bank consists of wetlands and fields. The Floodplain of the Mur is part of a natural protected area called the Mura-Drava Regional park.

There is a border crossing with Slovenia in municipality which connects the municipality with the village of Hotiza in Slovenia's Prekmurje.

The area on the left bank of the Mur river is part of an ongoing border dispute between Croatia and Slovenia.

== Demographics ==
In the 2021 census, the municipality had a population of 2,391 in the following settlements:

Village	Population
Brezovec	174
Čestijanec	91
Gornji Koncovčak	86
Gradiščak	159
Grkaveščak	89
Jurovčak	139
Jurovec	208
Kapelščak	94
Lapšina	130
Marof	88
Sveti Martin na Muri	452
Toplice Sveti Martin	56
Vrhovljan	260
Žabnik	365
TOTAL	2,391

The majority of inhabitants are Croats making up 96.86% of population.

Sveti Martin na Muri: Population trends 1857–2021
v

population	1842	1842	2012	2390	2471	2593	2687	2914	3493	3469	3304	3500	3083	2987	2958	2605	2391
	1857	1869	1880	1890	1900	1910	1921	1931	1948	1953	1961	1971	1981	1991	2001	2011	2021

Sources: Croatian Bureau of Statistics publications

== Administration ==
The current mayor of Sveti Martin na Muri is Martin Srša and the Sveti Martin na Muri Municipal Council consists of 9 seats.

Groups	Councilors per group
Independents	5 / 9
SDP-HSU	3 / 9
HDZ	1 / 9

== Culture ==
The Church of Saint Martin was built in the late Middle Ages and later restyled in a baroque manner. The church was mentioned in 1334 (Sancti Martini), in 1501 (Sancti Martini superioris) and in 1650 (Sancti Martini in Komory). The sanctuary is polygonal, arched with a late-gothic cross vault, with ten corbels which are engraved with angel figures and floral ornaments. One has the year 1468 engraved in and there are gothic fresco wall paintings. The current sacristy was built in 1777.

The baroque chapel of Saint Margaret in village of Kapelščak was built in 1775.

== Tourism ==
The municipality of Sveti Martin na Muri has highly developed rural tourism. It is considered one of the best health and wellness tourism destinations in Croatia, and has received several regional, national and international tourism awards. In 2007, Sveti Martin na Muri was named one of the 10 Best European Rural Destinations of Excellence. Bathing tourism is based on the healing power of the Vučkovec mineral spring.

== Gallery ==
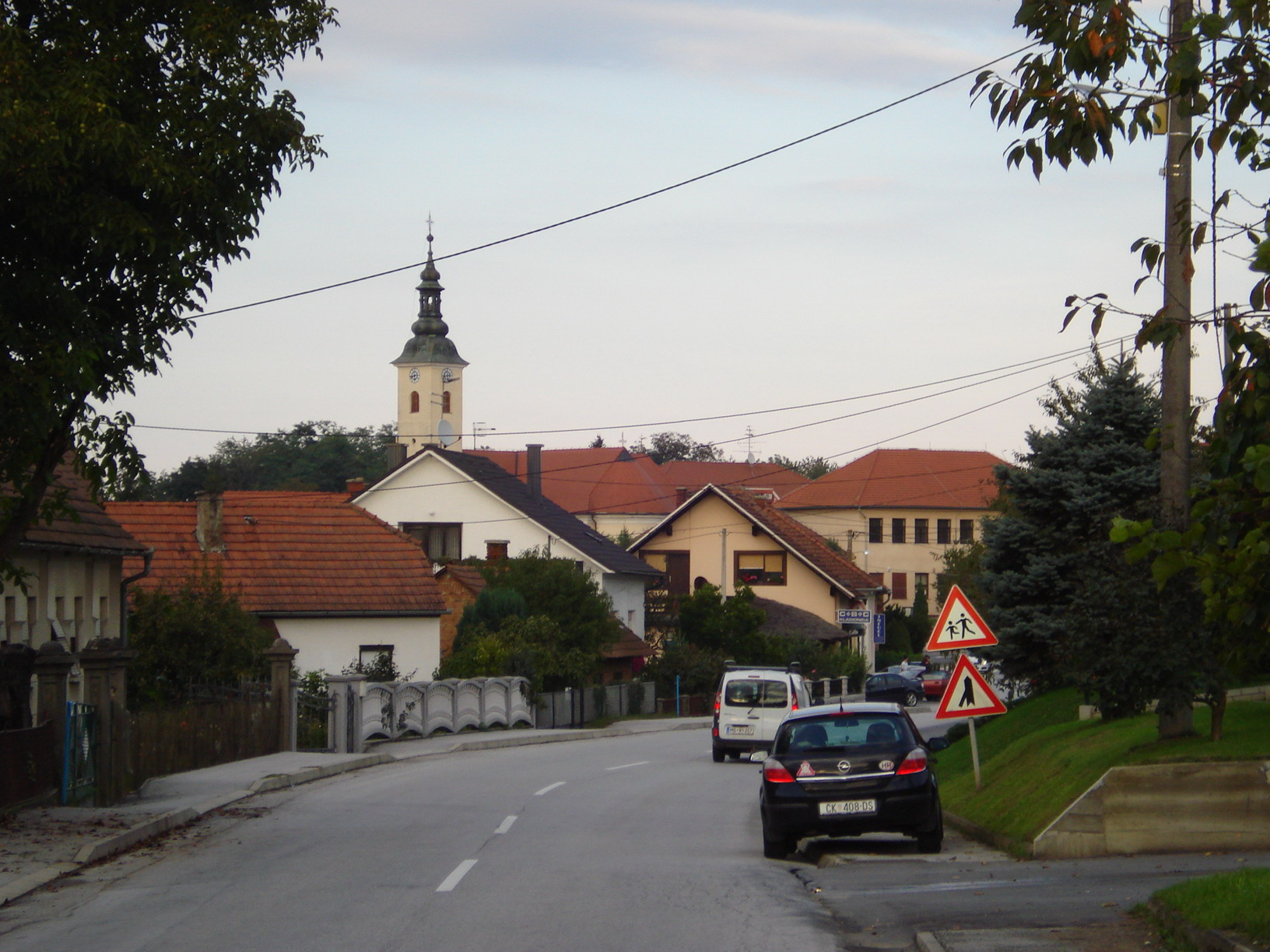
Main Street

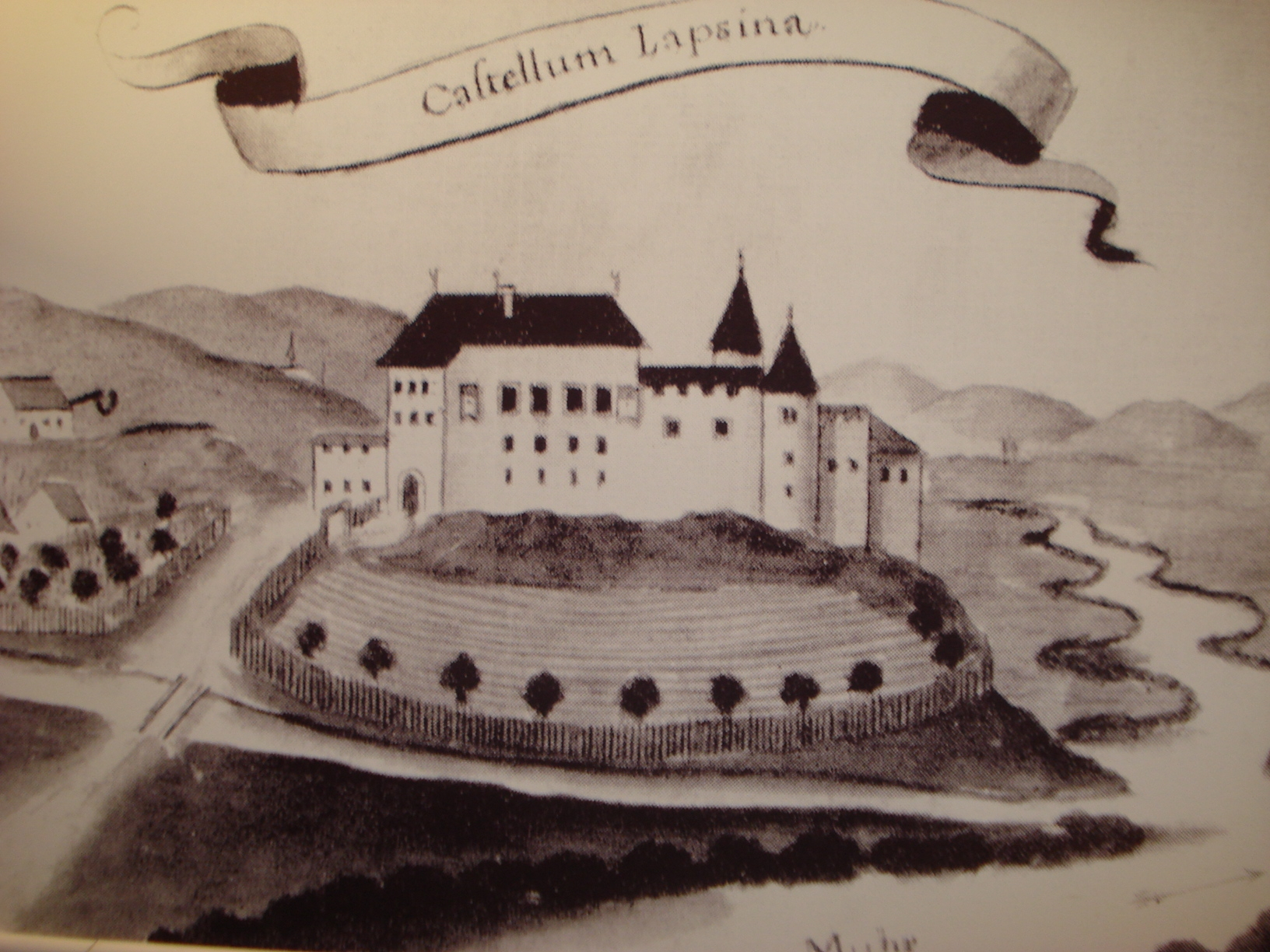
Ruined castle of Lapšina

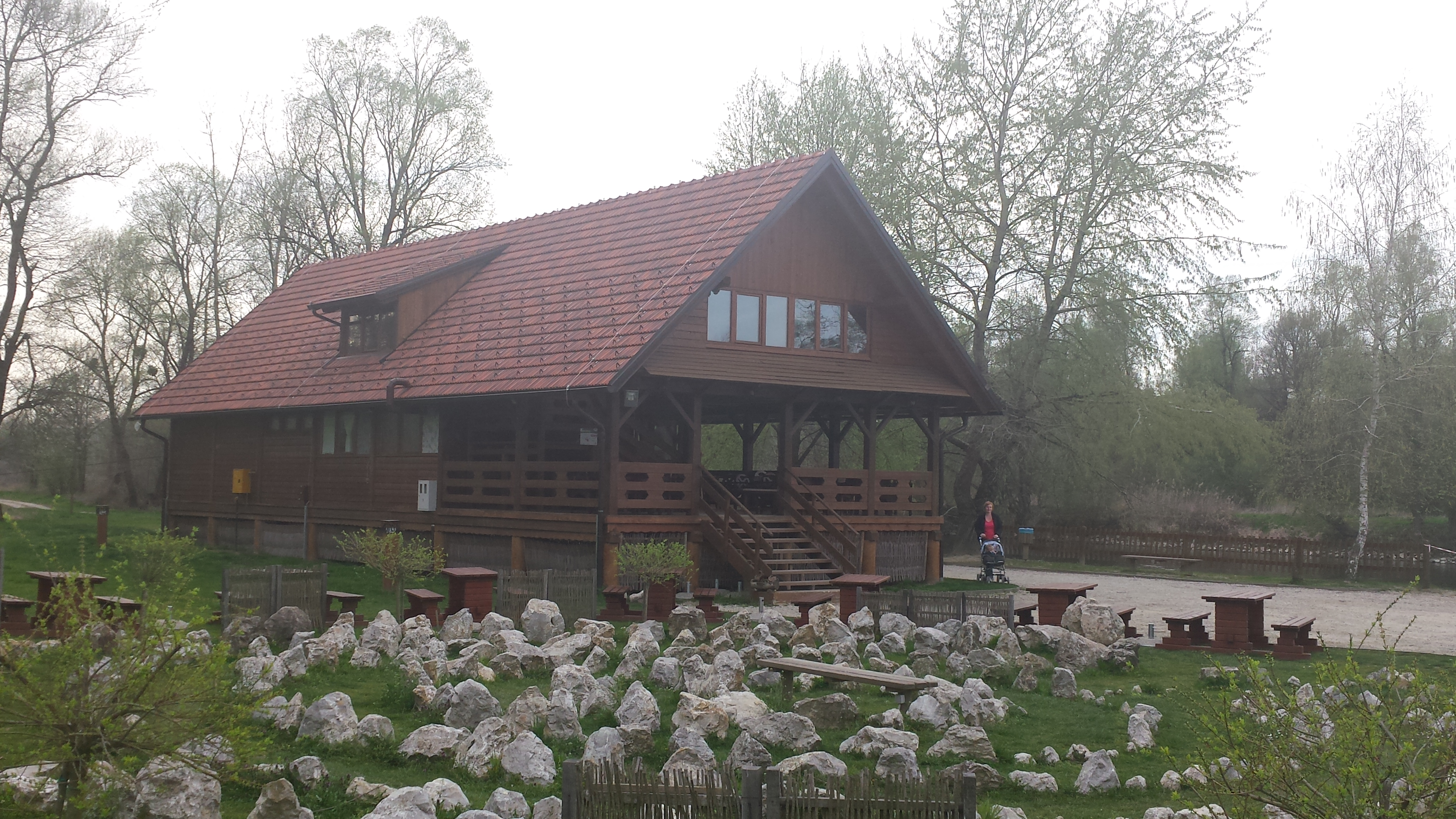
Mlinarska kuća

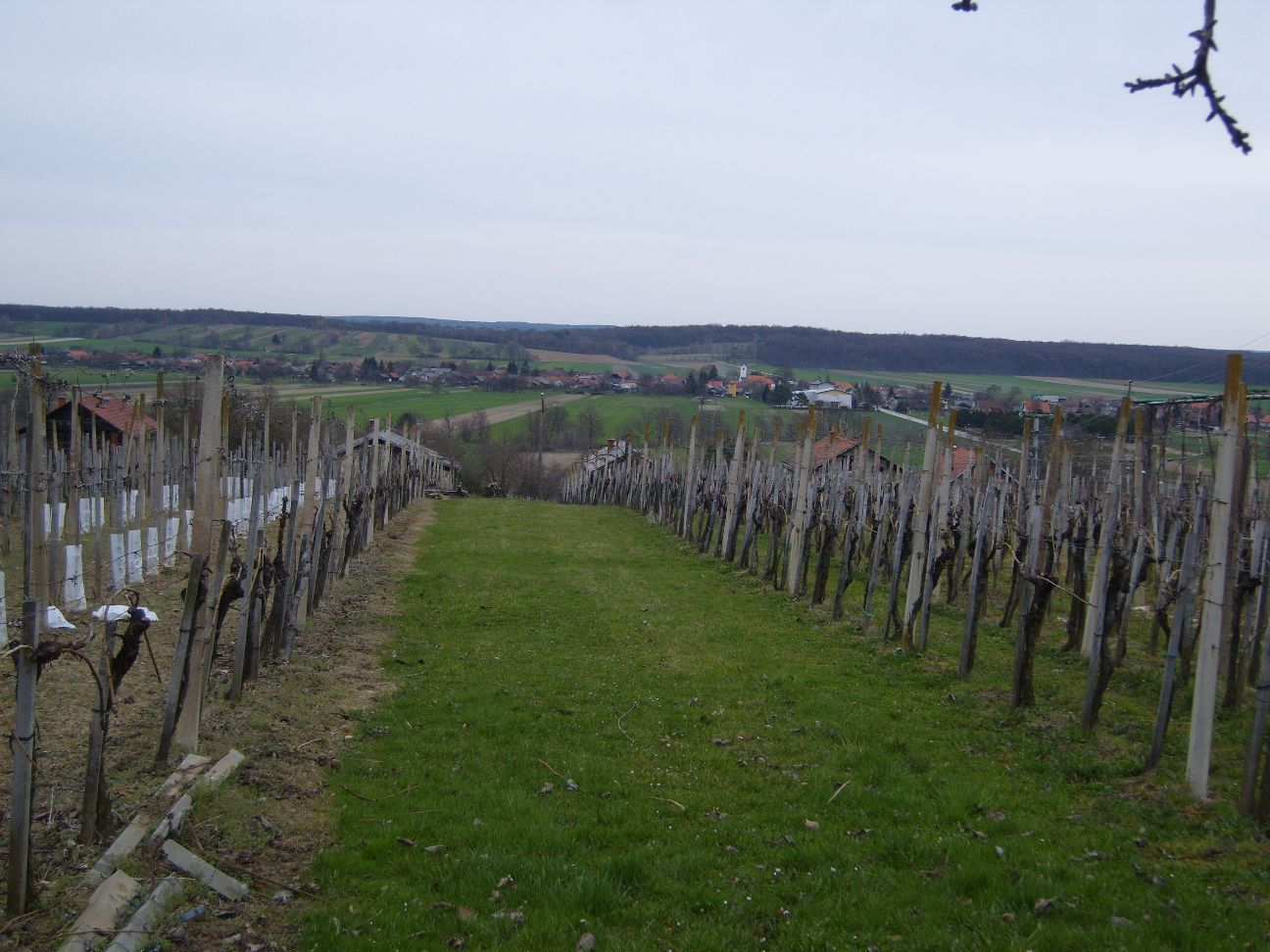
View of Sveti Martin na Muri

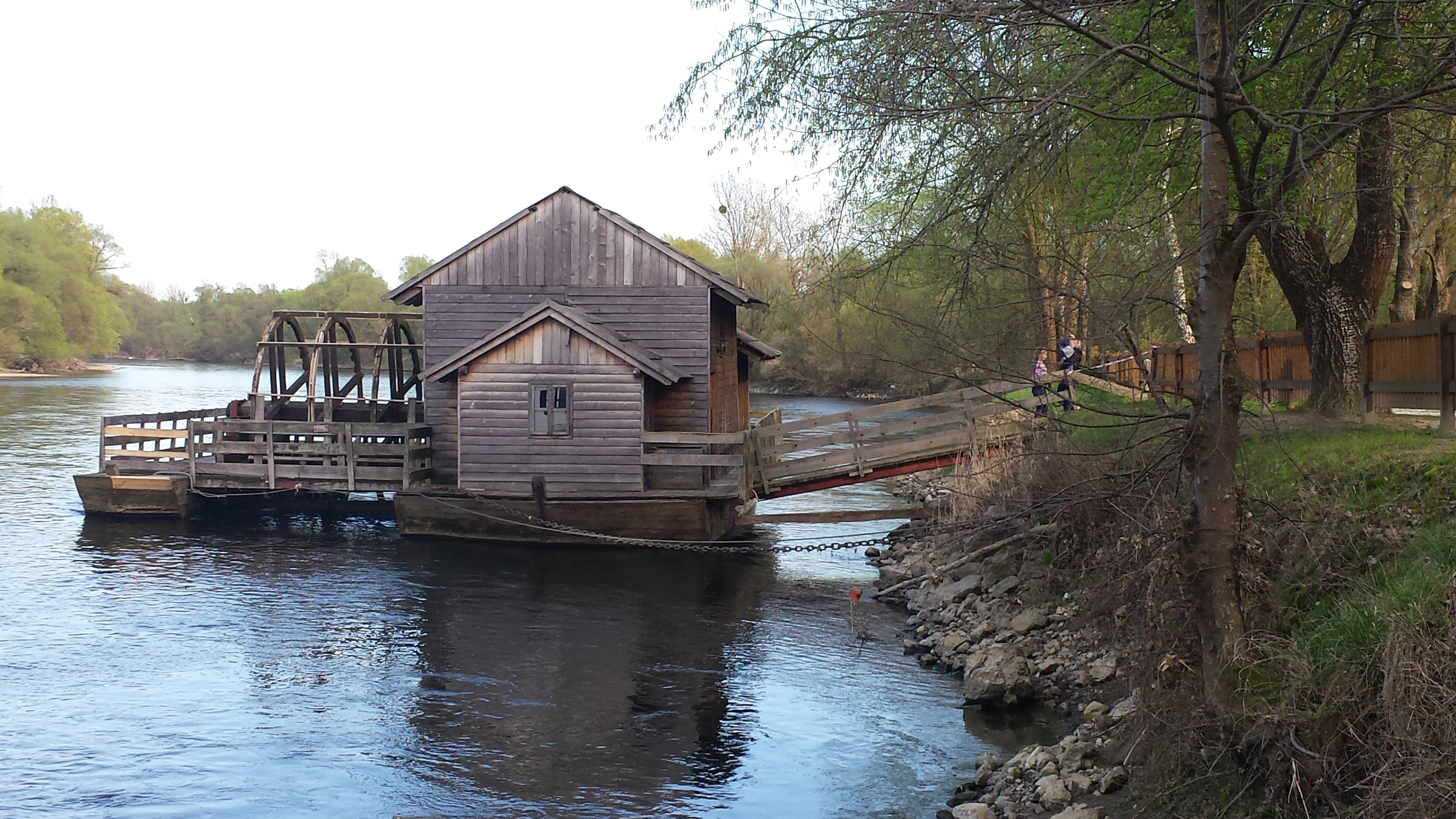
A watermill on Mura

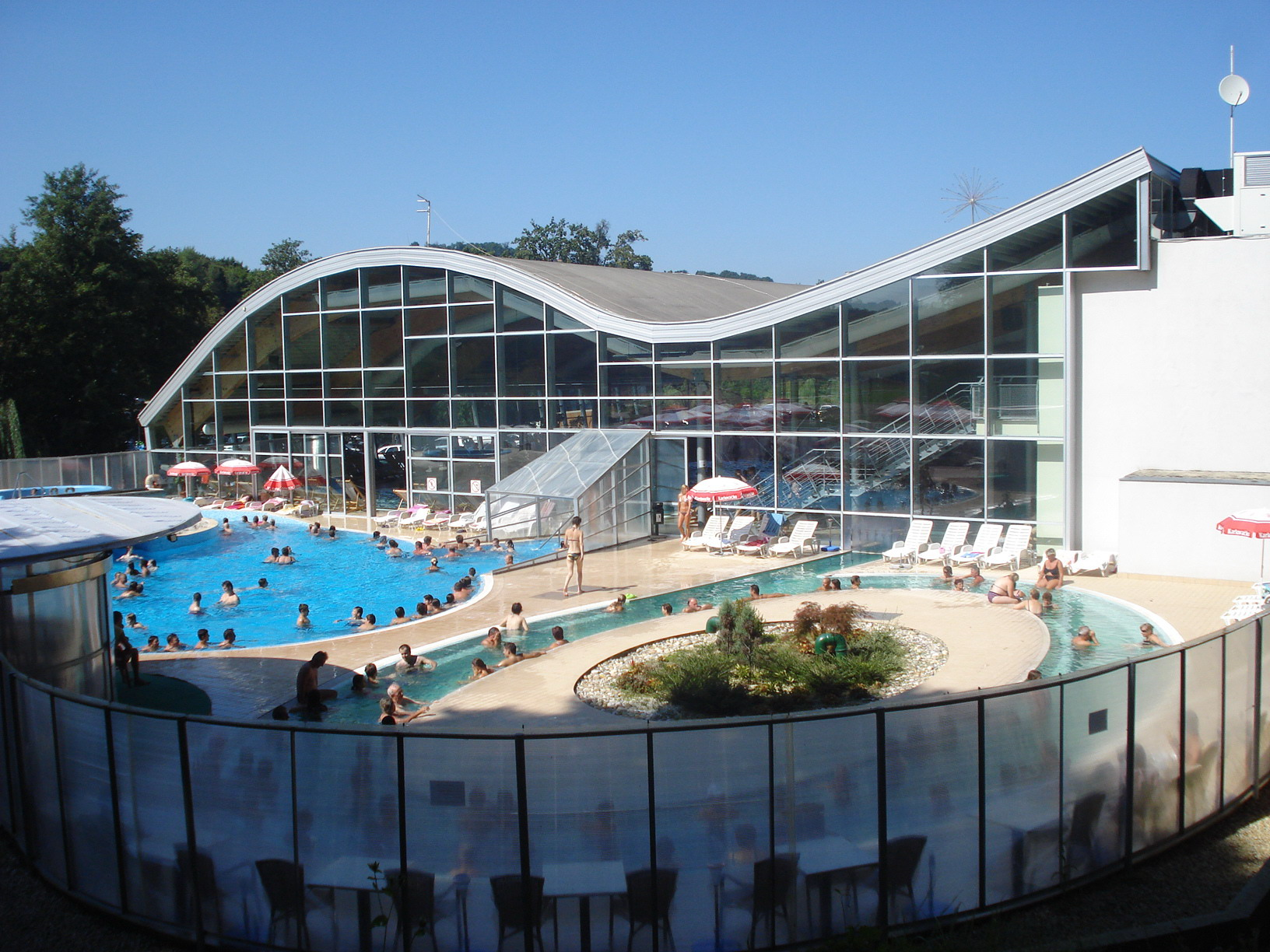
Vučkovec Tourist Resort

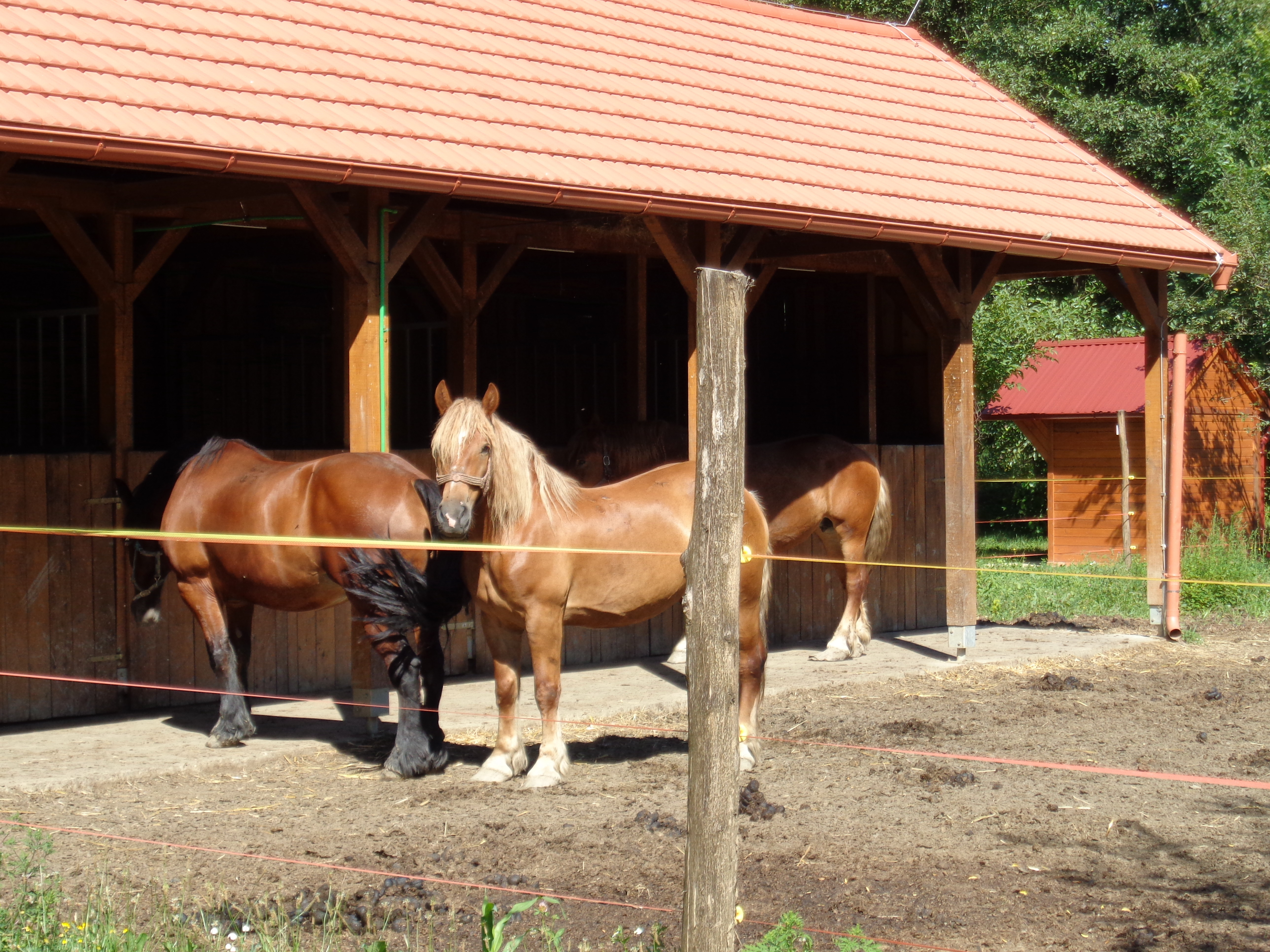
Međimurje horse stud farm in the nearby village of Žabnik

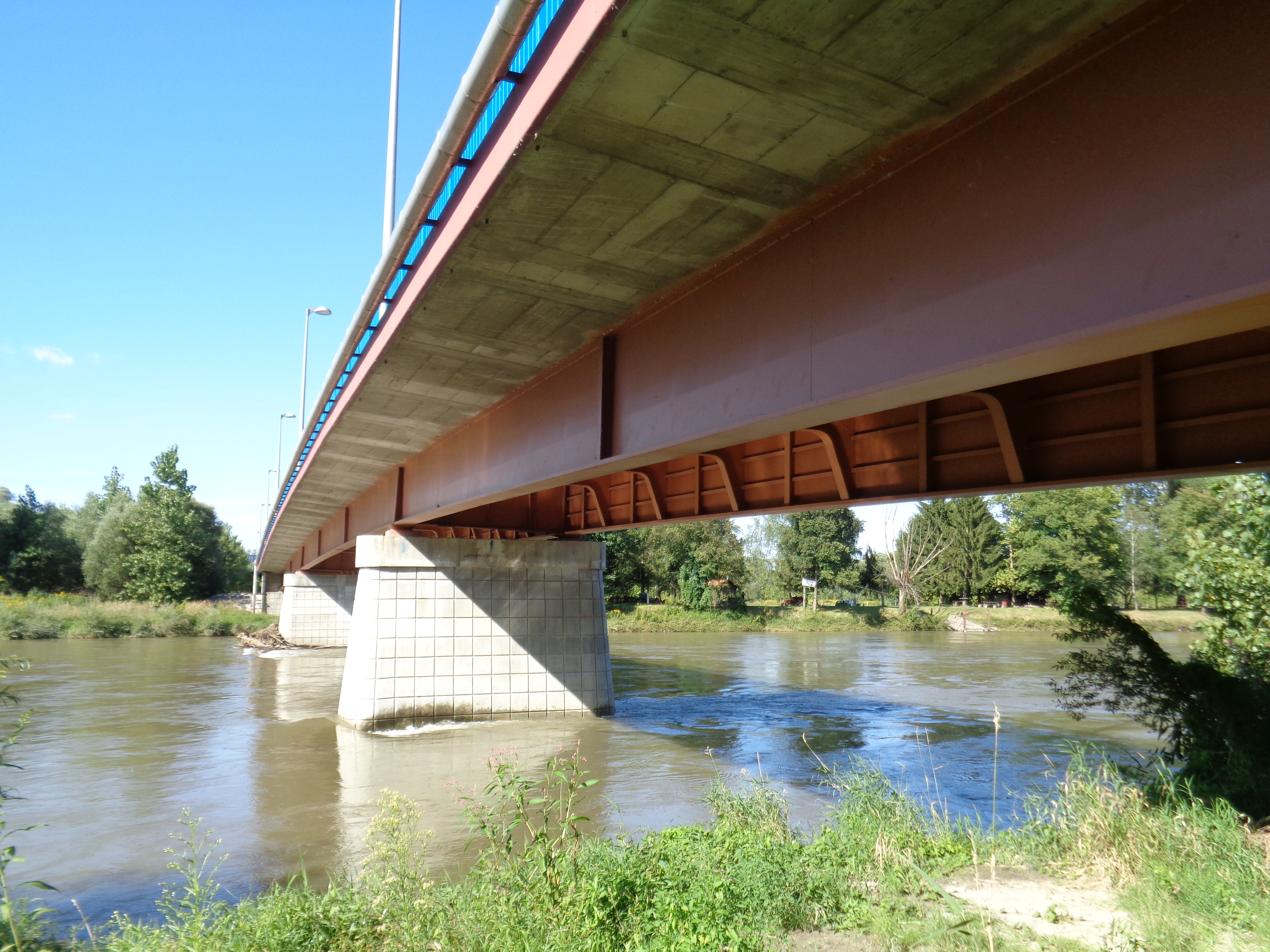
Road bridge over the Mura river in Sveti Martin na Muri

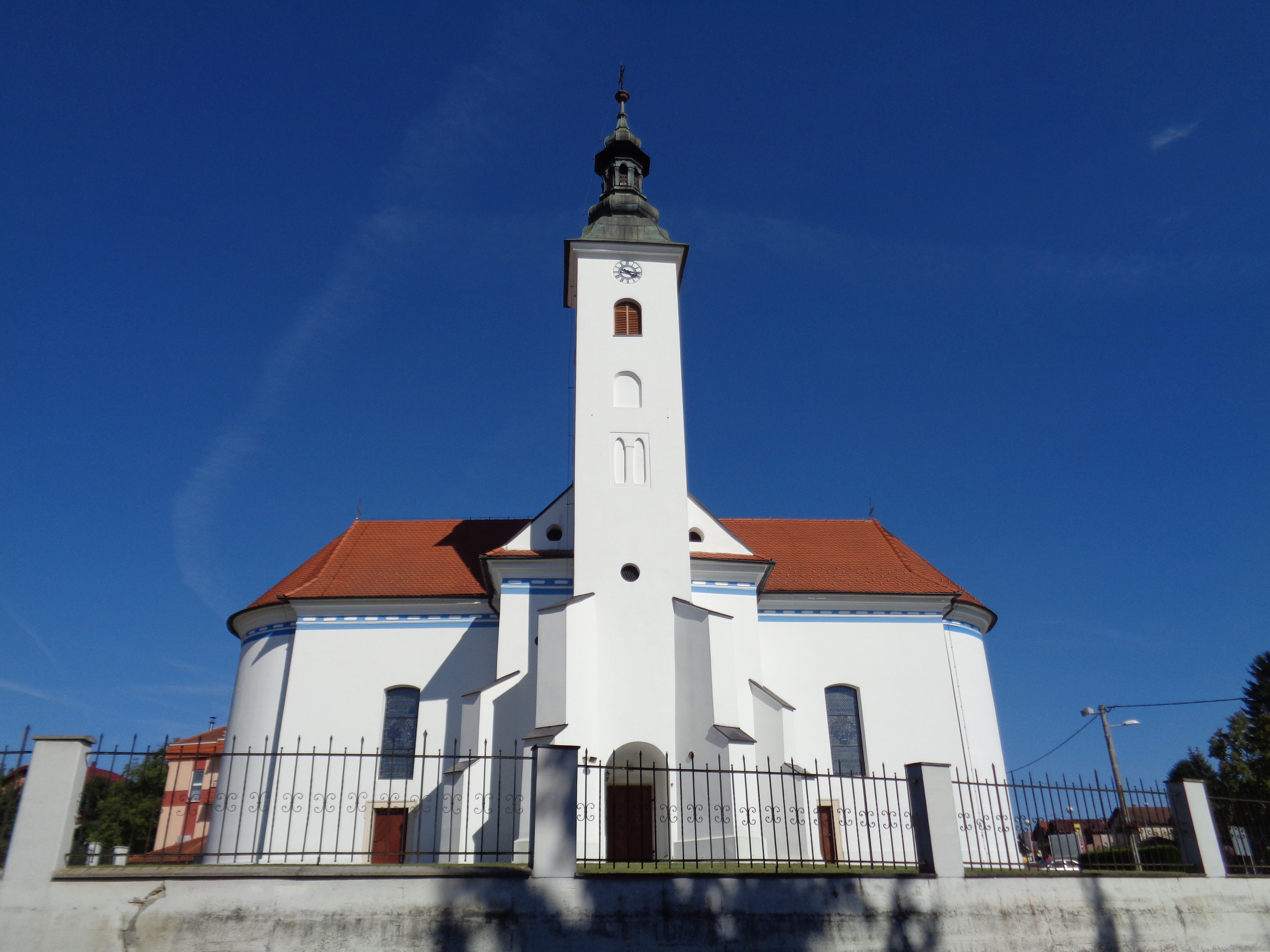
Saint Martin Church in the village centre

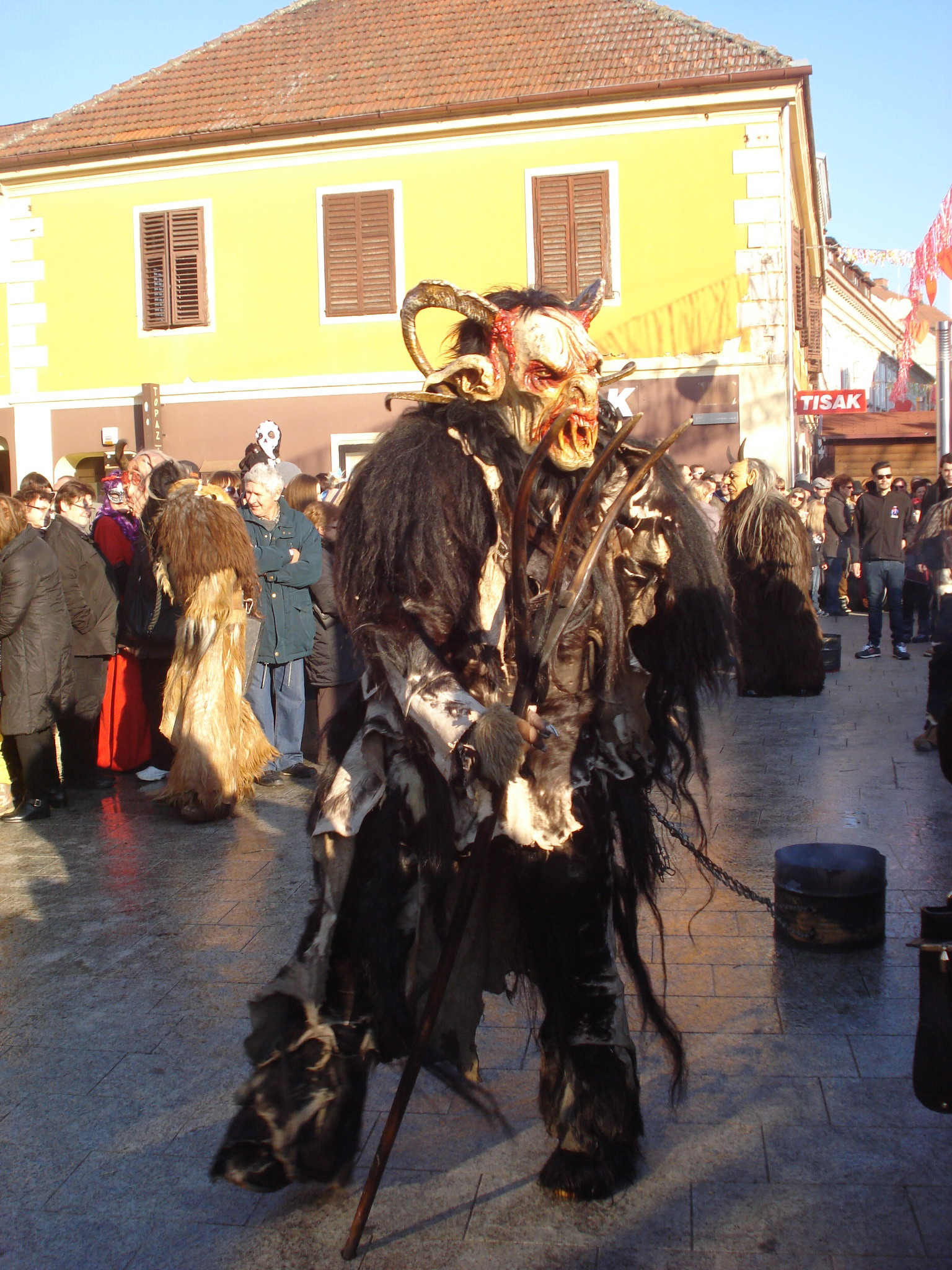
A man dressed as a krampus in Sveti Martin na Muri

== Bibliography ==
- Korunek, Marijana (2009). "Župna crkva sv. Martina biskupa u Svetom Martinu na Muri" (PDF). Godišnjak zaštite spomenika kulture Hrvatske (in Croatian) (33/34): 113–130.
