= Josip Štolcer-Slavenski =

Croatian composer

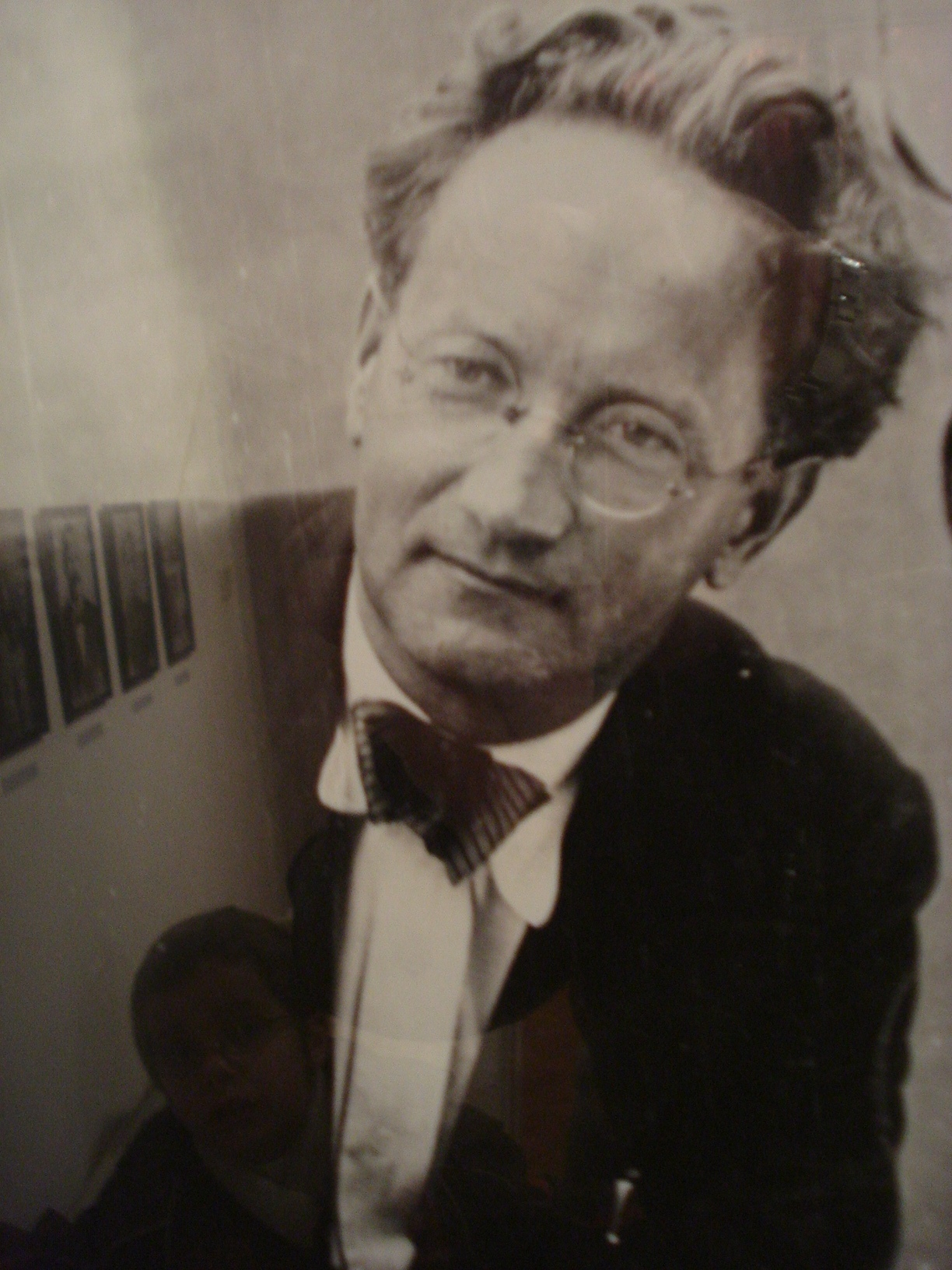
- Josip Štolcer-Slavenski in 1935
- Born: 11 May 1896; Čakovec, Croatia-Slavonia, Austria-Hungary (modern Croatia)
- Died: 30 November 1955 (aged 59); Belgrade, SFR Yugoslavia (modern Serbia)
- Era: 20th century

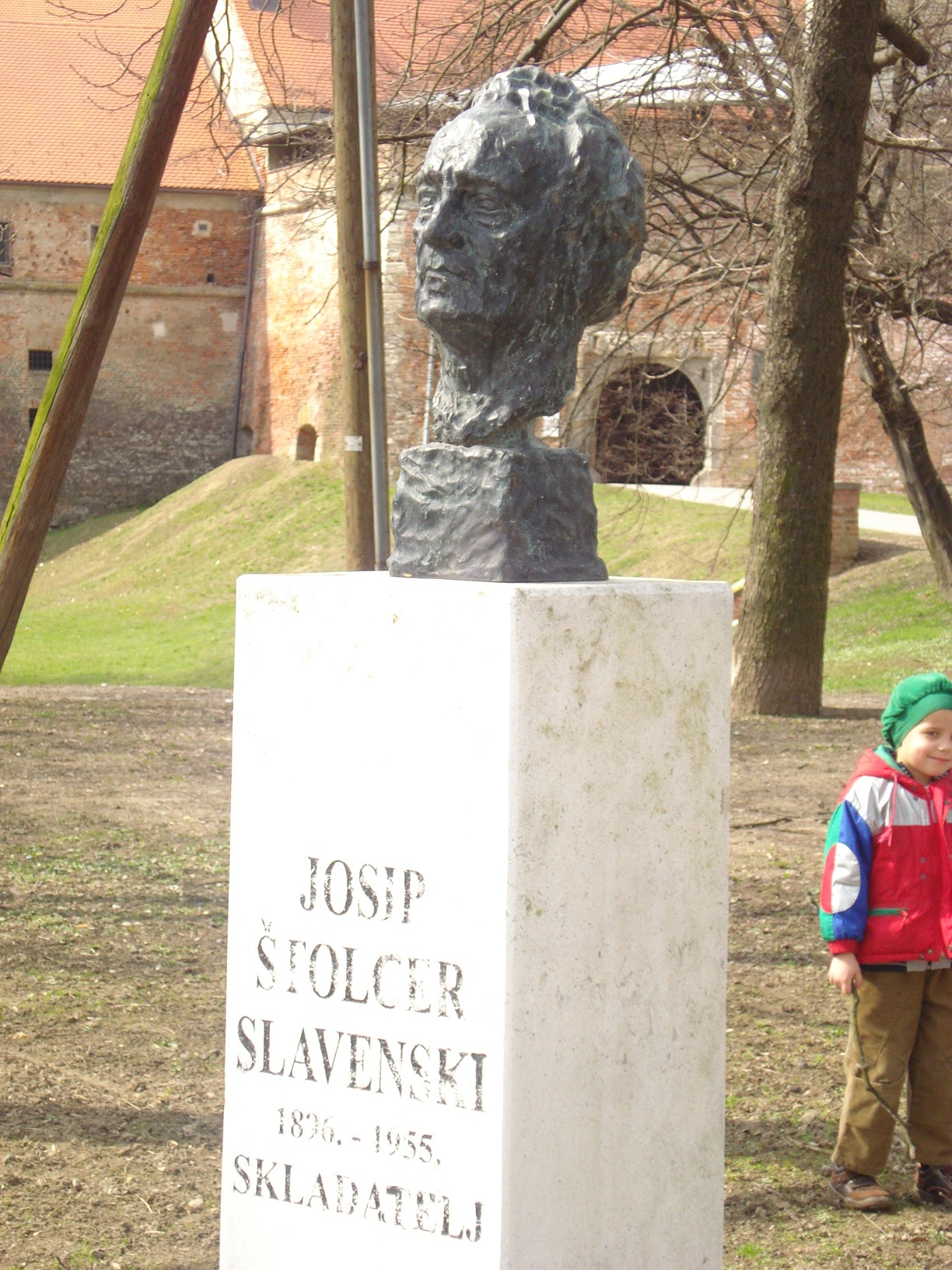
Josip Štolcer-Slavenski monument in Zrinski Park in Čakovec

Josip Štolcer-Slavenski (Serbian Cyrillic: Јосип Штолцер-Славенски; 11 May 1896 – 30 November 1955) was a Croatian composer and professor at the Music Academy in Belgrade.

British musicologist Jim Samson described Štolcer-Slavenski as "undoubtedly one of a very small handful of truly major composers from South East Europe in the first half of the twentieth century".

== Life and career ==
Josip Štolcer was born in Čakovec in 1896. His father gave him his first instruction in music, then in 1913 he entered the Budapest Conservatory where his teachers included Zoltán Kodály, Albert Siklós, and Béla Bartók. His studies were interrupted in 1916 by army service and at the end of the war he returned to his father's bakery business in Čakovec. In 1921 he went to study in Novák's masterclasses at the Prague Conservatory. While in Prague, he joined the International Society for Contemporary Music. Having completed his studies in 1923 he returned to Croatia and taught for a year at the music school of the Zagreb Music Academy. At that time, he started to sign his last name as Štolcer-Slavenski, which was both a reflection of his enthusiasm for the Yugoslav idea, and a rejection of his German-sounding last name. In 1924 he moved to Belgrade, where he stayed for the rest of his life (except for a period in 1925–6 spent in Paris); he taught first at the Stanković School of Music, then at the music school of the Belgrade Academy (1937–45), becoming in 1945 professor of composition at the latter.

Slavenski first attracted attention when in 1920 his orchestral Notturno op.1 was performed in Zagreb; in 1924 his First String Quartet was performed with success at the Donaueschingen Festival. Kleiber conducted his symphony Balkanophonia, first in Berlin in 1927 and then in various musical centres in Europe and the USA. Slavenski thus became the first Yugoslav composer of the 20th century to make an international reputation. At home, however, after the first success in 1920, he had to face the hostility of the then conservative Belgrade public and critics. After 1938 he composed very little; his works were seldom performed between 1940 and 1956 and he was almost forgotten. He died in Belgrade in 1955. It was only after his death that his stature was recognized.

== Work ==
Initially Slavenski developed as an autodidact. The rich folk music of his native region, Međimurje in north-western Croatia, left a decisive impact on him, and his youthful fascination with the sounds of church bells and the intricate combinations of their upper partials greatly contributed towards the formation of his harmonic idiom. His early compositions, dating from the time of his Budapest studies, show a blend of spontaneity with a strong desire for experiment. Polytonality and bold dissonances occurred in his piano pieces as early as 1913, at a time when many southern Slav composers were still treating material borrowed from folk tradition in a predominantly Romantic way. Such interests brought him close to the music of Kodály and Bartók, and his academic studies deepened the mastery of counterpoint, which remained a vital ingredient of his style. He continued to experiment with new ideas throughout the 1920s: the Sonata for violin and organ contains sonorities which foreshadow electronic music, and the Piano Sonata uses aleatory technique. Slavenski's interest in folk music broadened in the late 1920s to encompass that of the whole of the Balkans, and the culminating result of this was his Balkanophonia. He was equally attracted by the mystical and ritual aspects of music, as may be seen from Chaos, a movement from the unfinished Heliophonia, and Religiophonia, the latter generally considered to be his masterpiece. During the 1920s and 30s he was one of the very few Yugoslav composers who showed an awareness of the searching spirit of the avant garde abroad. His imaginative use of percussion instruments may occasionally recall Varèse, whose works he did not know. He had no predecessors in Yugoslav music and no followers in his lifetime. When after his death his music became better known, it was already too late for it to exercise a direct influence on Yugoslav composers, though his creative use of folk music and his experiments of the 1920s provided a necessary impulse.

== Opus ==
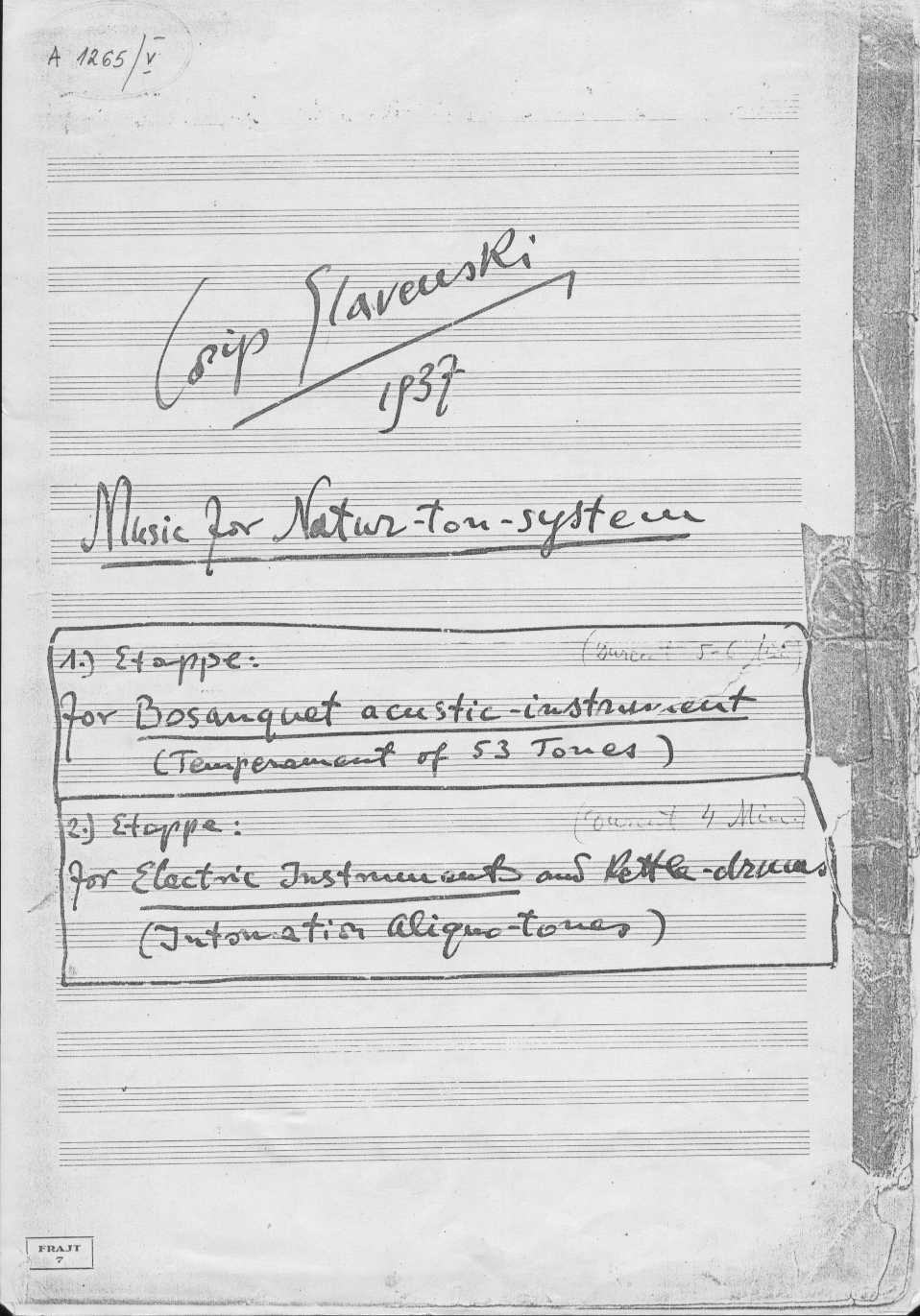
Facsimile of the 53EDO piece title by J. Š. Slavenski

- Sabrana djela [Collected works], ed. N. Devčić (Zagreb and Belgrade, 1983–) [S]
- Orch: Notturno, op.1, 1916, rev. 1920; Chaos from inc. Heliophonia, 1918–32 [S]; Balkanophonia, op.10, 1927 [S]; Vn Conc., 1927; Religiophonia (Simfonija orijenta), solo vv, chorus, orch, 1934; Muzika za orkestar, 1936 [S]; 4 balkanske igre [4 Balkan Dances], 1938 [S]; Muzika, chbr orch, 1938; Simfonijski epos, 1944–6; Pf Conc., 1951, inc.
- Chbr: Sonata religiosa, op.7, vn, org, 1919–25; Str Qt no.1, op.3, 1923 [S]; Slavenska sonata, op.5, vn, pf, 1924 [S]; Južnoslavenska pjesma i ples [South Slavonic Song and Dance], vn, pf, 1925 [S]; Sa sela [From the Country], op.6, fl, cl, vn, va, db, 1925 [S]; Str Qt no.2 ‘Lyric’, op.11, 1928 [S]; Str Trio, 1930; Wind Qnt, 1930 [S]; Str Qt no.3, 1936 [S]; Music for 4 trautoniums and timp, 1937; Str Qt no.4, c1949 [arr. of 4 balkanske igre, 1938]
- Pf: Sa Balkana, 1910–17 [S]; Iz Jugoslavije, 1916–23 [S]; Jugoslavenska svita, op.2, 1921 [S]; Sonata, op.4, 1924 [S]; Plesovi i pjesme sa Balkana [Dances and Songs from the Balkans], 2 vols., 1927 [S]
- Vocal: Pesme moje majke [Songs of my Mother], A, str qt, 1916–44 [S]; Voda zvira iz kamena [Water Springs from the Stone], chorus, 1916–21; Molitva dobrim očima [Prayer to the Good Eyes], chorus, 1924; Ftiček veli [Little Bird Speaks], chorus, 1927; 6 narodnih popijevaka [6 Folksongs], chorus, 1927; other folksong arrs.

Incid music, music for Bosanquet's hmn, film scores

Principal publishers: Društvo skladatelja Hrvatske, Naklada Saveza Kompozitora Jugoslavije, Schott, Udruženje kompozitora Srbije

=== Međimurje songs ===
- Međimorje kak si lepo zeleno (Međimurje, how beautifully green you are)
- Raca plava po Dravi (Swimming duck on the Drava river)
- Tu za repu tu za len (Catch for turnip and catch for flax)
- Imala majka tri jedine kceri (A mother had three daughters)

== Bibliography ==
- P. Bingulac: ‘Horska muzika Josipa Slavenskog’ [Slavenski's choral music], Zvuk (1966), Part I no.69, pp. 535–57; Part II no.70, pp. 727–4
- B. Bujić: ‘Daleki svijet muzikom dokučen’ Izraz, vii (1963), 324–36
- B. Bujić: ‘Tematska struktura u Prvom guadackom kvartetu Josipa Slavenskog’, MZ, xiv (1978), 73–87
- Ćirić, Sonja. "Istina zvuka". Vreme (in Serbian). No. 775.
- G. Doliner, ‘Josip Štolcer Slavenski (1896–1955), Sonata Religiosa za violinu i orgulje (1919–1925).’ Između moderne i avantgarde. Hrvatska glazba 1910–1960, Ed. Eva Sedak. Zagreb: Hrvatsko muzikološko društvo, 2004, 245–51
- C. Dragotin. ‘Veze Josipa Slavenskog sa Slavkom Ostercom’, Arti Musices 3 (1972), 69–72
- S. Grujić,‘Orkestarska dela Josipa Slavenskog’. Undergraduate diss., Fakultet muzičke umetnosti, Belgrade, 1983
- Hrustek Sobočan, Maša (2014). "Josip Štolcer Slavenski - čakovečki skladateljski genij s beogradskom adresom i svjetskim glasom" [Josip Štolcer Slavenski - musical genius from Čakovec with Belgrade address and international reputation] (PDF). Muzeologija (in Croatian) (51). Zagreb: Museum Documentation Centre: 115–131.
- Medić, Ivana, ed. (2017). Josip Slavenski 1896 - 1955: Povodom 120-godišnjice rođenja (PDF). MI SASA - Collective monographs and conference proceedings. Musicological Institute of the Serbian Academy of Sciences and Arts. ISBN 978-86-80639-31-4.
- B. Milanović,‘Stvaralaštvo Josipa Slavenskog – prilog tumačenju opusa kao jedinstvenog dela’ Josipa Slavenski i njegovo doba, ed. Mirjana Živković. Belgrade: SOKOJ-MIC, 2006, 141–49
- R. Pejović,‘Prilog Monografiji Josipa Slavenskog: mišljenje kritičara o njegovim kompozicijama u vremenu od 1920-1941.godine', Zvuk 1 (1985), 51–8
- S. Radinović,‘Stanislav Vinaver, Jožef Debreceni, Josip Slavenski i Bela Bartók’, Josip Slavenski i njegovo doba, ed. Mirjana Živković. Belgrade: SOKOJ-MIC, 2006, 239–55
- Samson, Jim (2013). "Serbo-Croat". Music in the Balkans. Brill Publishers. pp. 369–390. ISBN 978-9004250383.
- E. Sedak, Josip Slavenski, bilješke o nekim do sada nepoznatim skladbama’, Zvuk 2 (1981), 5–1.
- E. Sedak: Josip Štolcer Slavenski: skladatelj prijelaza, 2 vols. (Zagreb, 1984)
- M. Slavenski: ‘ Veze Josipa Slavenskog s muzičkom izdavačkom kućom B. Schott’s Söhne, Mainz’, Zvuk, nos.109–10 (1970), 437–41
- P. Stefanović,‘Šta se sve krije i otkriva u “Balkanofoniji” Josipa Slavenskog’, Zvuk 111–2 (1971), 21–5
- D. Špirić,‘Canon at the Periphery: Contextualizing the Music of Josip Slavenski’, Music and Networking, Eds T. Marković and V. Mikić. Belgrade: Signature, 2005, 172–8
- D. Špirić,‘Imagining a Balkan Community: Modernism, Slavenski and the First Yugoslavia (1918–1945)', Josip Slavenski i njegovo doba, Ed. Mirjana Živković. Belgrade: SOKOJ-MIC, 2006, 157–68
- D. Špirić-Beard, Border – Bridge – Crossroads: the Construction of Yugoslav Identity in Music (1835–1938) and the Case of Josip Štolcer Slavenski, Ph.D. diss., Cardiff, Cardiff University, 2012
- K. Tomašević, Srpska muzika na raskršću istoka i zapada – o dijalogu tradicionalnog i modernog u srpskoj muzici između dva svetska rata, Ph.D. diss., Belgrade, Fakultet muzičkih umetnosti, 2004
- Tomašević, Katarina (June 2016). "On the Paths of Bela Bartok's Modernism Followers and Companions: Josip Slavenski and Marko Tajevic". Muzikološki Zbornik. 52 (1): 27–40. doi:10.4312/mz.52.1.27-40. hdl:21.15107/rcub_dais_13251.
