= Međimurec =

Međimurec is a surname. Notable people with the surname include:

- Josip Horvat Međimurec (1904–1945), Croatian painter
- Jože Međimurec (born 1945), Slovene middle-distance runner
- Ladislav Kralj Međimurec (1891–1976), Croatian artist
