= Adam Zrinski =

Croatian count and military officer (1662–1691)

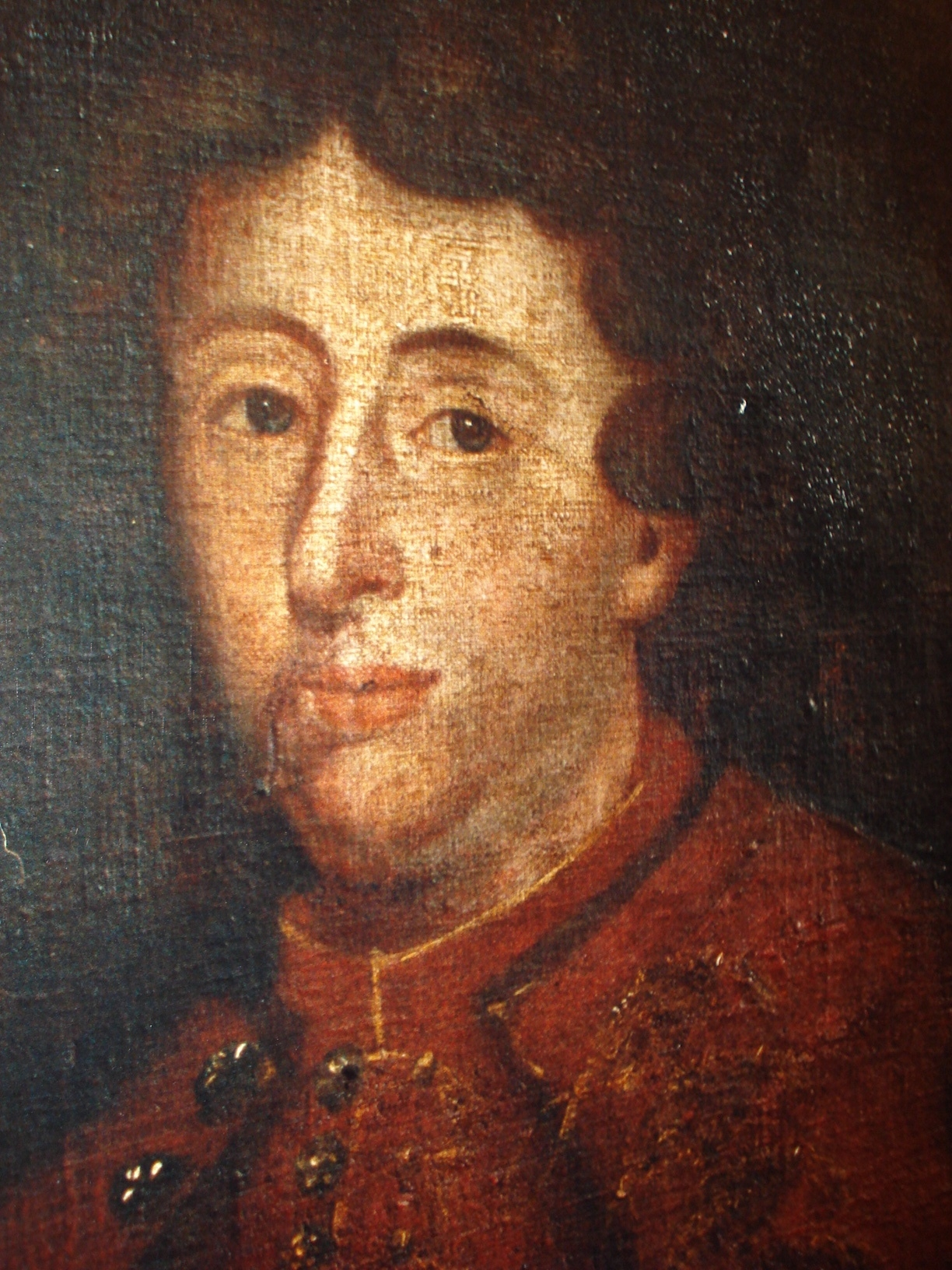
Adam Zrinski (1662–1691)

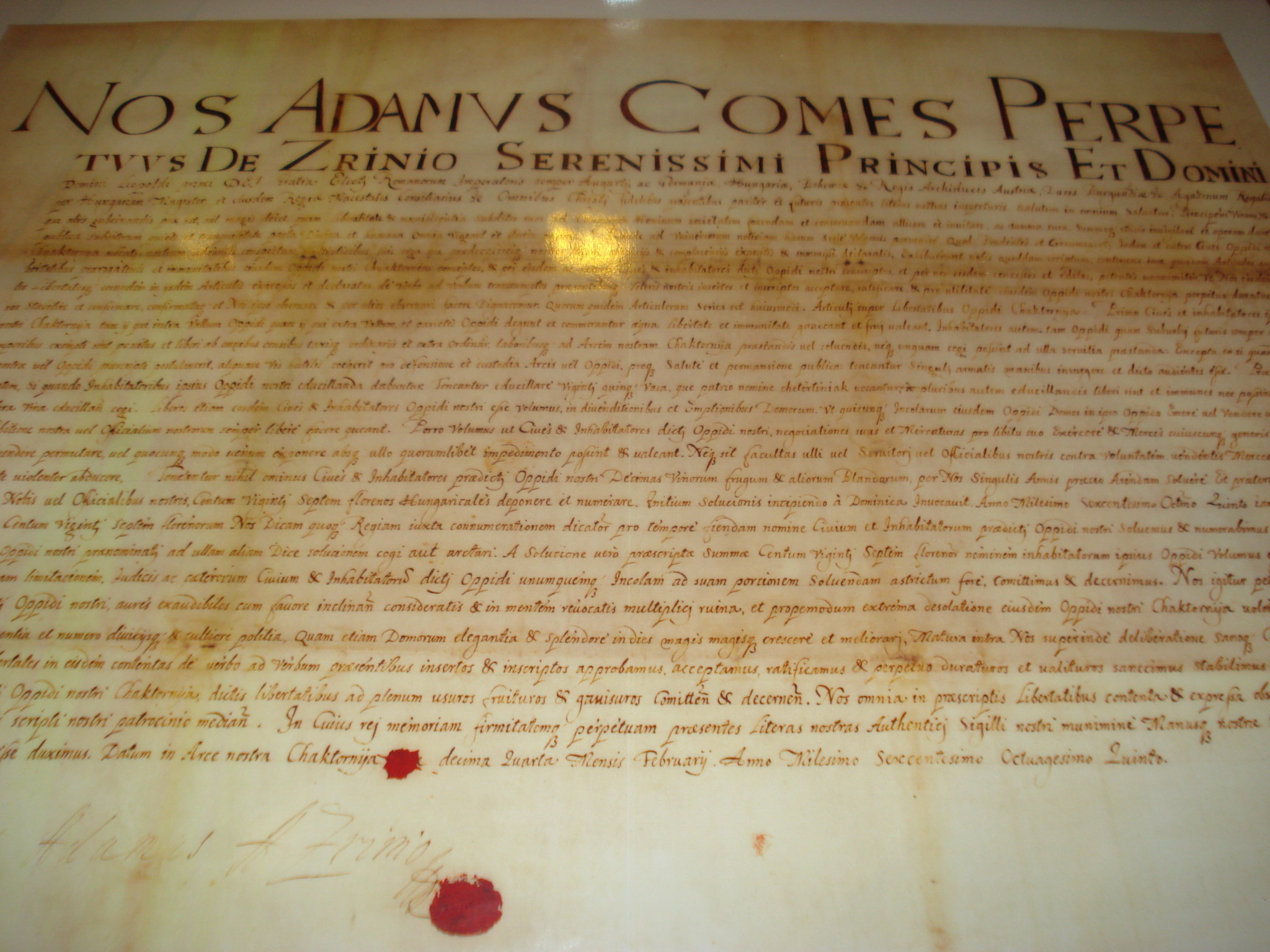
Adam Zrinski confirmed privileges to the inhabitants of Čakovec in a charter from 1684.

Adam Zrinski (Hungarian: Zrínyi Ádám) (Vienna, 24 December 1662 – Slankamen, 19 August 1691) was a Croatian count and officer in Habsburg monarchy army service, a member of the Zrinski noble family.

== Life ==
Adam Zrinski was the son of Croatian Ban (viceroy) Nikola Zrinski (1620–1664) and his second wife Maria Sophia Löbl, an Austrian baroness.

His father was killed on 18 November 1664 in a hunting accident by a wounded wild boar (however in suspicious circumstances), when Adam was only two years old. So he grew up with his mother (until her death in 1676) and sister Marija Katarina (English: Mary Catherine), finishing high education at University of Vienna and in Belgium.

In 1681 Adam came back to his father's Čakovec estate in the Međimurje County, the northernmost part of Croatia, and took part in battles against the Ottomans, like many of his ancestors had done before. In 1684 he married an Austrian countess Maria Katarina Lamberg (1664–1717), but they had no children.

From his father he inherited Bibliotheca Zriniana, one of the largest and most valuable individual compacted libraries ever appeared in Croatia and its surroundings. Fortunately the library has been almost fully saved during the turbulent centuries and is stored now in the Croatian National and University Library in Zagreb.

During his career Adam Zrinski reached the rank of lieutenant-colonel of the Habsburg monarchy cavalry. He commanded his cavalry unit during the Great Turkish War (1683-1699). He was only 28, when he was killed during the Battle of Slankamen in 1691, as one of his fellow soldiers shot him in his back. He was one of the last male members of the famous Croatian noble family Zrinski.
