= Međimurje County Museum =

Regional heritage museum in Čakovec, Croatia

- Muzej Međimurja Čakovec
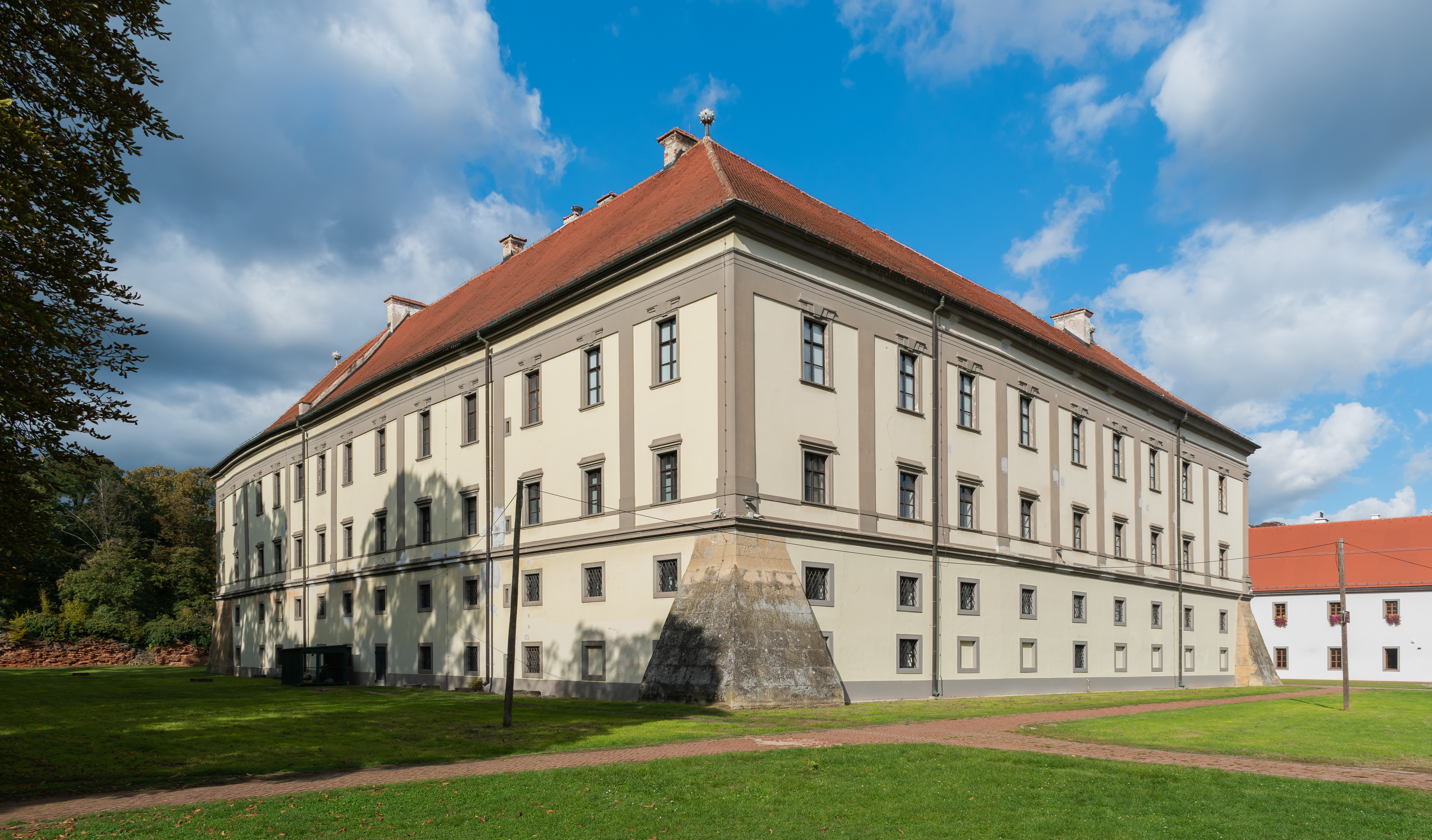
- Museum is housed in the Zrinski Castle inner palace

- The location of Međimurje County Museum within Croatia
- Established: 1954
- Location: Trg Republike 5, Čakovec, Croatia
- Coordinates: 46°23′18″N 16°26′22″E
- Type: Regional homeland museum of culture, art, archaeology, ethnography, history and natural heritage
- Collection size: 18,993 objects
- Director: Mag. Vladimir Kalšan
- Website: www.muzej-medjimurja.hr

The Međimurje County Museum in Čakovec, the seat of Međimurje County, Croatia, is located in the Zrinski Castle inner palace, the biggest medieval fortification in the county, close to the centre of the town and its main square.

== History ==
The museum was established in 1954 by the authorities of Međimurje County as Čakovec Town Museum and opened to the public in 1955. At the beginning it was housed in the exhibition halls inside the fortified outer buildings of the castle. Later it was enlarged, renamed and transferred to the three-storey inner palace of the castle complex, so it has around 5,000 m^{2} (54,000 sq ft) today.

== Function ==
The museum is a regional cultural heritage museum. It collects, preserves, maintains, displays, exhibits and interprets artifacts pertinent to the history of Međimurje County. It also gives expert help, guiding services and other informational services, organizes educational lectures and specialized exhibitions, publishes expert books and has other activities.

== Departments and collections ==
Among the museum's exhibits are many local artifacts and archeological findings dating from prehistory to recent history (20th century). A series of rooms depicts different periods of history and include information boards. Themes covered include ethnographical heritage and the history of the local economy.

There are five departments in the museum aiming to promote the county's rich legacy of heritage, culture and arts: archeology, ethnography, cultural history, history and visual arts gallery. The last includes the memorial collection of Ladislav Kralj–Međimurec (1891–1976), a notable Croatian painter and engraver.

The five departments comprise a total of 18,993 exhibited items distributed in 51 various collections, including a lapidarium situated in the inner courtyard (atrium) of the Zrinski palace, with a large number of stone monuments exhibited in the open air.

== Gallery ==
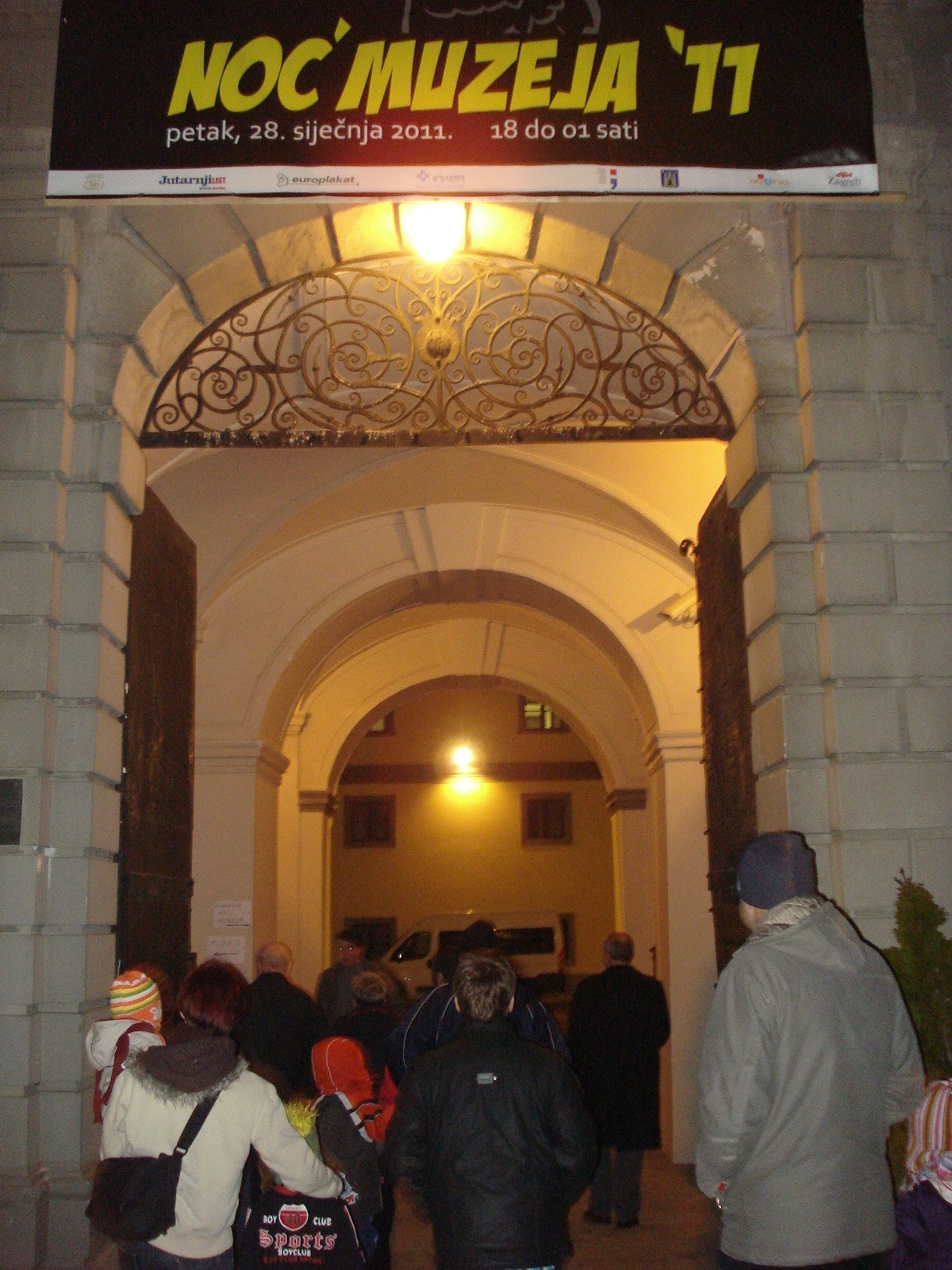
Museum entrance during the "Night of Museums" in 2011

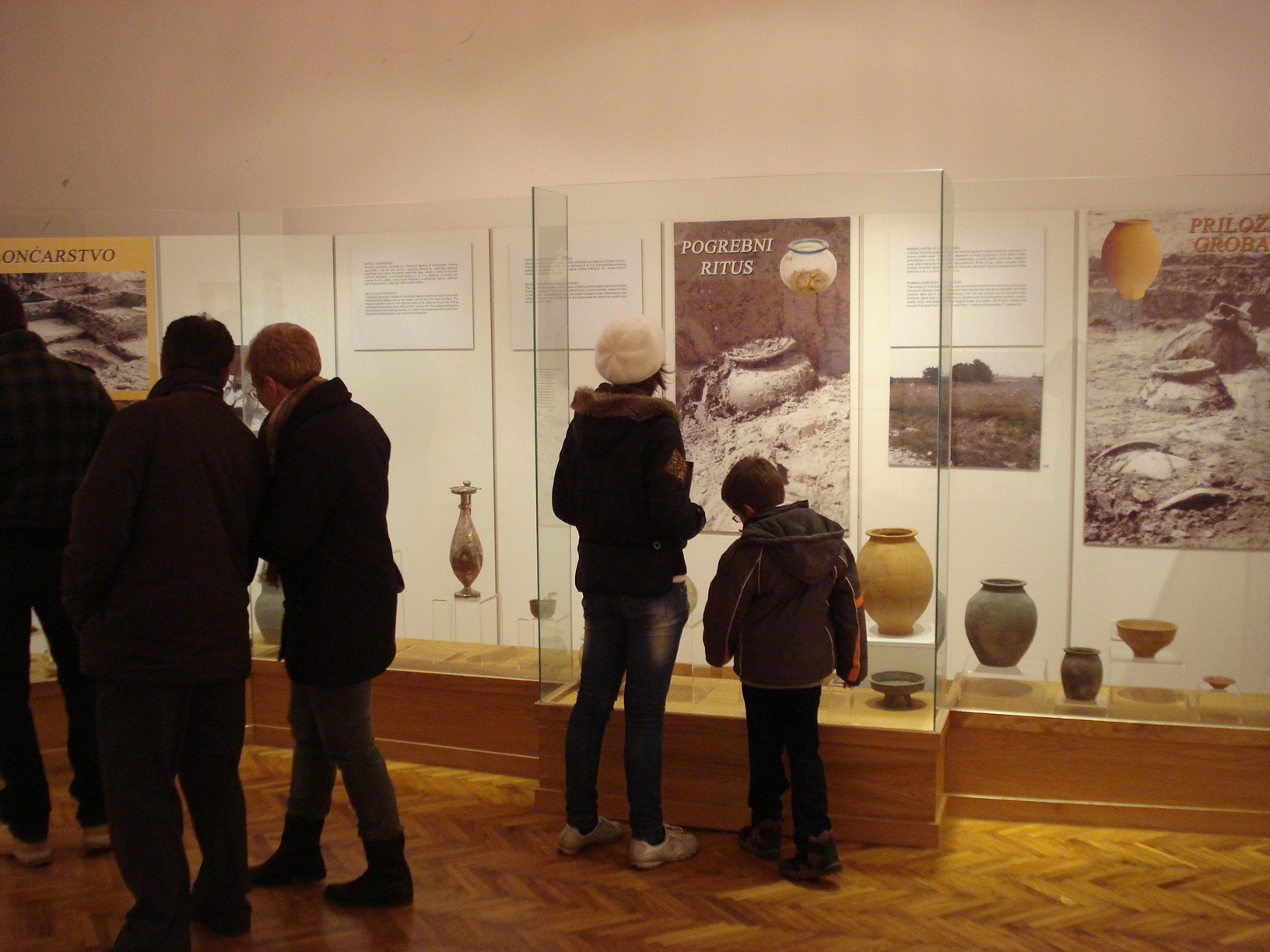
Visitors in the Archaeological Department

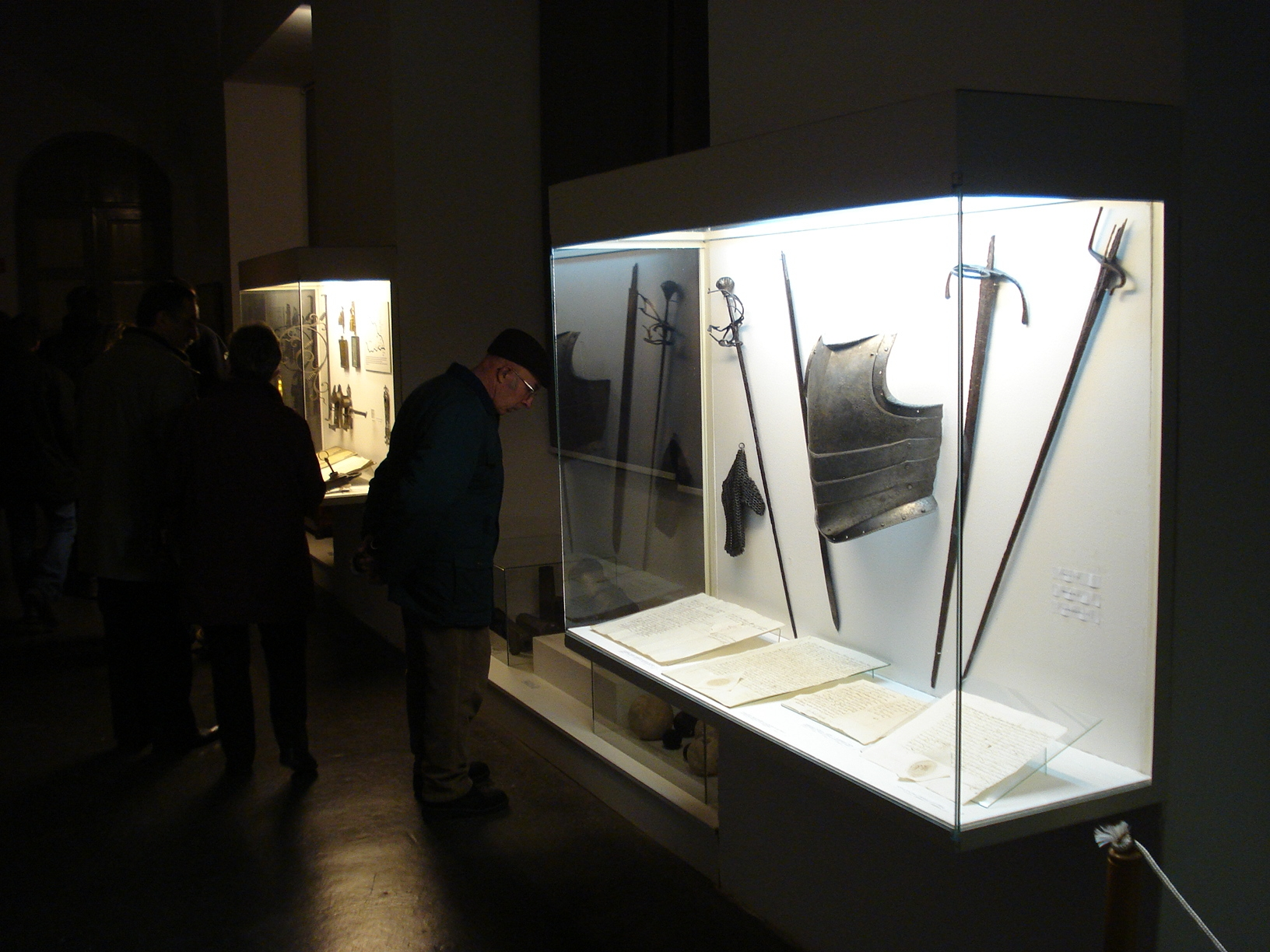
Showcases in a museum lobby

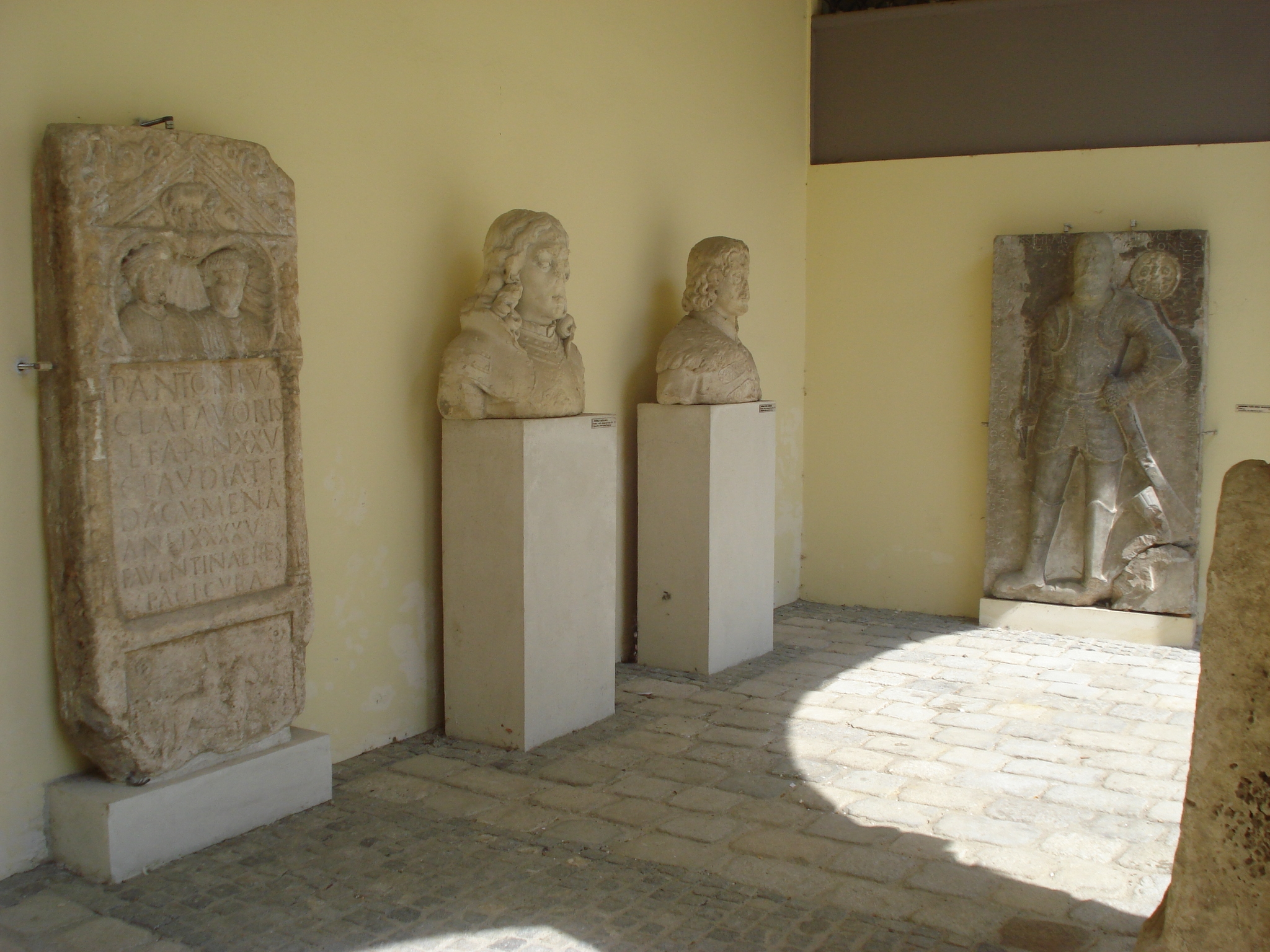
Part of the museum's Lapidaruim

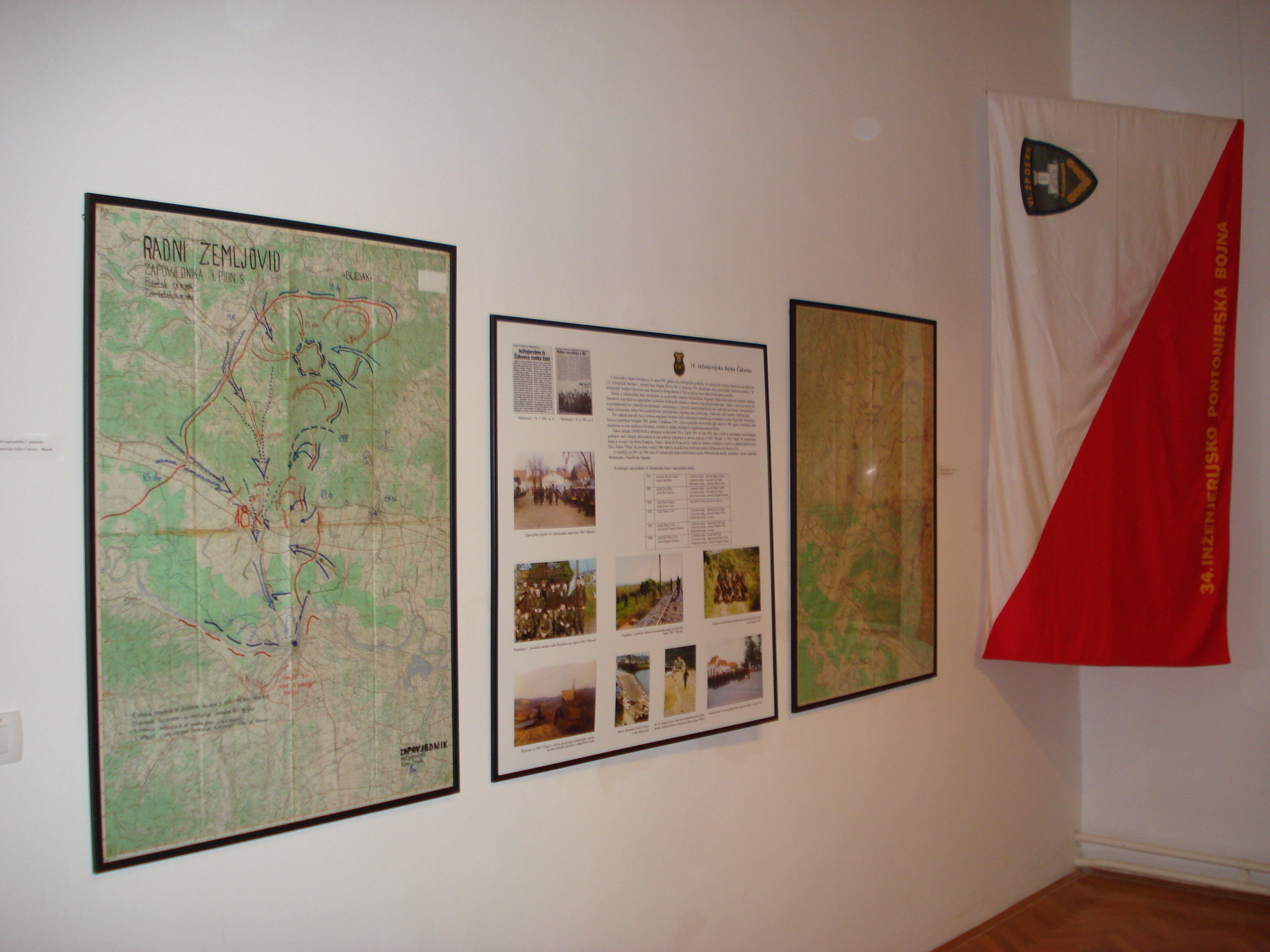
Part of the Croatian War of Independence collection

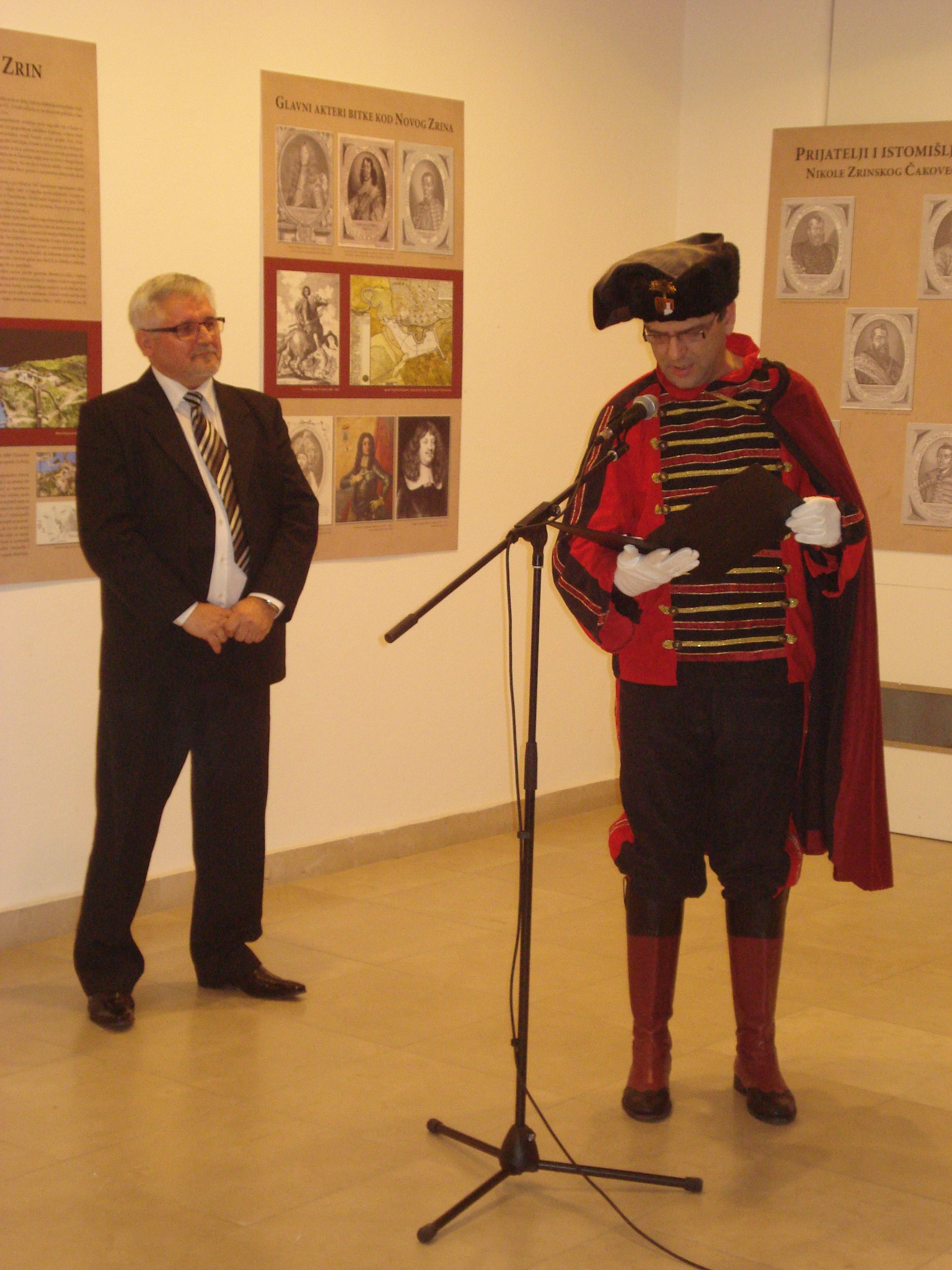
Nikola VII Zrinski exhibition on the occasion of his 350th death anniversary in a museum's exhibition hall

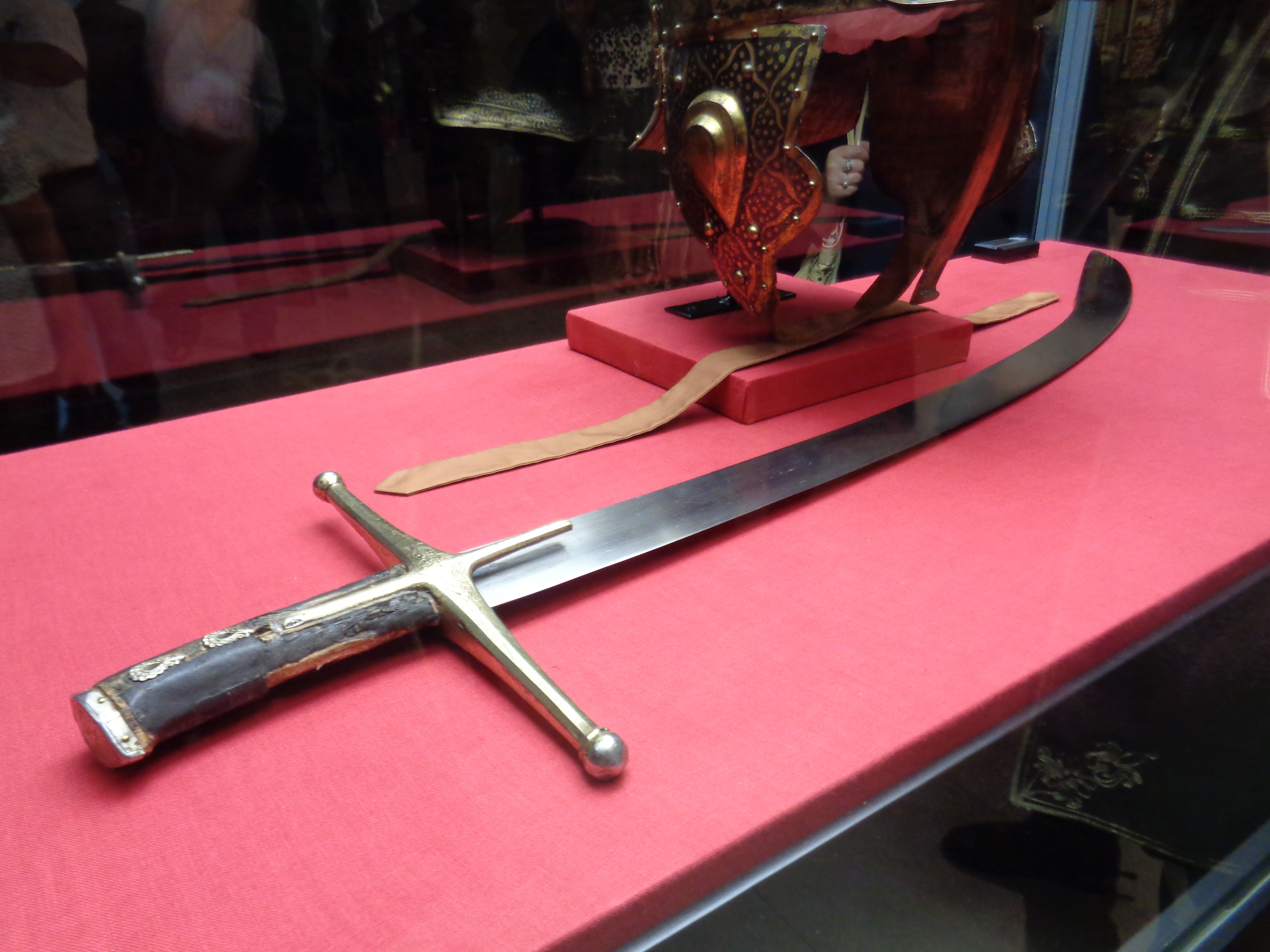
Sabre and helmet of Nikola IV Zrinski at an exhibition on the occasion of 450th anniversary of the Siege of Szigetvár, 2016

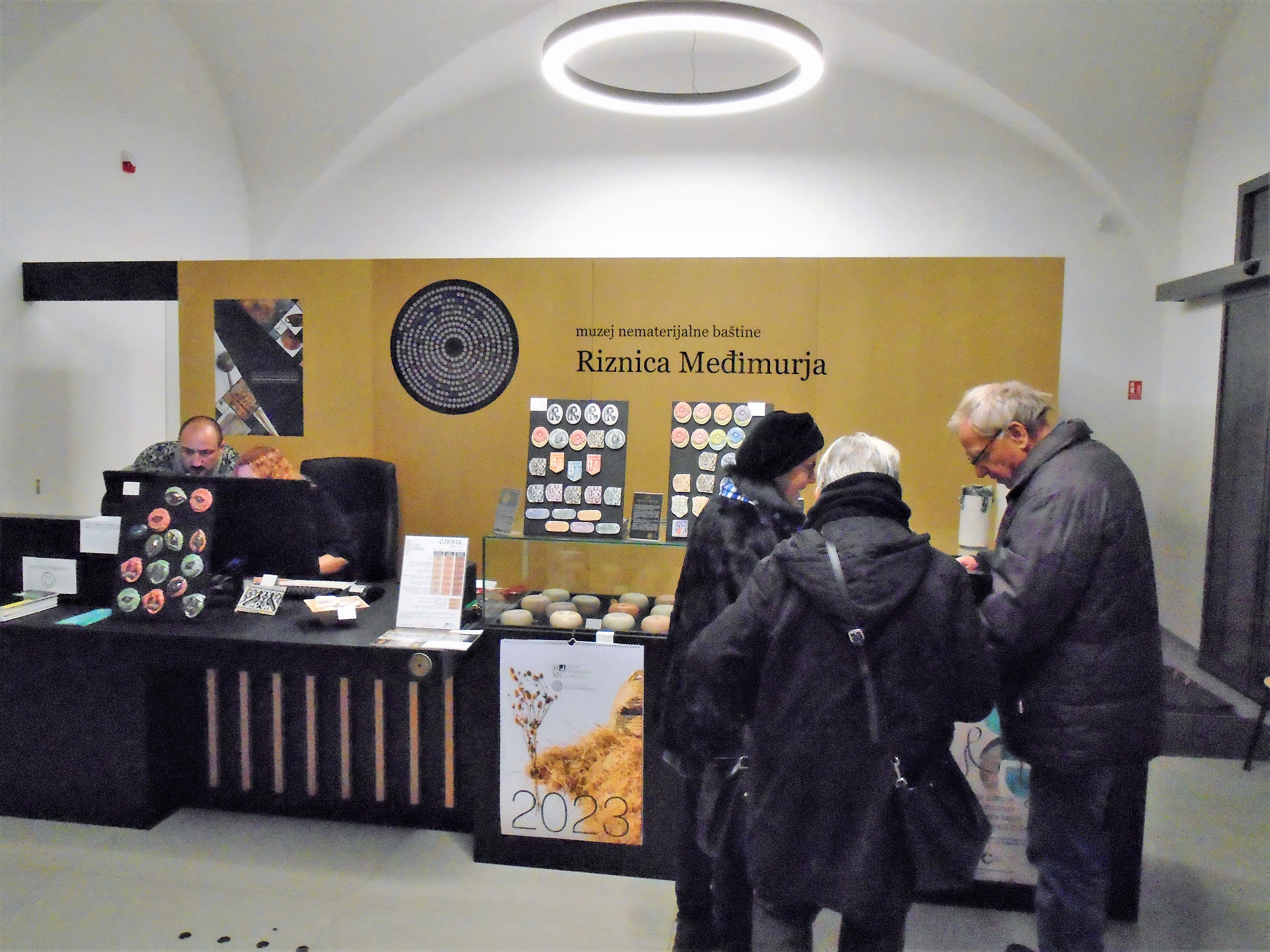
Reception room of the newly formed Treasury of Međimurje, a museum of intangible heritage

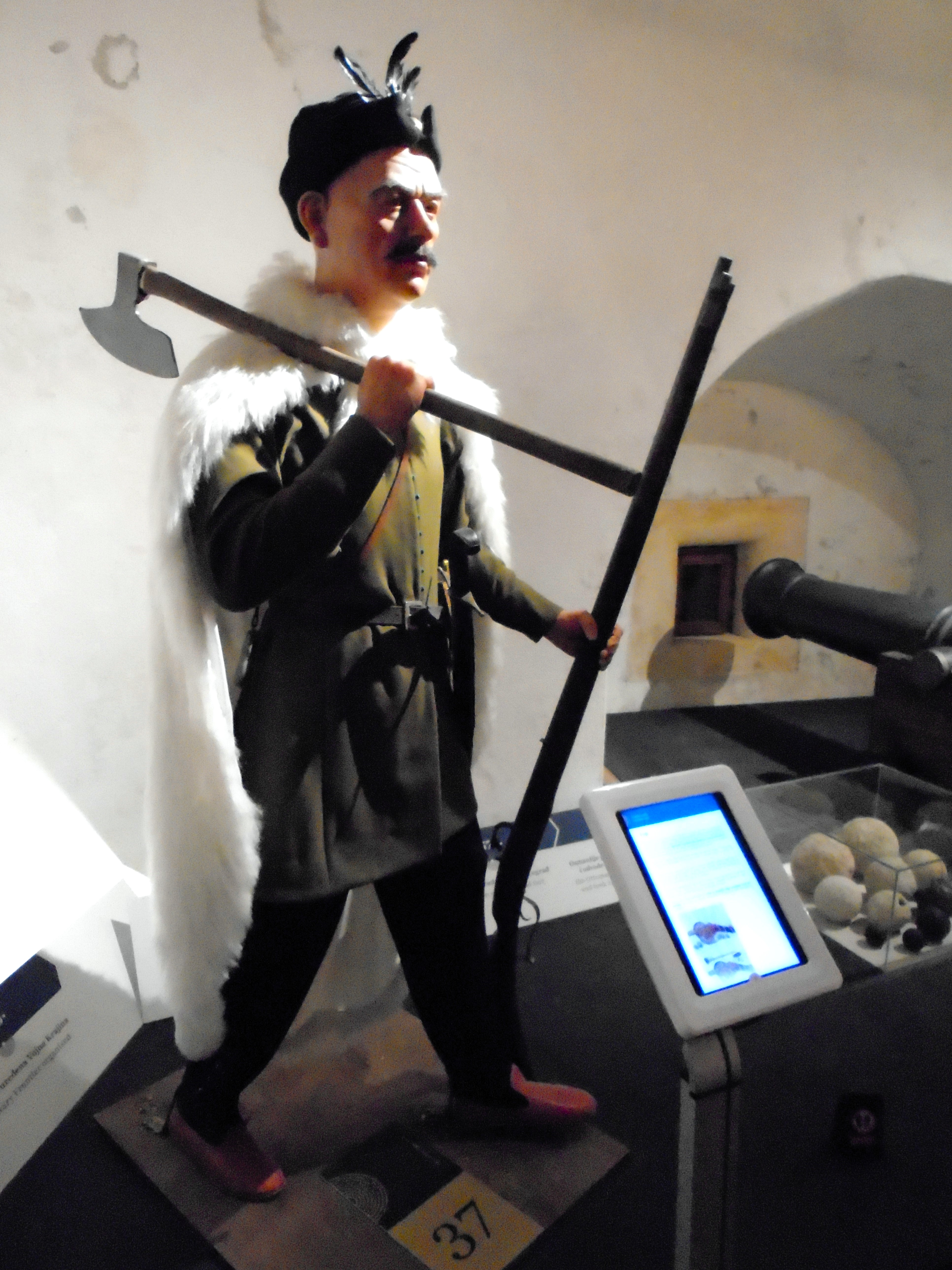
A haramija at an exhibition in the Museum

== See also ==
- List of museums in Croatia
- Long Night of Museums
