= Čakovec Castle =

- Stari grad Zrinskih (Croatian)
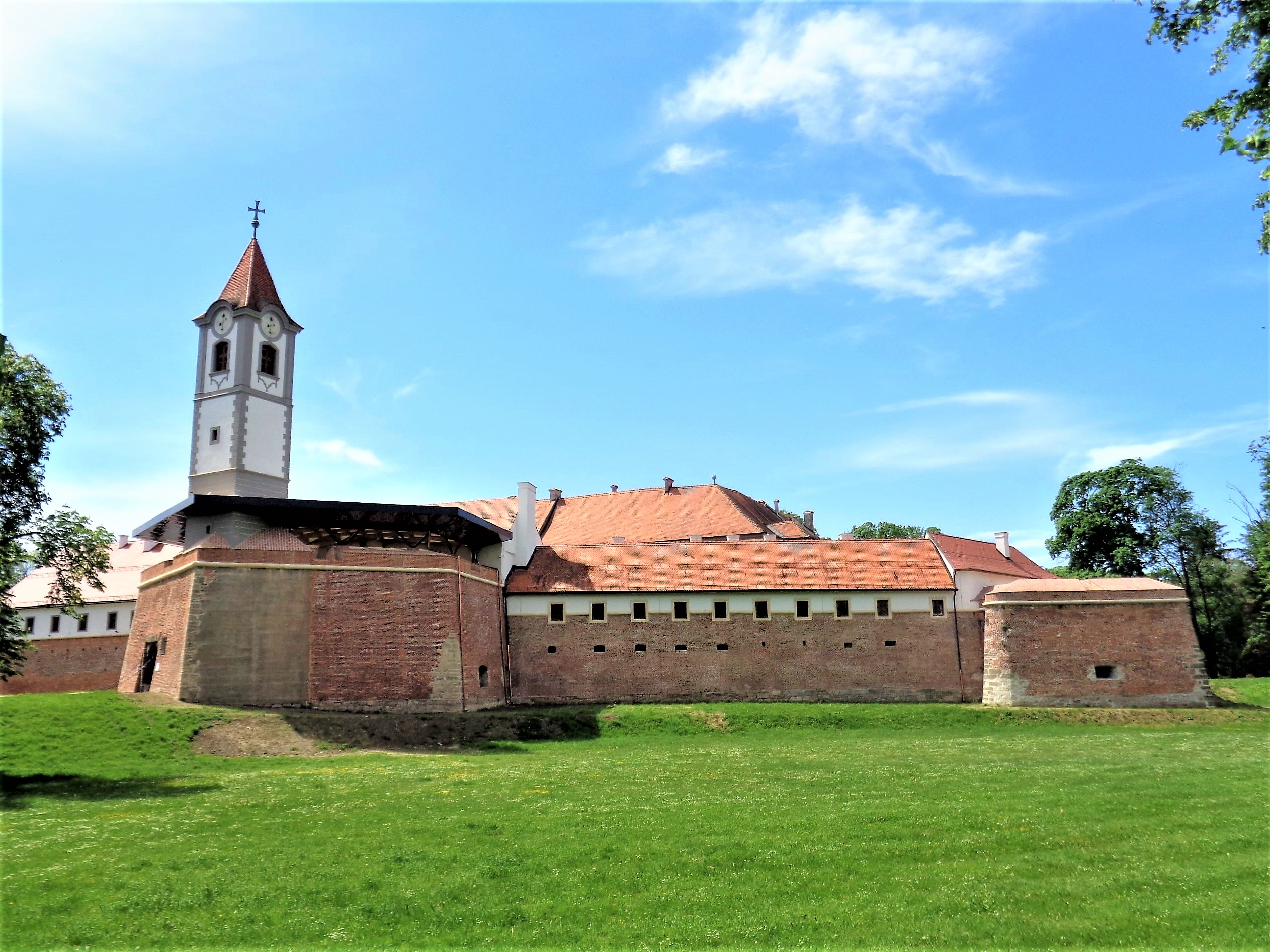
- North view of the Čakovec Castle

- Location within Croatia
- 46°23′20″N 16°25′55″E
- Location: Čakovec, Croatia

History
- Built: 13th century

Site notes
- Architectural style: Castle

Cultural Good of Croatia
- Official name: Kompleks Starog grada, Čakovec
- Type: Cultural
- Designated: November 19, 2007
- Reference no.: N-23

Čakovec Castle or Zrinski Castle (Croatian: Čakovečka utvrda or Stari grad Zrinskih or Hungarian: Csáktornyai vár or Zrínyi-kastély) is a medieval fortification in the middle of the town of Čakovec, the administrative seat of Međimurje County, northern Croatia.

The castle is located in the Zrinski Park, not far from the city's central square, and is the biggest fortification in Međimurje County. It was constructed of hewn stone and red brick, and, during its more than 7-century-long history, subjected to several reconstructions. Today it is partly restored.

The castle's main palace houses the Međimurje County Museum, the biggest museum in the county, and its atrium is also used as an outdoor theatre during the summer months. The place was the scene of the Zrinski-Frankopan conspiracy, a significant event in the history of Croatia.

On 19 November 2007 Čakovec Castle was classified as a protected cultural good in the Register of Cultural Goods of Croatia under No. N-23.

== History ==
The first fortification was built in the 13th century by Count Csák I Hahót, after whom the city of Čakovec is named. It was later owned by many other notable families, including the Counts of Althann, the House of Lacković, the Counts of Celje as well as the House of Ernušt, House of Zrinski, Keglević family, House of Feštetić and others.

Nikola IV Zrinski, Ban (viceroy) of Croatia and hero of Siget, was granted the castle together with the whole area of Međimurje on 12 March 1546 from King Ferdinand as a compensation for his battles against the Ottomans.

Nikola IV's great-grandson Nikola VII Zrinski, long-term Ban of Croatia and famous warrior against the Turks, was born in Čakovec Castle in 1620 to Juraj V Zrinski and Magdalena Zrinski née Széchy. In his castle, he established and owned a unique book collection named "Bibliotheca Zriniana".

In 1660 the castle was visited by Evliya Çelebi, Turkish traveller and writer, and in 1661 by Jacobus Tollius, Dutch philologist.

On 30 April 1738 castle was heavily damaged in an earthquake. It was immediately rebuilt and redesigned in baroque style, and it was given its present-day look. Water-filled moats, that entirely surrounded the castle, were later drained and filled with earth.

== See also ==
- Lacković
- Ernušt
- Zrinski
- Frankopan
- Zrinski-Frankopan conspiracy
