= Bibliotheca Zriniana =

Croatian 17th century book collection

- Zrinska knjižnica
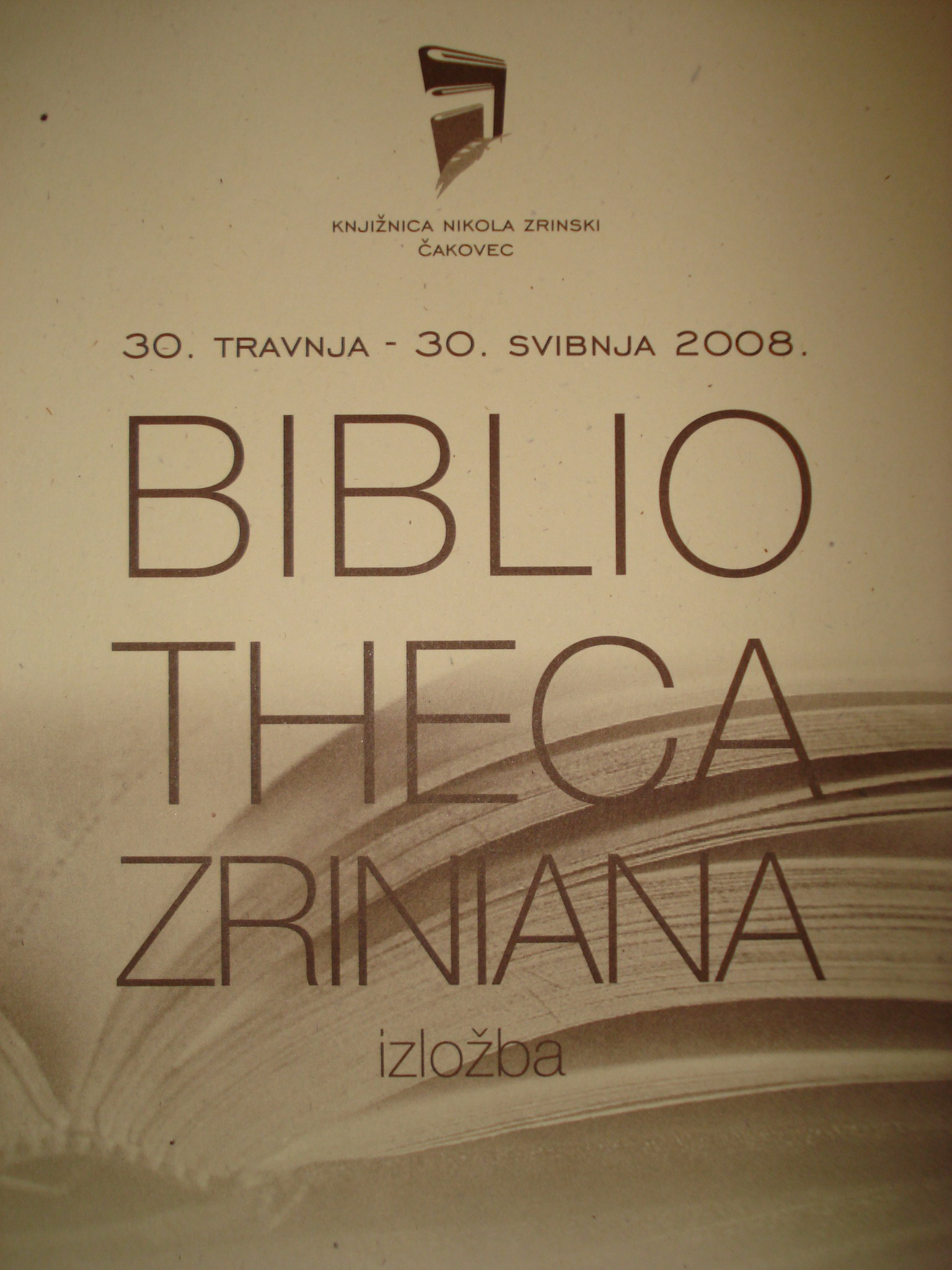
- Front cover of the 2008 Čakovec exhibition catalogue of Bibliotheca Zriniana
- Location: founded in Čakovec Castle, Kingdom of Croatia (Habsburg), today preserved in the National and University Library in Zagreb, Croatia
- Type: Private library
- Established: 1662; 364 years ago
- Architects: Nikola VII Zrinski, Ban (Viceroy) of Croatia

Collection
- Items collected: ancient Greek classics, ancient Roman classics, philosophy, history, military doctrine, architecture, economics, scholastics, geography, poems, etc.
- Size: 731

Other information
- Parent organisation: National and University Library in Zagreb
- Website: www.nsk.hr/en/

The Bibliotheca Zriniana (Croatian: Zrinska knjižnica) is the book collection of Nikola VII Zrinski, Ban (Viceroy) of Croatia, from the 17th century. It was established in Čakovec, the seat of the Zrinski noble family at that time. 1662 is considered to be the year of its founding, as its owner designed the specialized catalogue and had it printed. The collection was later moved several times and stayed outside Croatia for many years, but was finally bought in 1892 in Vienna and brought to Zagreb, where it is situated until now, largely preserved, in the Croatian National and University Library.

== History ==
The Renaissance-baroquee library in Čakovec began to form as early as the 16th century, i. e. from the time of Nikola VII Zrinski's ancestors. Most likely, this process started since his great-grandfather Nikola Šubić Zrinski (1508–1566), later followed by his grandfather Juraj (George) IV (1549–1603), his uncle Nikola VI (around 1570–1625) and father Juraj V (1599–1626), but the library was cataloged in 1662.

The catalogue was named Catalogus omnium librorum bibliothecae Chaktorniensis excellentissimi atque illustrissimi domini comitis Nicolai a Zrinio bani. Anno Domini 1662. die 10 octobris (translated: "Catalogue of all books in the Čakovec library of the distinguished and illustrious Count Nikola Zrinski, Banus. On October 10, 1662").

As professor Zvonimir Bartolić, president of Matica hrvatska (Matrix Croatica) branch in Čakovec, mentioned in the catalogue of 2008 exhibition of Zriniana in Čakovec, the number of books at that time amounted to more than 500 units. There were 431 listed books in the Catalogus..., plus about 100 volumes that were not mentioned in it. All the books recorded were divided into eleven thematic groups. After the death of Nikola Zrinski in 1664, his library was taken over by his wife Maria Sofia née Löbl († 1676) and his underage son Adam (1662–1691). During the turbulent years of the Magnate conspiracy, the two retreated from Zrinski Castle in Čakovec, first to Varaždin, then to Virovitica and finally to Vienna. They took the library with them and thus the Zriniana was protected from the danger of being plundered when the magnates' conspiracy was violently ended.

Since Adam Zrinski was shot in 1691 in the Battle of Slankamen, his widow Maria Katarina née Lamberg remarried Count Maximilian Arnošt II Vlašim from Moravian Vöttau (Bitov in today's Czech Republic). Zrinski's library remained in the Bítov Castle for nearly two centuries. Almost forgotten in a distant spare room, it was "rediscovered" again in 1873 and later sold to the Viennese antiquarian Samuel Kende in 1890. He prepared and published a thorough description of the Bibliotheca Zriniana in German, which he sent to the most important Hungarian libraries as an auction catalogue.

Although Hungarian libraries were interested in buying the collection, the Croatian state government reacted more quickly and skilfully and eventually bought it in 1892/93 for 12,000 Forint. The Zriniana was immediately transported from Vienna to Zagreb and housed in what was then the Croatian Royal University Library, which later became a part of today's National and University Library.

== Library contents ==
Since it was set up, the Bibliotheca Zriniana has been continually expanded and its stock of books has changed. The inheritance of Nikola Zrinski was extended with the books of his brother Petar (1621–1671), sister-in-law Katarina (1625–1673) and son Adam. According to research, it was found that 95 books belonged to spouses Petar and Katarina Zrinski, and 45 books to Adam. Adam's inheritance is said to have contained over 800 books in total. Today's inventory includes 424 so-called signature marks, exclusively printed books, i.e. excluding the 29 manuscripts found under separate call numbers.

According to recent, long-term research, Croatian and Hungarian librarians and historians have concluded that the entire stock of books in the Bibliotheca Zriniana includes 731 library units. The largest part of it is located in Zagreb and the rest is scattered in various libraries and archives in Europe.

In addition to the books inherited from his ancestors, Nikola Zrinski supplemented his family library with books from various sources that were printed in many well-known printing places in Central and Western Europe, such as Vienna, Paris, Venice, Bologna, Rome, Antwerp, Amsterdam, Frankfurt, Cologne, Strasbourg and others. The books were mostly written in Latin, but also in Italian, German, Croatian, Hungarian, French, etc.

In today's preserved collection, kept in the Croatian National and University Library (424 units), there are works of the Ancient Greek classical (e.g. Iliad and Odyssey) and the ancient Roman literature (Valerius Maximus, Pliny the Elder, Horace, Virgil, Julius Caesar etc.), then some copies of the Bible, the works of the Italian late medieval writers (Ludovico Ariosto, Giovanni Boccaccio, Dante Alighieri, Francesco Petrarca), as well as writers from other countries (such as Francis Bacon or Laurentius Beyerlinck) alongside local authors (Nikola Zrinski with his "Siren of the Adriatic Sea", Katarina Zrinski with her “Putni tovaruš” (Travel Companion), Franjo Črnko with the “Siege of the City of Sigetvar”, Franjo Glavinić with the “Story of Trsat”, Mavro Orbini with the “Kingdom of the Slavs”, etc.). Particularly interesting is a collection of poems by Pope Urban VIII (from before his papacy), which Nikola Zrinski received personally from the author in Rome in 1636.

Besides ’’Belles-lettres’’ books, the Zrinski library has books concerning history, military affairs, philosophy, economy, geography (including some atlases), architecture, etc. Finally, the library holds several volumes of rare works, including the valuable manuscripts. One of them is a handwritten epic called the "Siren of the Adriatic Sea" by the owner of the library.

To commemorate the important collection of books that were once located in the residence of the Zrinskis in the town of Čakovec, the former socialist "People's Library and Reading Room Čakovec" was in the 1980s renamed “Nikola Zrinski Library“ Čakovec.

== See also ==
- List of libraries by country
- List of national and state libraries
