= Ladislav Kralj Međimurec =

Croatian painter and engraver

Ladislav Kralj-Međimurec (Čakovec, 24 April 1891 – 9 February 1976) was a Croatian painter and engraver. In the history of Croatian painting he is best known for his landscapes of his home county, Međimurje, and Zagorje, which he created throughout his entire life. Although during his lifetime his art was little known to other artists and art critics, today it has been recognized that the works of Kralj-Međimurec represent a valuable contribution to the history of Croatian visual arts of the twentieth century.

The artist was born as Ladislav Kralj in Čakovec in 1891. He decided to take the name Međimurec as a sign of love for his native soil. Kralj-Međimurec began his artistic education at the academy in Budapest in 1910, which he was forced to abandon in 1912 because he was recruited for the army. During the First World War, he was sent to the front, where he was wounded. After his recovery at the hospital in Miskolec, he returned to Čakovec, where he met Ivan Novak, a literary writer and active local politician who helped him continue with his studies. Kralj-Međimurec finished his education at the academy in Vienna (1922–1924) under the tutorship of Rudolf Jettmar.

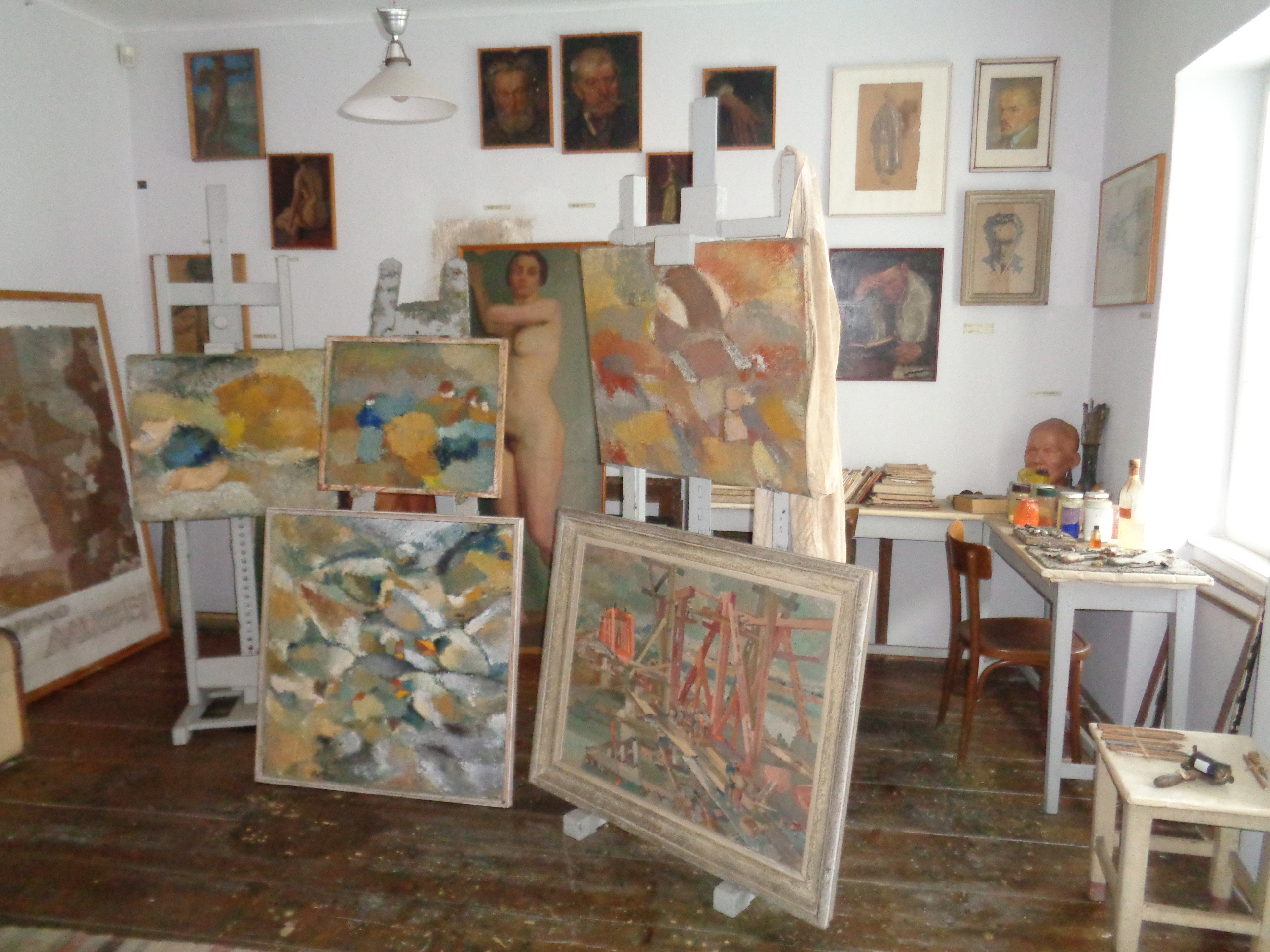
Atelier in the artist's Memorial collection of the Međimurje County Museum

In his earliest works from the early 1920s, Kralj-Međimurec rejected any type of idealization and painted his canvases using wide brushstrokes. During his studies in Vienna, he started the collection of etchings depicting his hometown Čakovec, which he finished and exhibited in 1926 at the Ulrich Gallery in Zagreb. From 1926 to 1929 he worked as an art teacher in Karlovac and Nova Gradiška, until he was offered the same position at the grammar school in Varaždin. During the late 1920s and early 1930s, he created two more collections of etchings, “Dalmacija” (1926–1928) and “Varaždin” (1929–1932), and painted canvases depicting social themes (“Radnici na pruzi”, 1927, “Međimurka”, 1933), whose quality kept pace with the works of contemporary Croatian artists of critical realism.

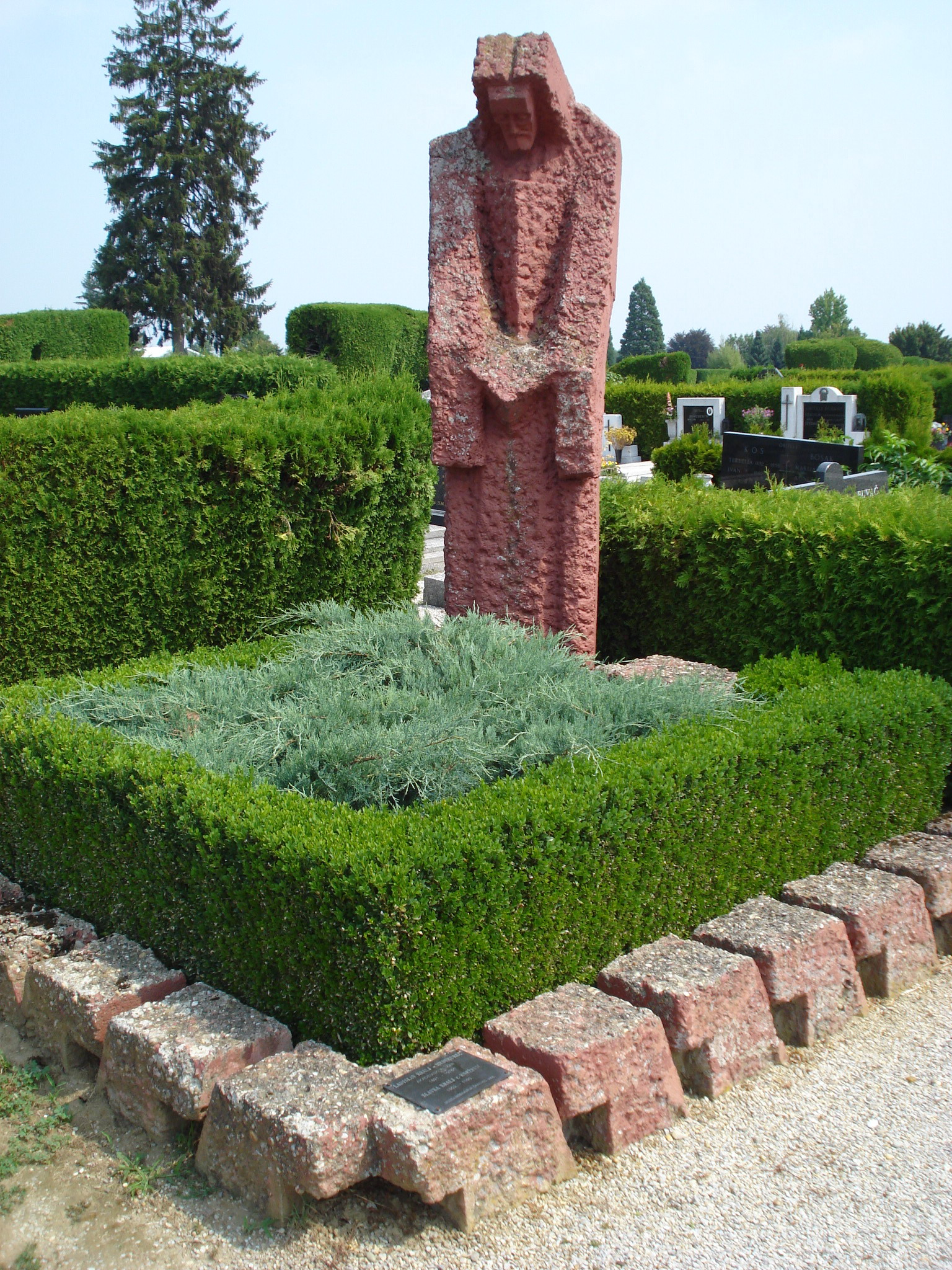
Ladislav Kralj-Međimurec grave at Čakovec Cemetery

During the Second World War, Kralj-Međimurec lived solitarily in a small village of Krkanec near Varaždin, where he devoted most of his time to painting landscapes, which remained his most dominant theme until his death in 1976. During the early 1940s, he worked with dark tones of brown, green, and yellow, applying them onto the canvas using wide strokes (“Zagorsko dvorište”, “Stari škedenj”). After the war, he moved back to Čakovec, where his art took a new turn. During the so-called Šenkovec phase (1946–1956), he began to paint his landscapes using short strokes of impasto – often applying it directly with a painting-knife – which gave his canvases a granulated effect (“Seosko dvorište”, 1954). During the next two phases, the so-called Mihovljan (1956–1961) and Štrigova phase (1961–1968), the form of his landscapes gradually became simpler, and his way of painting changed from using blotches of paint to creating planes of colour, giving his landscapes a post-impressionist touch (“Štrigova” and “Gornje Međimurje”, 1961).

During his last years, Kralj-Međimurec continued to experiment with the form of his landscapes, moving even closer to abstraction (“Bezimeno cvijeće”). Unfortunately, he was stopped in his endeavours in 1976, when he died in his home town.
