= Zrinski Park =

Park in Čakovec, Croatia

- Interactive map of Zrinski Park
- Location: Čakovec, Croatia
- Coordinates: 46°23′19″N 16°25′53″E
- Area: c. 13.5 hectares (33 acres)

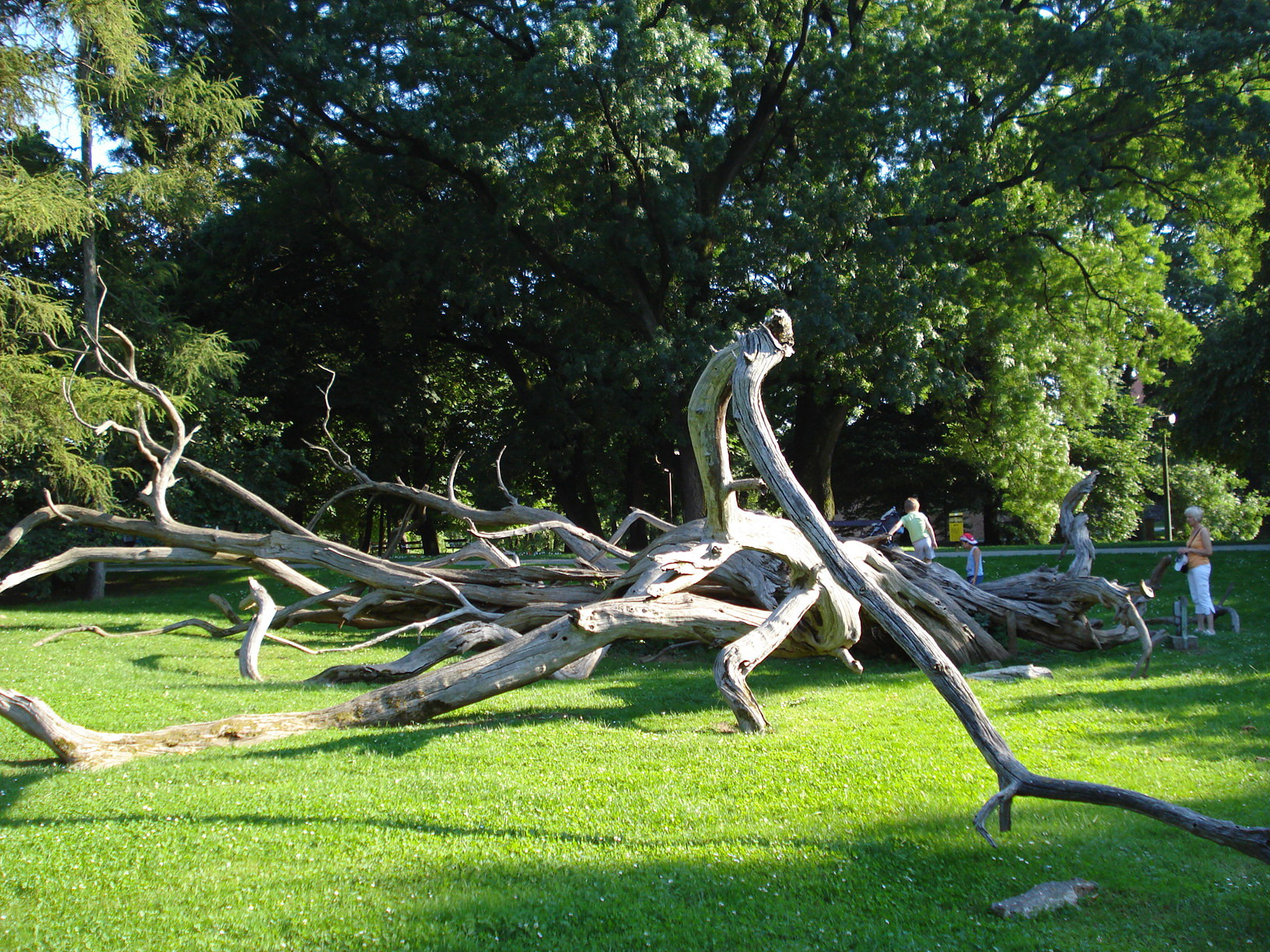
The so-called "Old black locust" in Zrinski-Park

Zrinski Park (Croatian: Perivoj Zrinskih) is situated in downtown Čakovec, northern Croatia, close to the central square.

The area had been a part of the city fortification since the 13th century. The castle, located in the centre of the Park, was owned by the Zrinski family between the 16th and the 18th century. It is known today as the "Old Town of the Zrinskis" (Croatian: Stari grad Zrinskih) and is an important landmark.

== Gallery ==
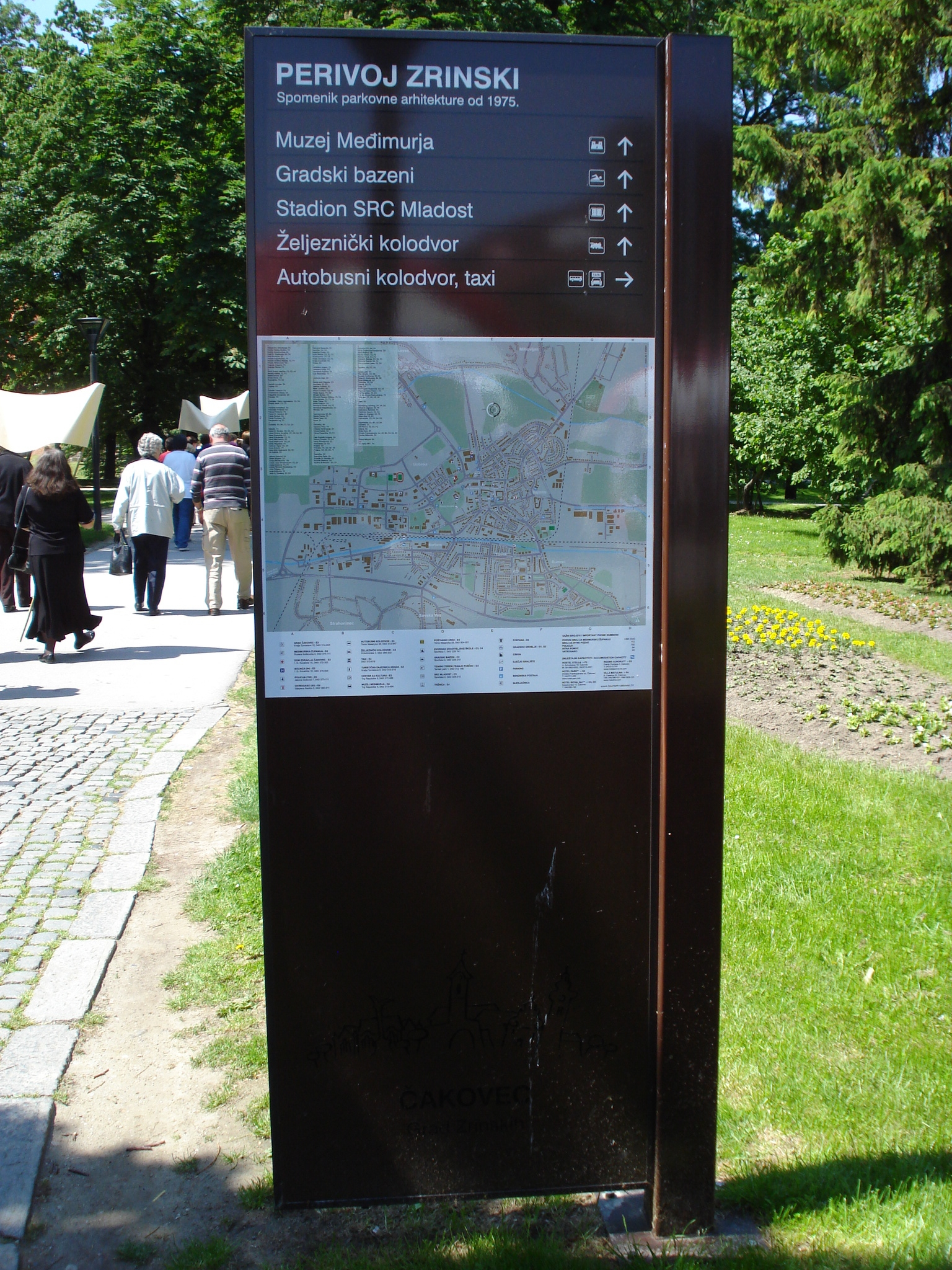
Entrance information board

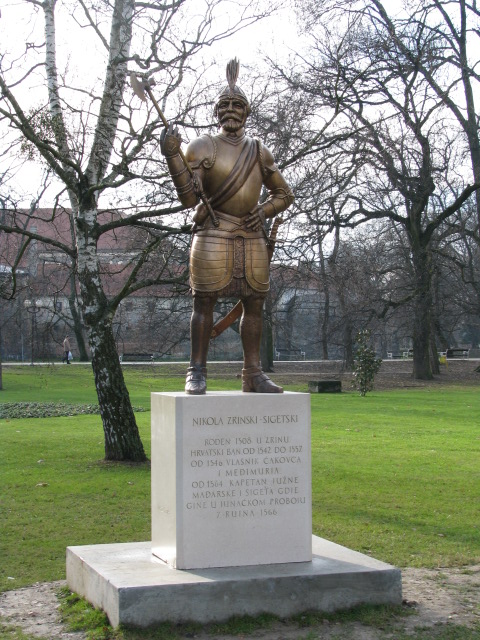
A statue of Nikola IV Zrinski in the park

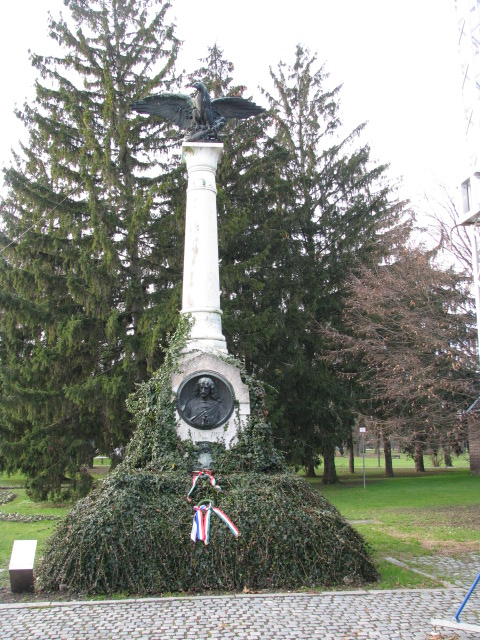
Nikola VII Zrinski monument at the entrance of the Park

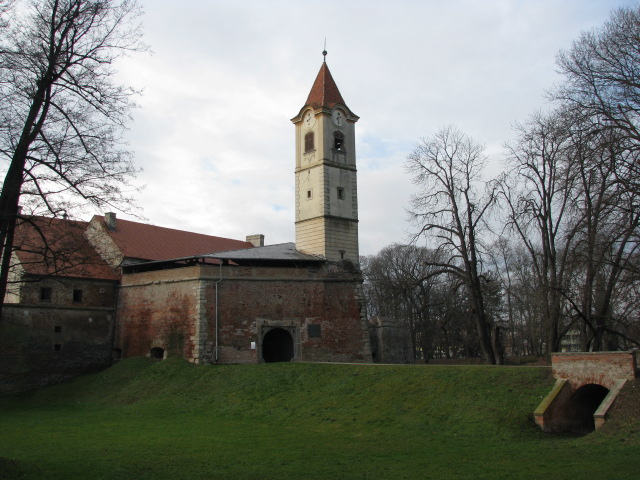
Čakovec Castle in the centre of the Park

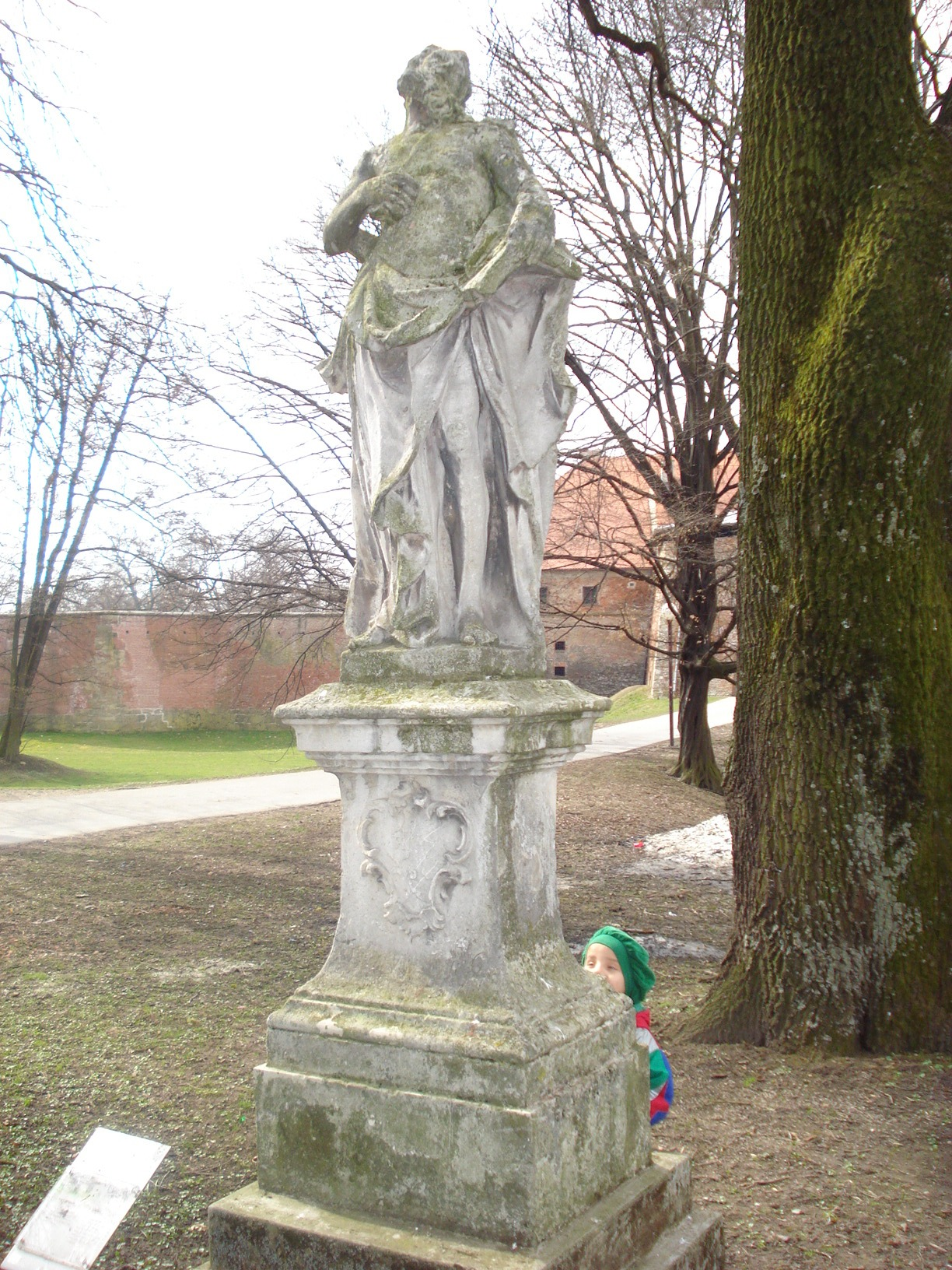
A statue of Saint Jerome from 1766

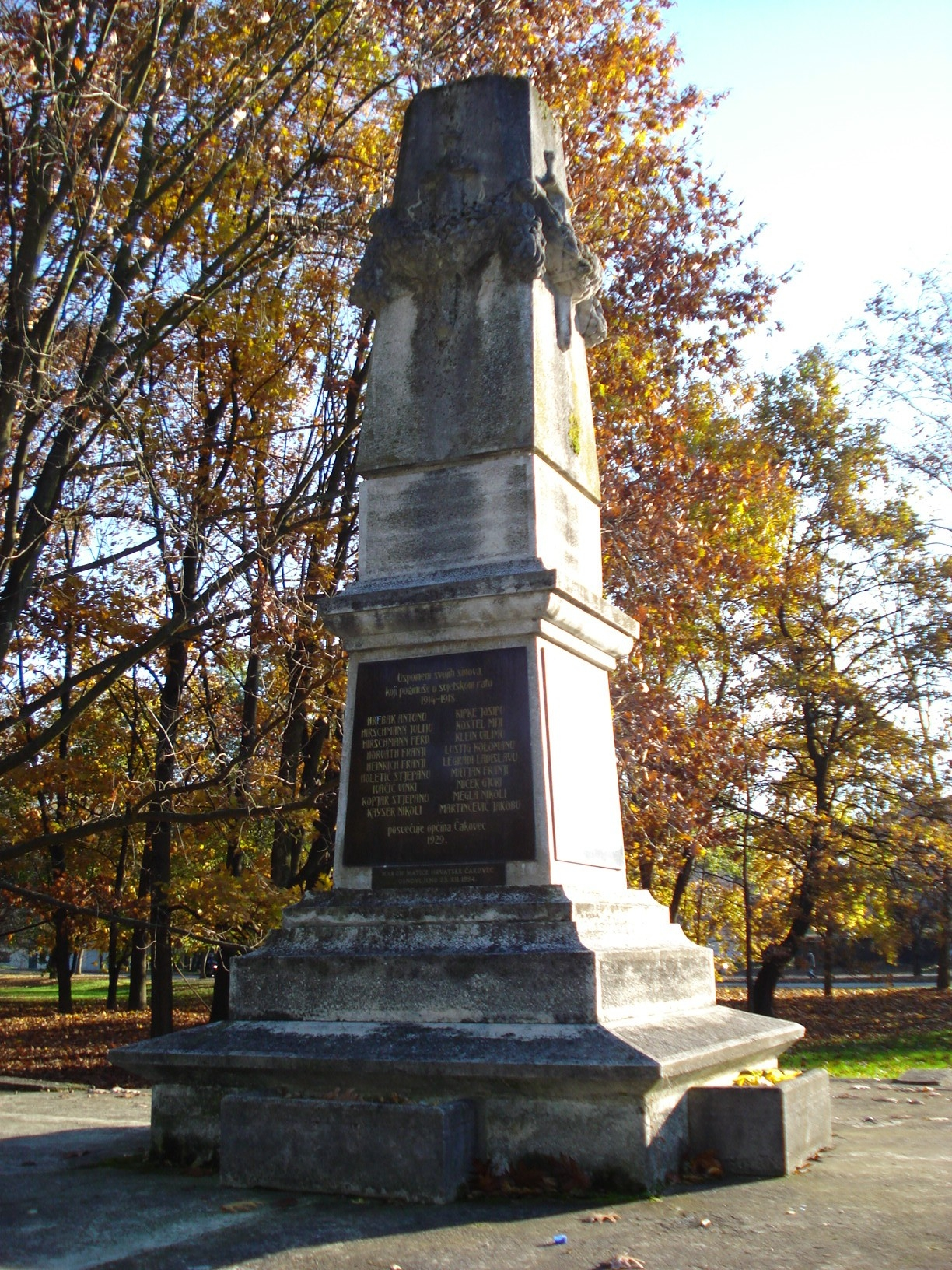
Memorial to fallen soldiers in World War I

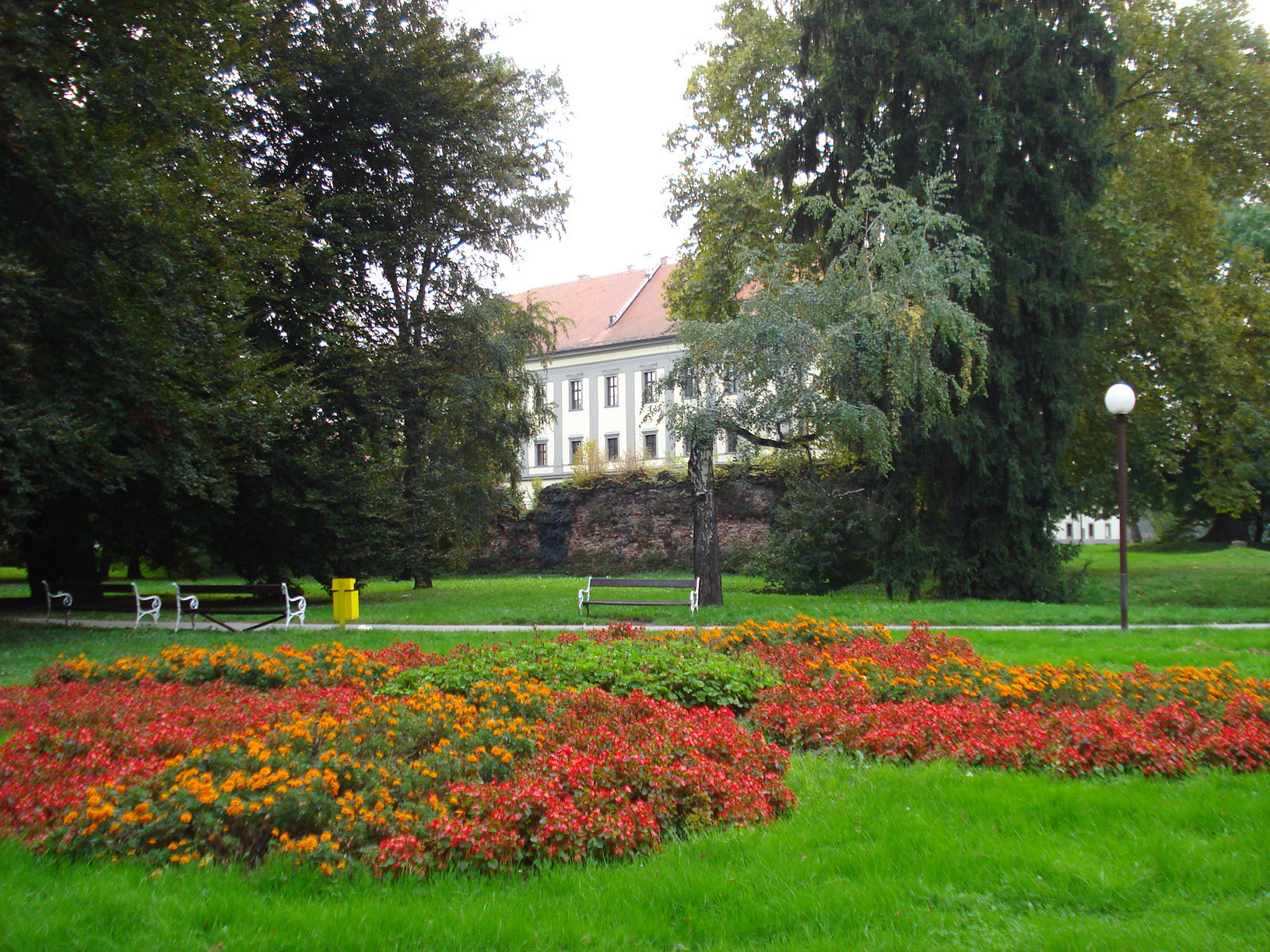
Part of the Park with the Zrinski palace in background

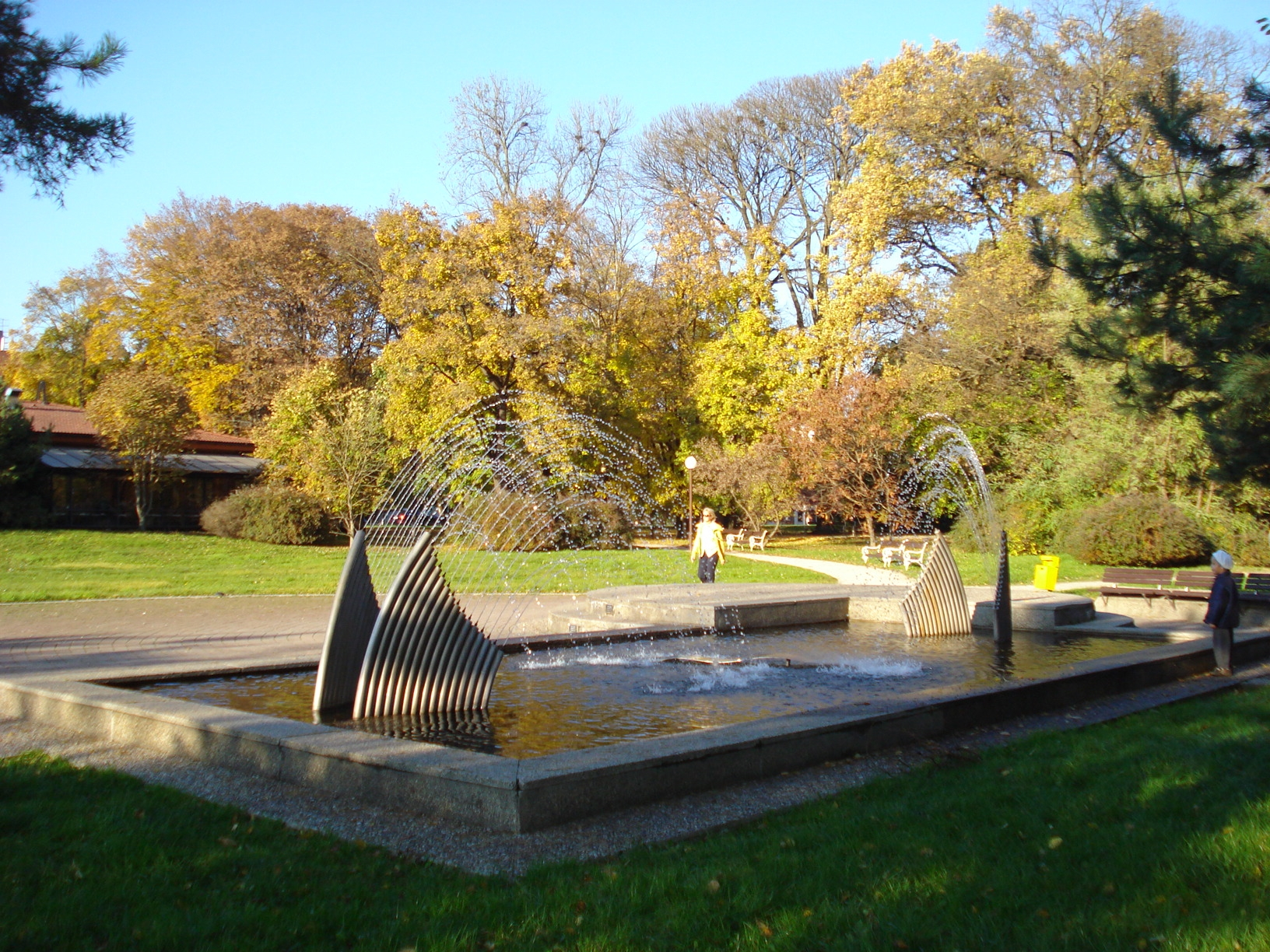
Fountain in the autumn

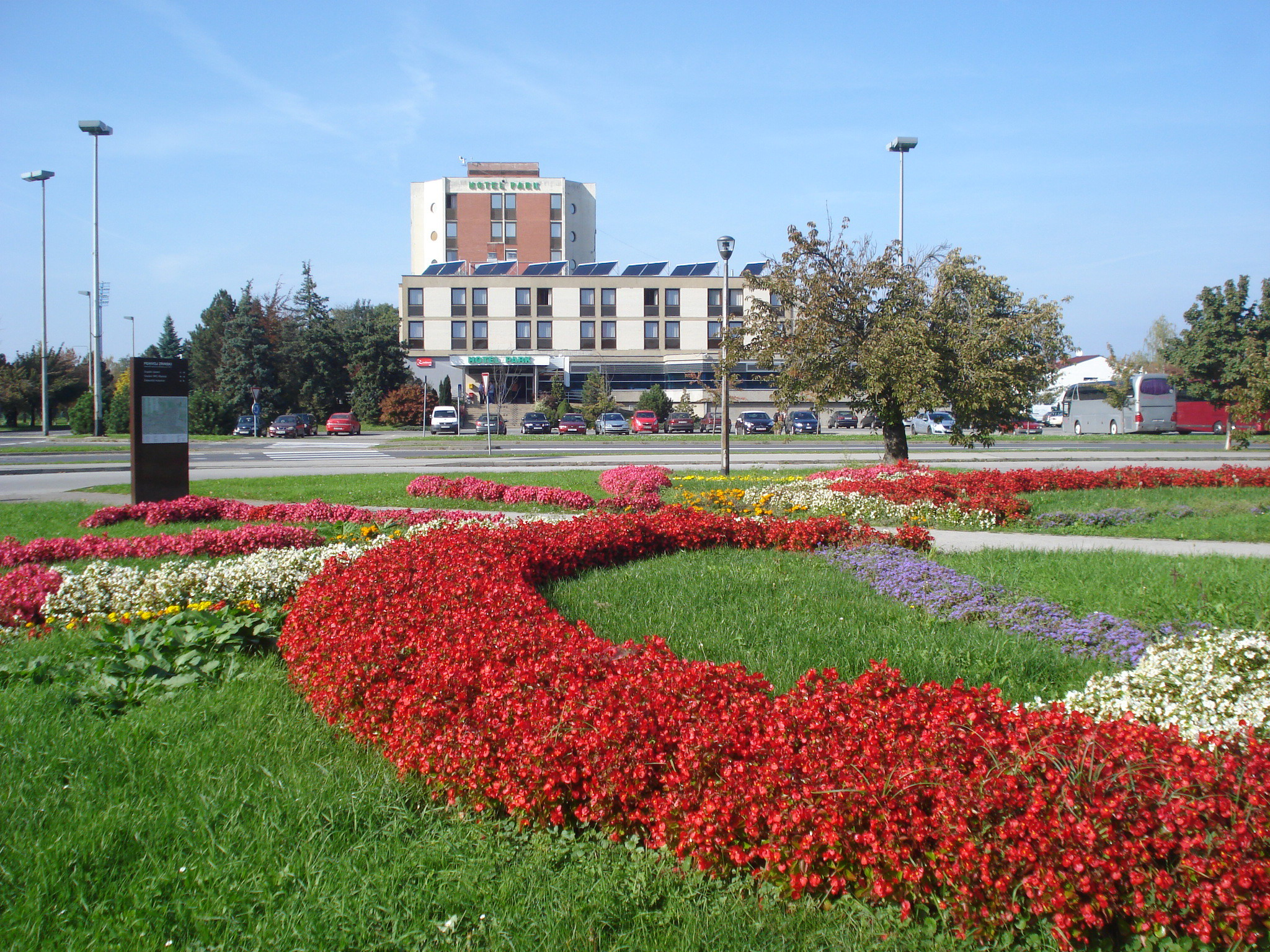
Part of the Park with the "Park Hotel" in background
