= Trnava (Međimurje) =

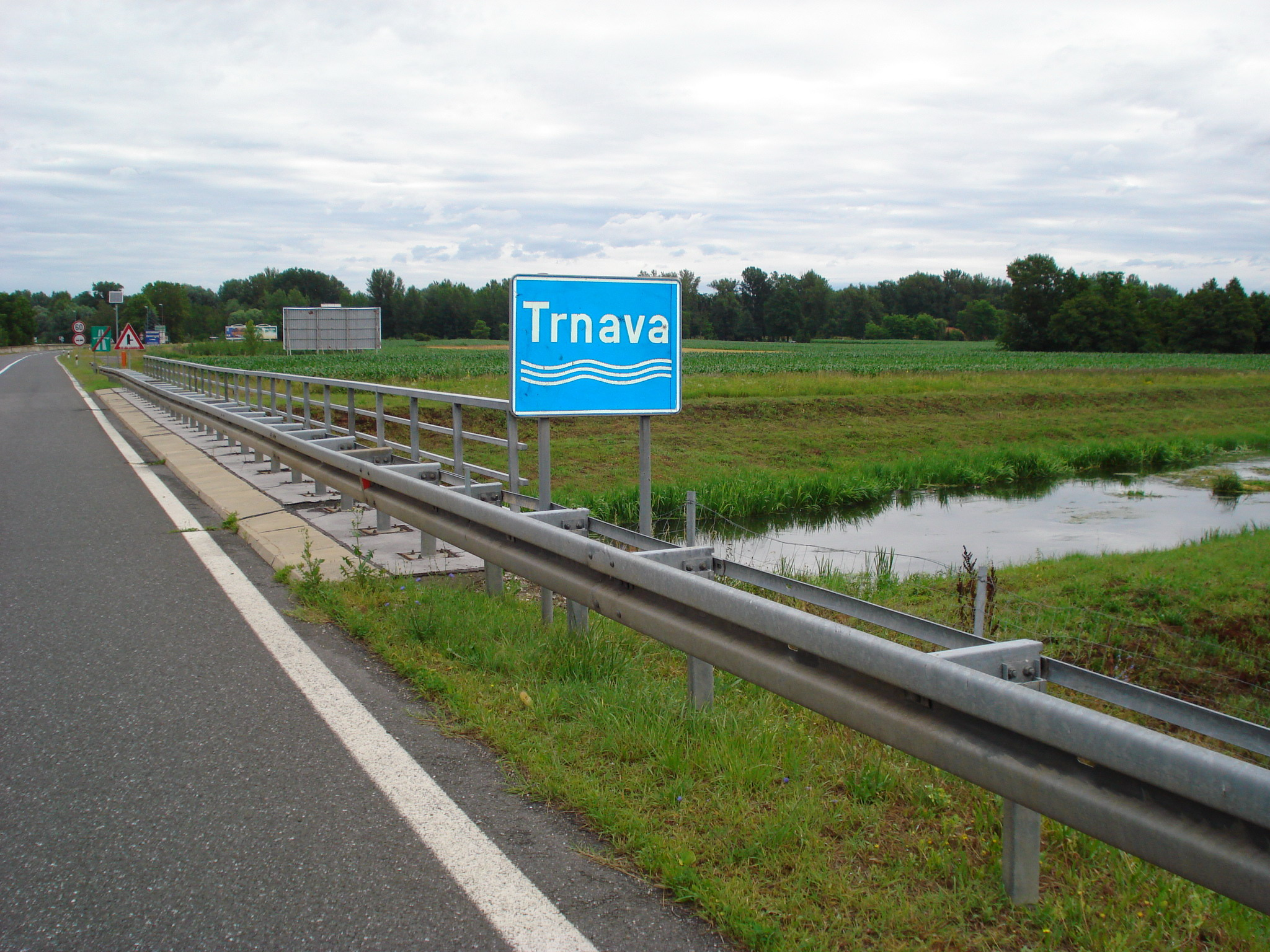
- Bridge across the Trnava river at Goričan

Location
- Country: Croatia
- City: Čakovec

Physical characteristics
- Source: at Vukanovec village
  - location: Gornji Mihaljevec municipality, Međimurje County, Croatia
  - coordinates: 46°27′0″N 16°19′40″E
  - elevation: 300 m (980 ft)
- Mouth: Mura near Goričan, Međimurje County, Croatia
  - location: Croatia
  - coordinates: 46°23′30″N 16°43′0″E
  - elevation: 140 m (460 ft)
- Length: 47 km (29 mi)
- Basin size: 250 km^{2} (97 sq mi)

Basin features
- River system: Danube basin
- Tributaries
  - left: brooks Dragoslavec, Goričica, Pleškovec, Knezovec, Hrebec, Brezje, Boščak, Murščak and Korenatica
  - right: brooks Kopenec and Sratka
- Progression: Mur→ Drava→ Danube→ Black Sea

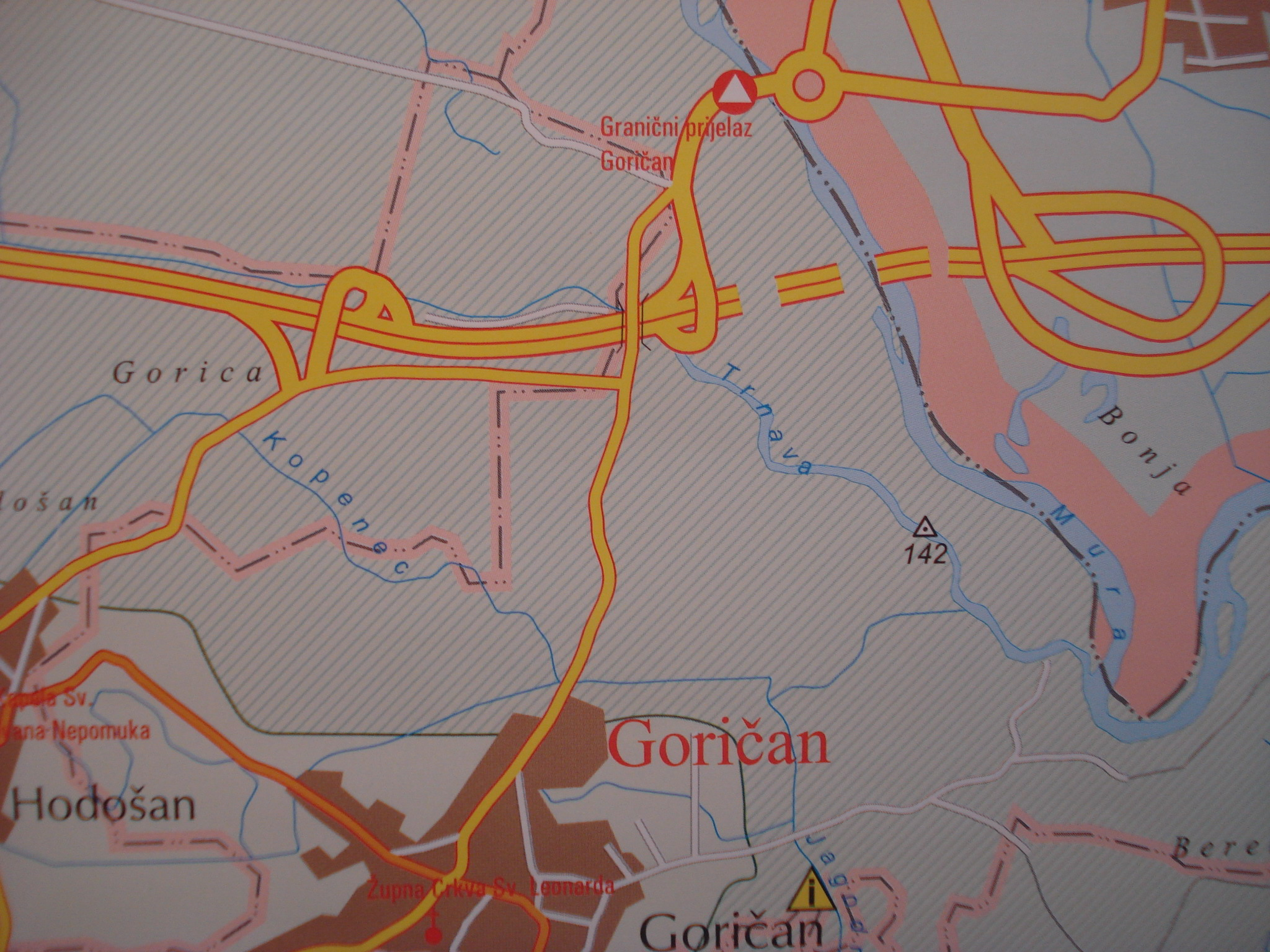
Part of the Međimurje County map showing the lower course and mouth of Trnava

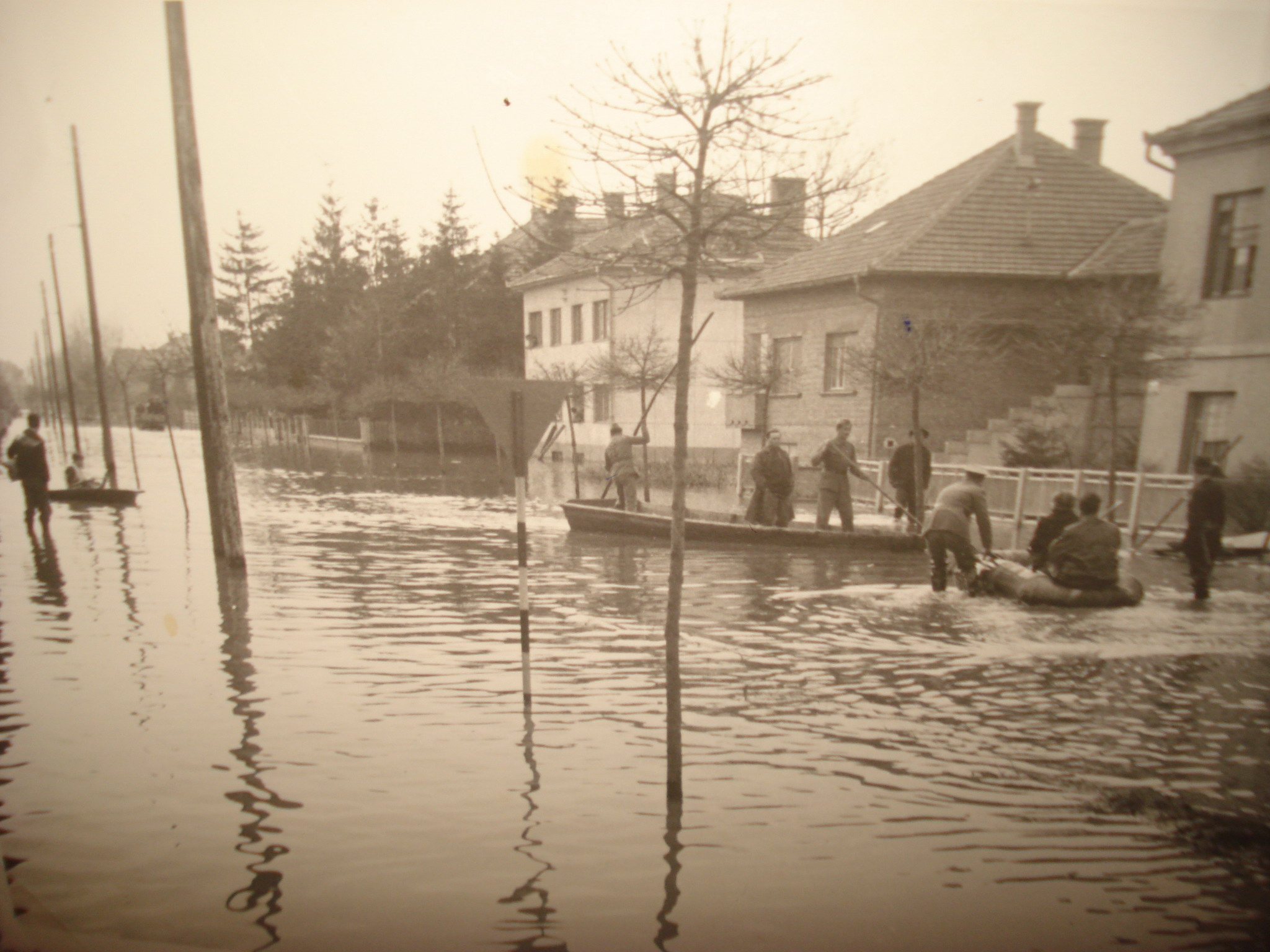
March 1963 flooding of Čakovec

The Trnava is a river in northern Croatia, a right tributary of the Mura River and the last significant one to flow into Mura before its confluence with Drava. It flows through Međimurje County.

== Geography and hydrography ==
The river is 46,9 km (29,14 mi) long and its watershed drains an area of about 250 km^{2} (96,5 sq.mi). It has its source at an elevation of 300 meters near the village of Vukanovec in the Gornji Mihaljevec municipality, which is situated in the hilly, northwestern part of the County. The upper course of the river flows southwards, then turns by the village of Macinec to the east. It flows further as a slow-moving plain stream, mouthing into the Mura. The river mouth is located near the village of Goričan at an elevation of 140 meters.

Trnava is incorporated into the water retention ponds' and irrigation canal network of Međimurje County. Water level of the river can fluctuate throughout the year, being occasionally very low during periods of drought and sometimes extremely high after heavier rains.

Throughout its course, Trnava receives the waters of many tributaries (most of them coming from the left side, like Dragoslavec, Goričica, Pleškovec, Knezovec, Hrebec, Brezje, Boščak, Murščak, Korenatica, and a few of them from the right side, like Kopenec and Sratka), becomes wider, deeper and slower, and finally empties into the Mura.

Along its banks is a chain of villages (Gornji Mihaljevec, Macinec, Nedelišće, Pribislavec, Štefanec, Mala Subotica, Palovec, Strelec, Držimurec, Turčišće) as well as the town of Čakovec, the County seat.

== History ==
In the past, Trnava was a left tributary of the Drava River, but following the occasional changes of watercourses of the Drava and Mura in many centuries ago (due to flooding) it was cut through by Mura, becoming the latter's right tributary. The lower course of the river still exists today and is called Stara Trnava (=Old Trnava), being incorporated into the Bistrec-Rakovnica water canal network, which empties into the Drava east of Donja Dubrava.

During past centuries Trnava was important for filling up the moats around the Zrinski Castle in Čakovec. In the first half of the 20th century the river was not yet properly regulated and this often led to flooding. The last serious flood in Čakovec occurred on 12 March 1963. Since then the river banks have been reconstructed and raised, so that flooding stopped.

== Gallery ==
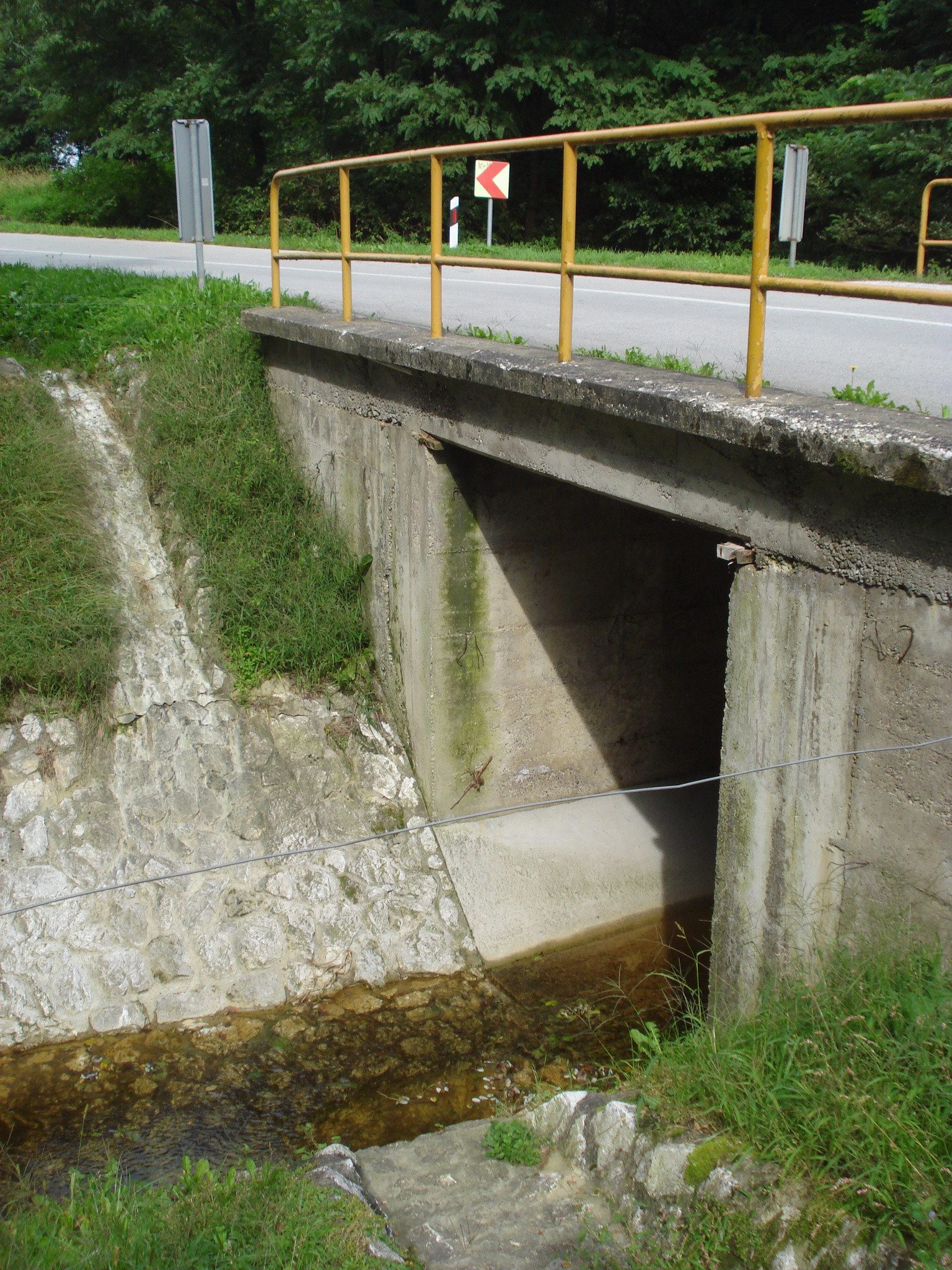
Trnava as a small brook at Gornji Mihaljevec

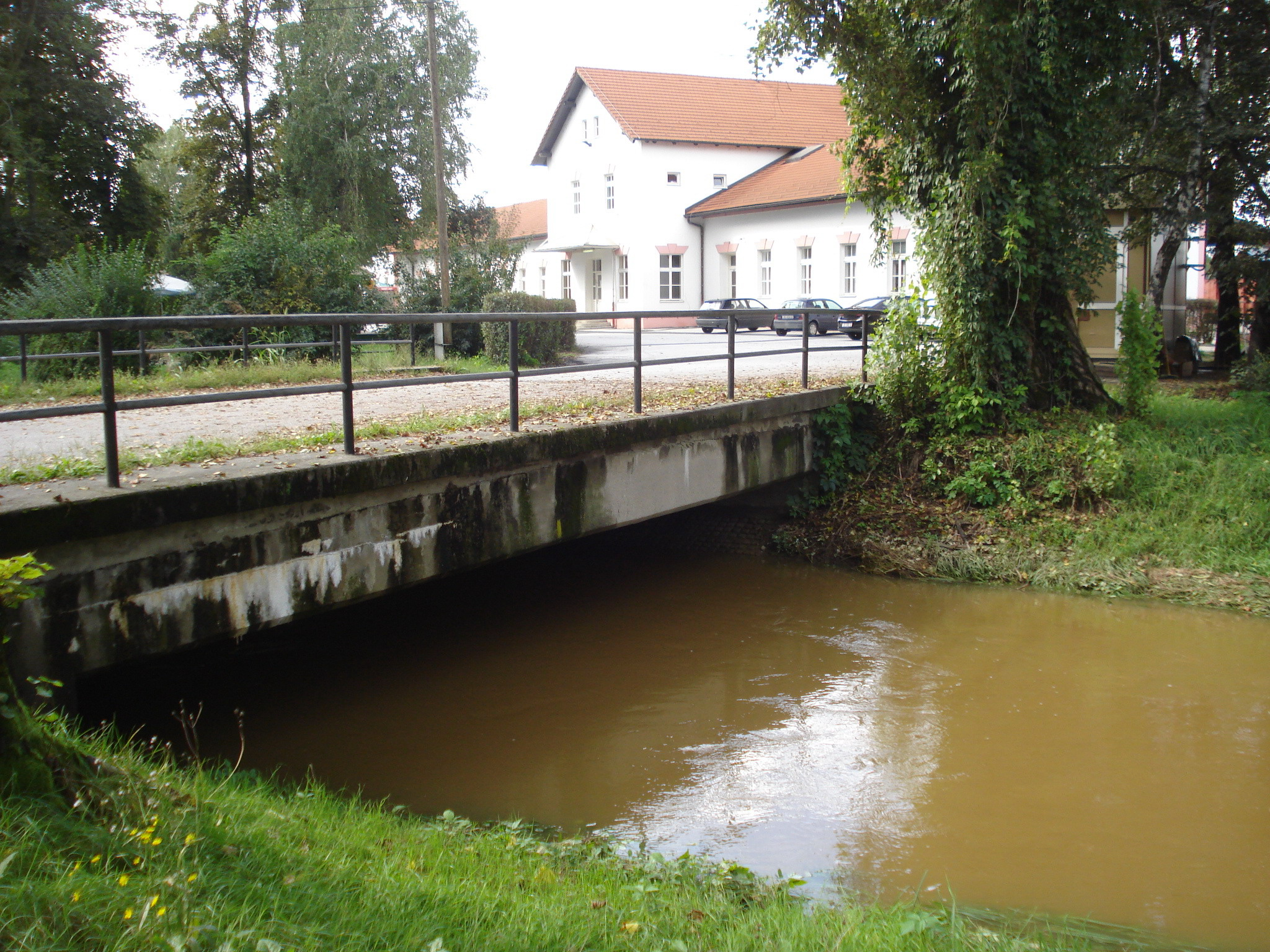
Bridge over Trnava at Čakovec train station

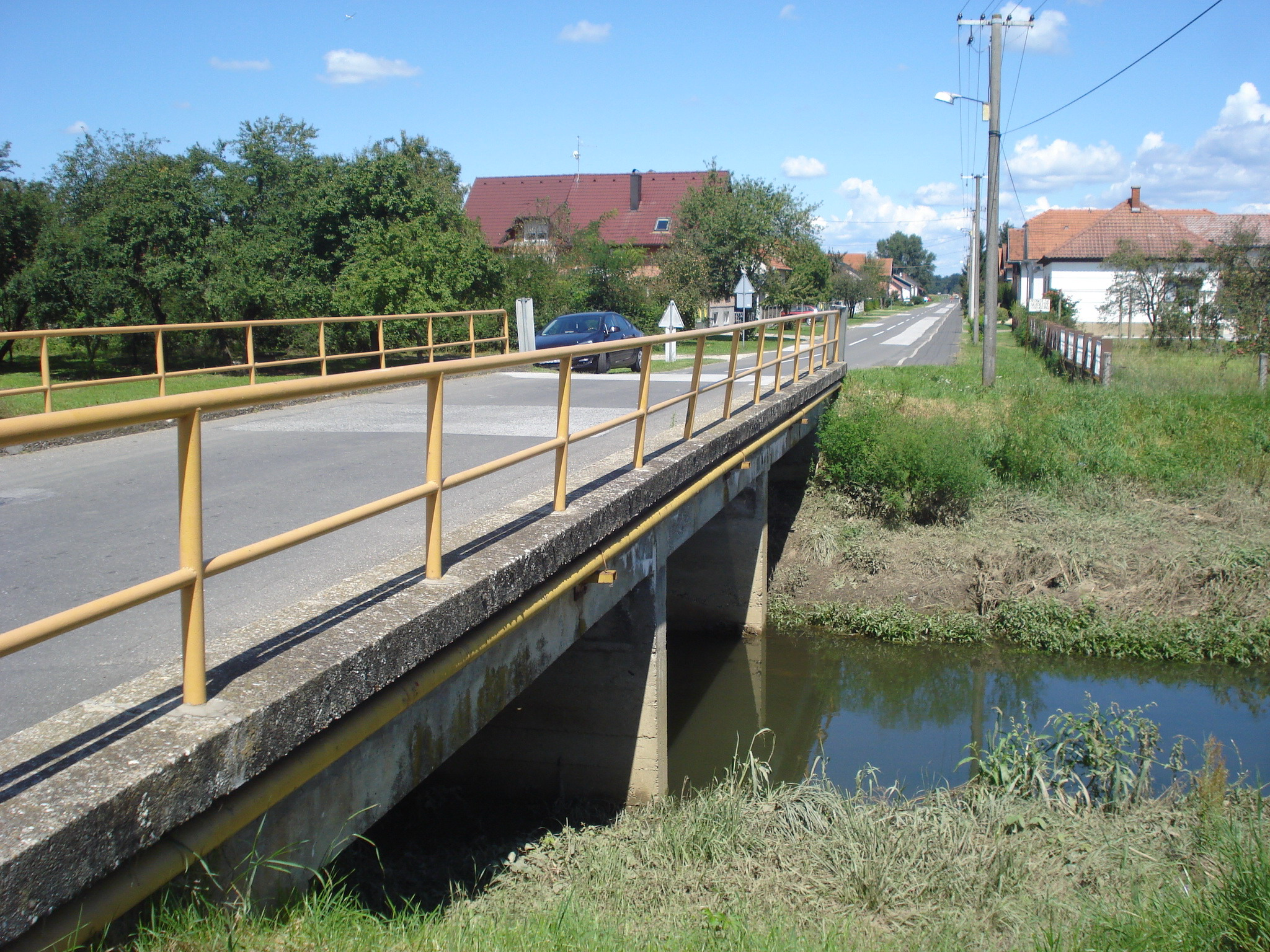
Bridge over Trnava in Mala Subotica

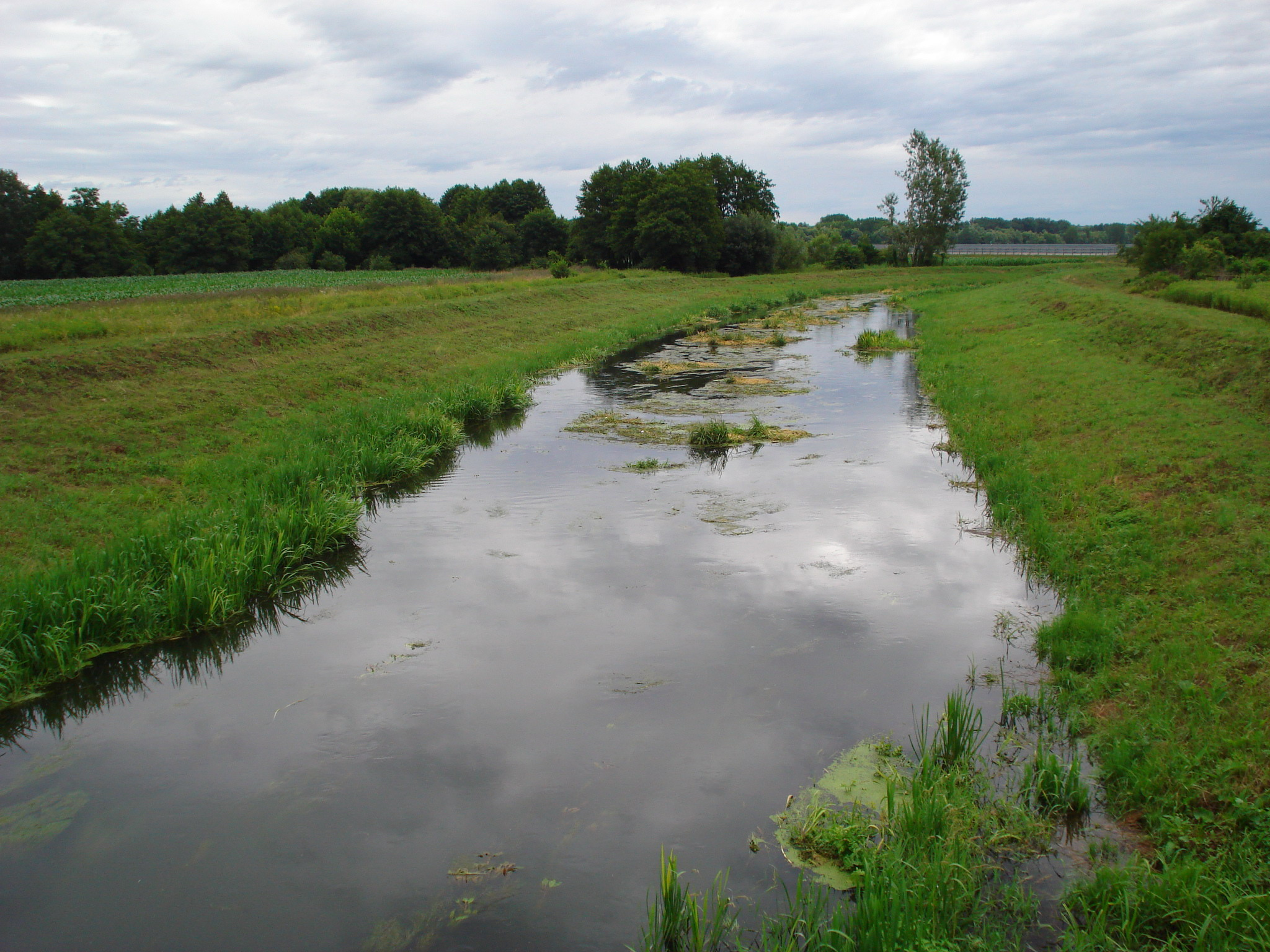
Trnava at Goričan
