= D208 road =

Road in Croatia

D208 state road

Route information
- Length: 6.9 km (4.3 mi)

Major junctions
- From: Trnovec border crossing to Slovenia; Slovenian G2 road
- To: D3 in Nedelišće

Location
- Country: Croatia
- Counties: Međimurje
- Major cities: Čakovec

Highway system
- Highways in Croatia

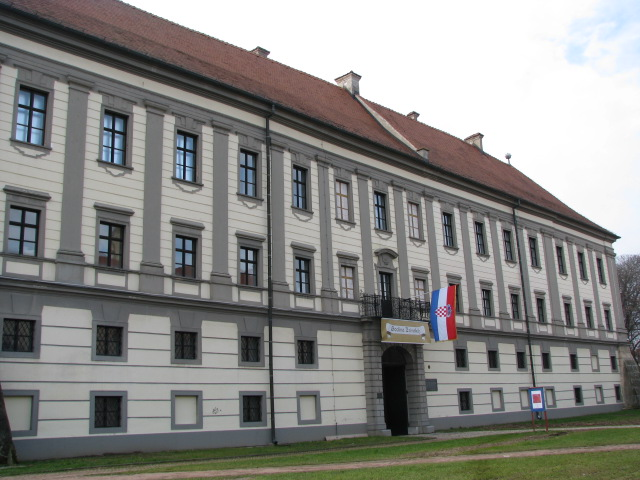
Čakovec, near the eastern terminus of the D208 road

D208 is a state road in Međimurje region of Croatia connecting Trnovec and nearby Trnovec border crossing to Slovenia to D3 state road in Nedelišće near Čakovec, and the road also serves as a connecting road to the A4 motorway as it terminates near Čakovec interchange via the D3. The road is 6.9 km (4.3 mi) long.

Like all state roads in Croatia, the D208 is managed and maintained by Hrvatske ceste, state owned company.

== Traffic volume ==
Traffic is regularly counted and reported by Hrvatske ceste, operator of the road.

D208 traffic volume
Road	Counting site	AADT	ASDT	Notes
D208	1202 Trnovec	948	1,009	Between border crossing and Ž2009 junction.

== Road junctions and populated areas ==
D208 junctions/populated areas
Type	Slip roads/Notes
	Trnovec border crossing to Slovenia. Slovenian G2 road to Ormož and Ptuj. The western terminus of the road.
	Trnovec
	Ž2009 to Macinec, Gornji Mihaljevec and D227 state road.
	Gornji Hrašćan; Ž2019 to Črečan.
	Nedelišće; D3 to Čakovec and A4 motorway Čakovec interchange (to the north) and to Varaždin (to the south). The eastern terminus of the road.
