= Prhovec =

Prhovec may refer to:

- Zgornji Prhovec, a village near Zagorje ob Savi, Slovenia
- Prhovec, Croatia, a village near Gornji Mihaljevec
