= Parag =

Parag is a Sanskrit word, meaning pollen. It may refer to:

== People ==
- Parag Agrawal, Indian-American software engineer, former CEO of Twitter
- Parag Madkaikar, Indian cricketer
- Parag More, Indian cricketer
- Parag Khanna, Indian-American specialist in geopolitics and globalization
- Parag Kumar Das (1961–1996), Indian journalist, newspaper editor and political activist
- Umesh Parag (born 1971), New Zealand field hockey player
- Riyan Parag, Indian cricketer
- Parag Lakhani, Indian Cinematographer

== Other uses ==
- Parag, Croatia, village in northern Croatia
- Parag (magazine), a children's magazine published by The Times Group in the 1980s and 1990s
