= Mur (river) =

River in Central Europe

Mur/Mura
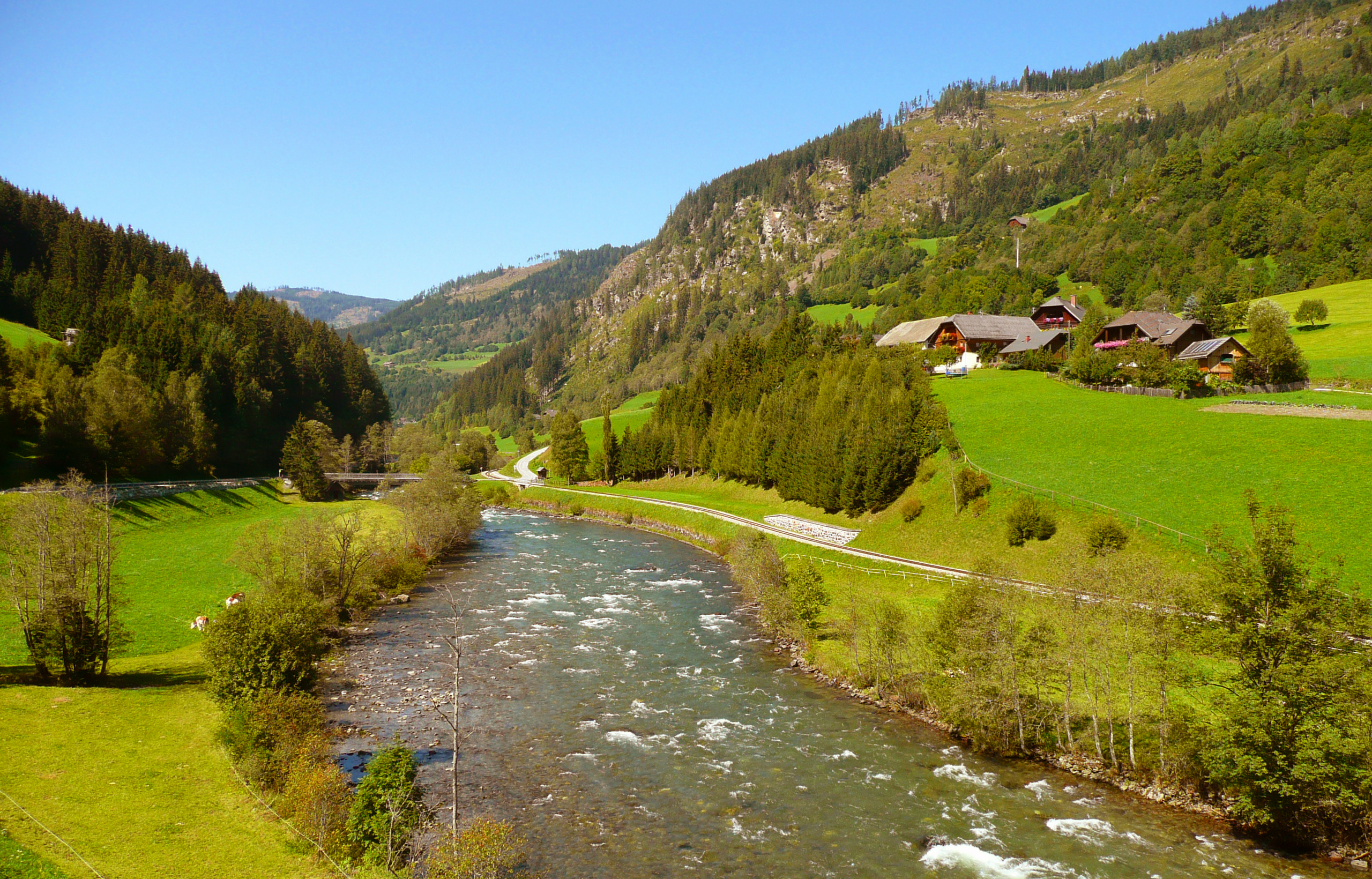
- The Mur Valley near Tamsweg in Austria

Location
- Countries: Austria; Slovenia; Croatia; Hungary

Physical characteristics
- Source
  - location: Hohe Tauern at Muhr, Austria
  - coordinates: 47°7′48″N 13°20′49″E
  - elevation: 1,898 m (6,227 ft)
- Mouth
  - location: Drava near Legrad, Croatia
  - coordinates: 46°18′19″N 16°52′39″E
  - elevation: 130 m (430 ft)
- Length: 463.7 km (288.1 mi)
- Basin size: 14,109 km^{2} (5,448 sq mi)
- Discharge
  - average: 166 m^{3}/s (5,900 cu ft/s)

Basin features
- Progression: Drava→ Danube→ Black Sea

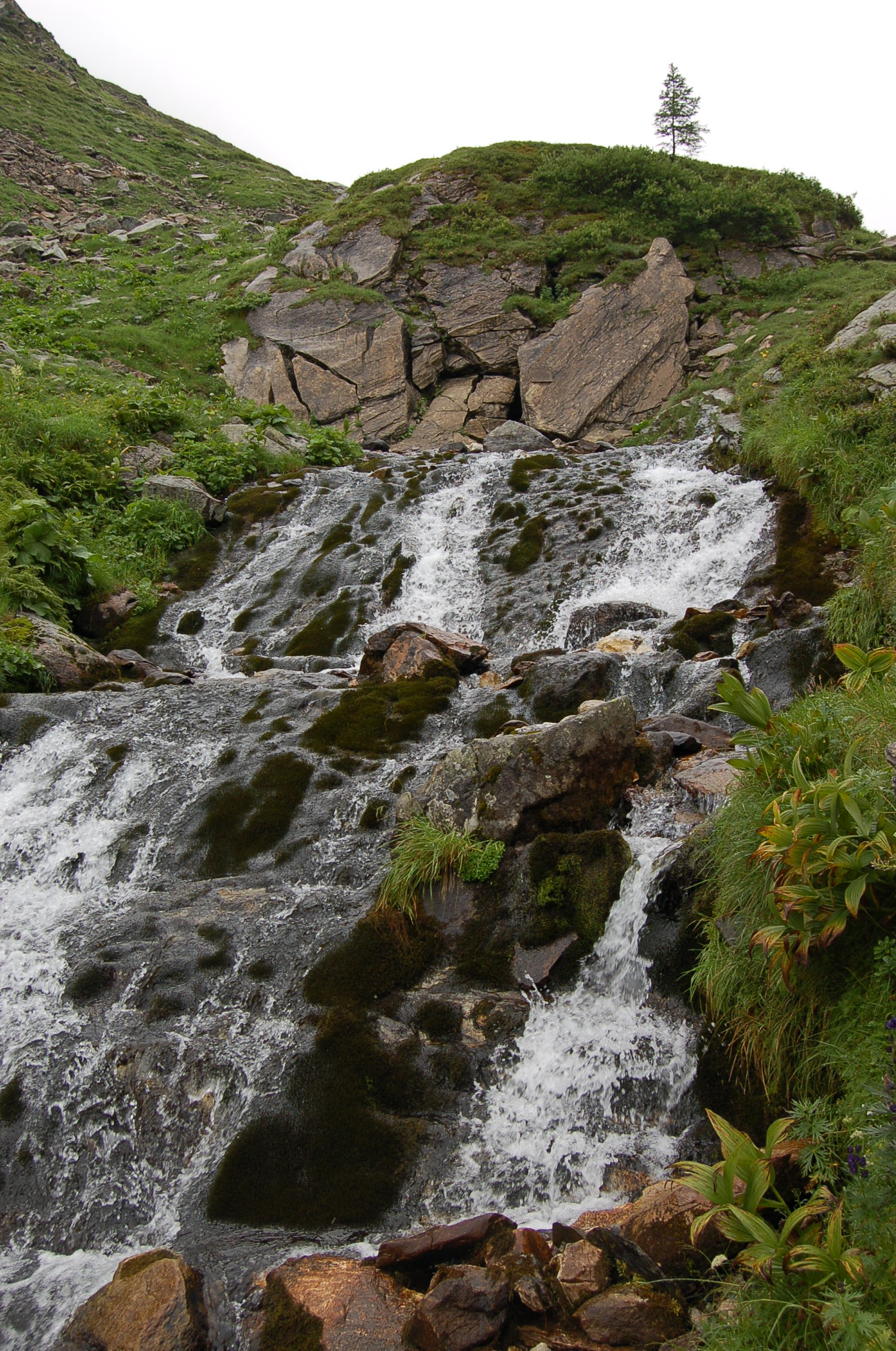
Mur source (Murursprung) in the Ankogel Group of the High Tauern

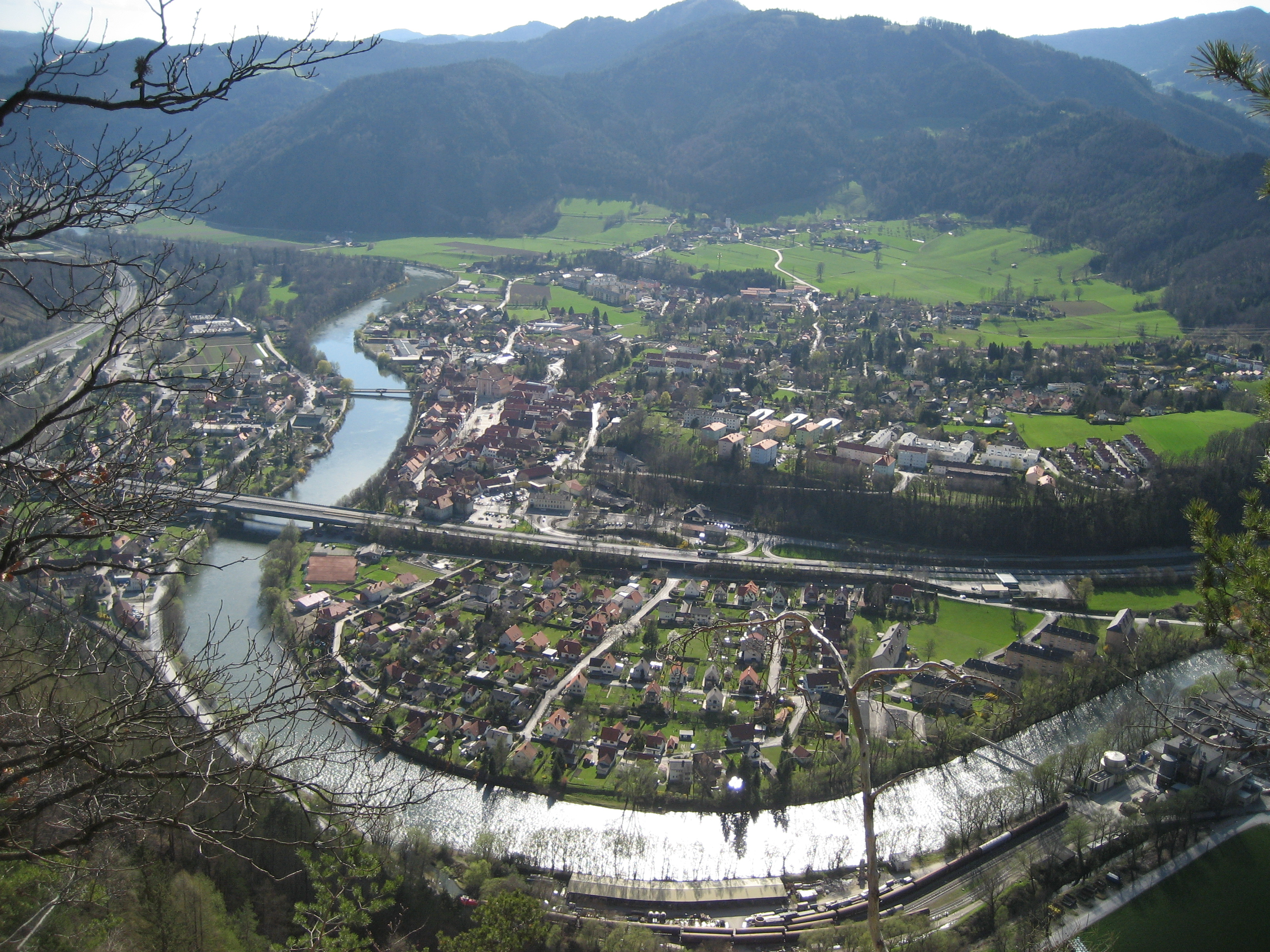
The Mur passing through Frohnleiten, from left to right in the middle the expressway S35 Brucker Schnellstraße (regarding southwest and downwards from the Gschwendtberg mountain)

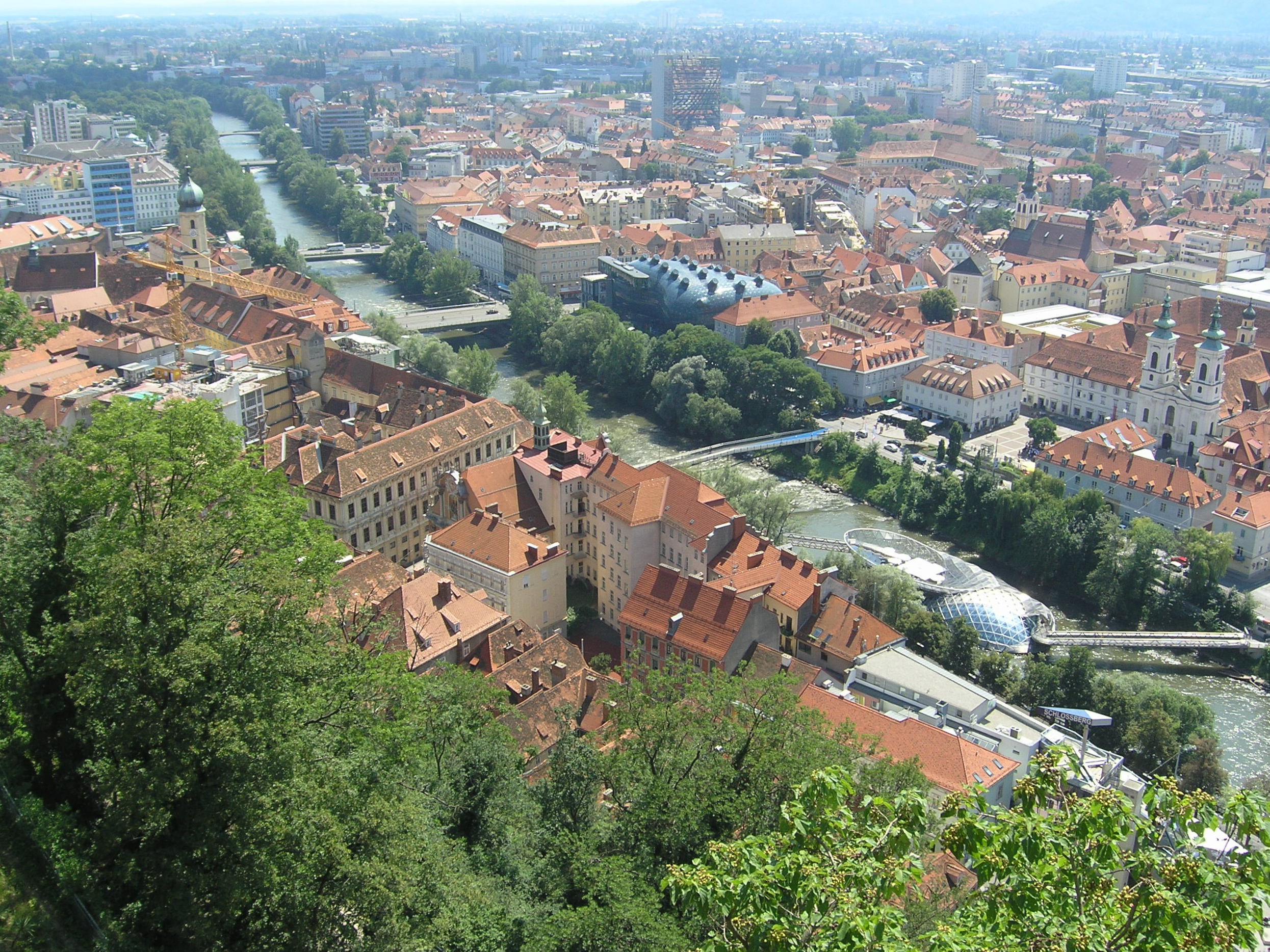
The Mur in Graz, view from Schlossberg (Southwest direction)

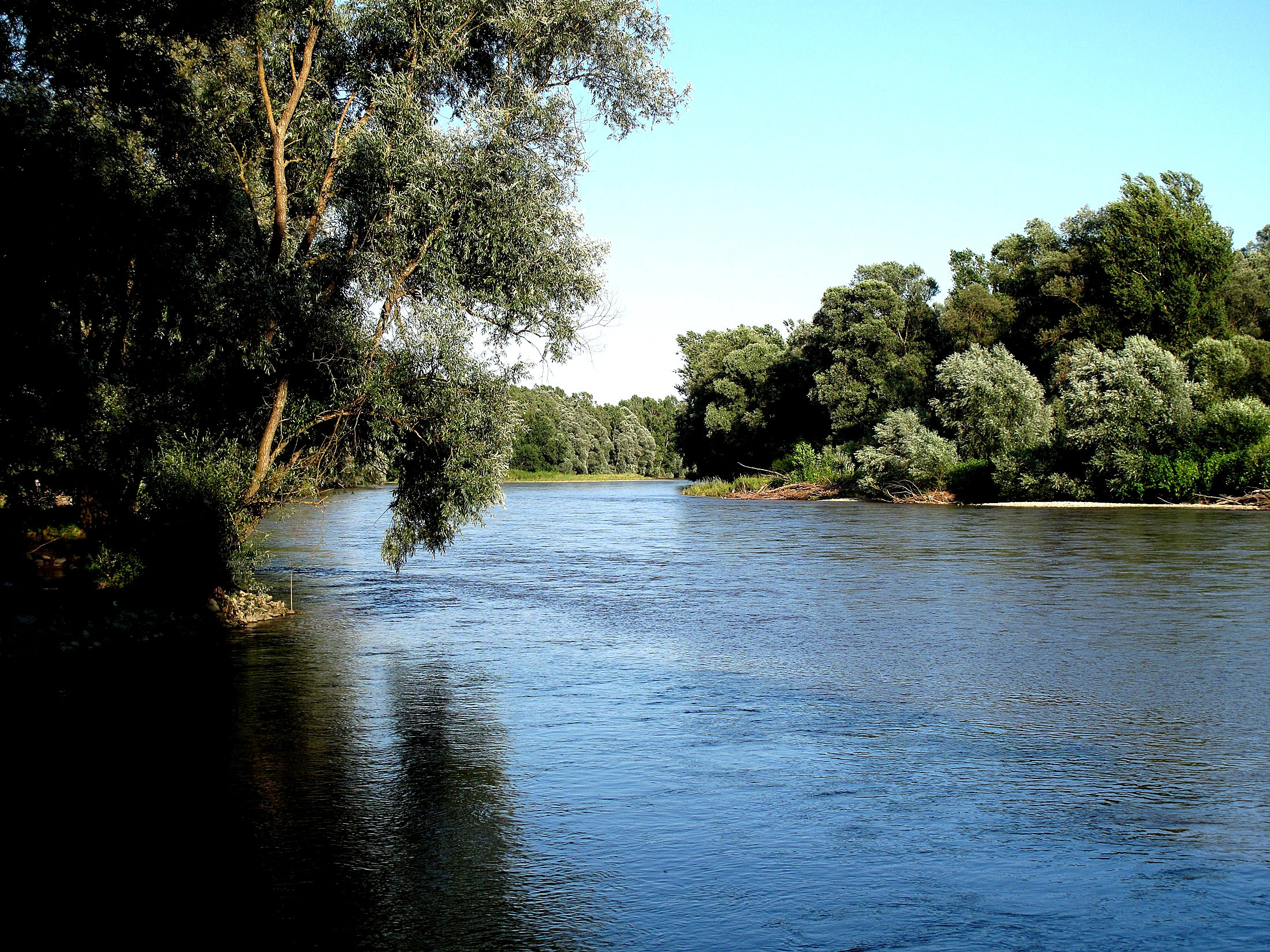
The Mur in Slovenia

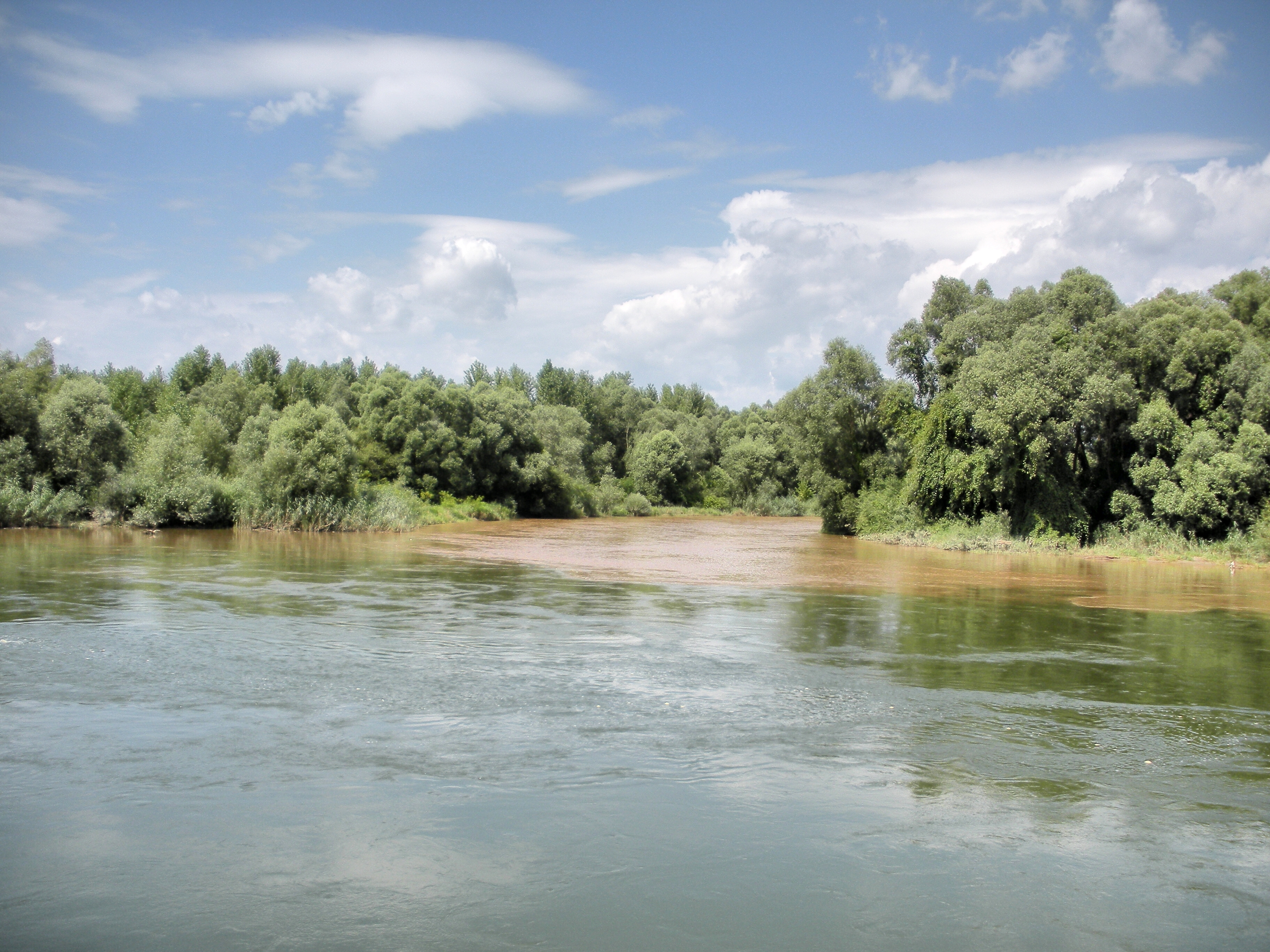
The confluence of the Drava (foreground) and Mura near Legrad, Croatia

The Mur (German pronunciation: [ˈmuːɐ̯]) or Mura (Slovene: [ˈmúːɾa]; Croatian: [mǔːra]; Hungarian: [ˈmurɒ]; Prekmurje Slovene: Müra or Möra) is a river in Central Europe rising in the Hohe Tauern national park of the Central Eastern Alps in Austria with its source at 1,898 m (6,227 ft) above sea level. It is a tributary of the Drava and subsequently the Danube.

The Mur's total length is around 464 kilometres (288 mi). About 326 km are within the interior of Austria; 95 km flow in and around Slovenia (67 km along the borders with Austria and Croatia, 28 km inside Slovenia), and the rest forms the border between Croatia and Hungary. The largest city on the river is Graz, Austria. Its drainage basin covers an area of 14,109 km^{2} (5,448 mi^{2}).

Tributaries of the Mur include the Mürz, the Sulm, the Ščavnica, the Ledava and the Trnava.

== Etymology ==
The river was attested as Maura in AD 799, Muora in 890, Mura in 1259, Mvr and Mver in 1310, and Muer in 1354. The name is probably of Slavic origin, nominalized from the adjective *murъ 'dark', meaning 'dark water'.

== River course ==
The river rises in a remote valley within the Lungau region of the Austrian state of Salzburg. The river flows eastward through Tamsweg before crossing the border into the state of Styria.

Between Tamsweg and Unzmarkt-Frauenburg the river flows through a rural mountain valley and is closely paralleled by the 65 km (40 mi) long narrow gauge Murtalbahn railway. From Unzmarkt the river continues in an easterly direction through the industrial towns of Leoben and Bruck an der Mur. At Bruck an der Mur the Mürz joins the Mur, which turns sharply south to flow through the city of Graz.

The river flows through the centre of Graz, passing beside the Schloßberg and the historic Inner City. In the run-up to Graz's year as the European Capital of Culture in 2003, an artificial island known as the Murinsel was constructed in the middle of the river. Once heavily polluted by several paper mills on its banks and by the ironworks around Leoben, the water quality has improved since the 1980s and the river is now regarded as an asset to the city.

From Graz, the river flows south, past the town of Leibnitz to its nearby confluence with the Sulm, where it adopts a more easterly course. Near Spielfeld, the river forms the border between Austria and Slovenia, until just after the twin towns of Bad Radkersburg and Gornja Radgona, where it crosses fully into Slovenia.

In Slovenia it passes the towns of Radenci, and Veržej. The river gives its name to the Slovenian region of Prekmurje (literally 'across the Mur') and the Croatian region of Međimurje (literally 'between the Mur'). Cable ferries and ship mills are still found in this area.

In the upper Međimurje area, in the western part of the region, the Mur floods and changes its course rather often, moving slowly toward the north on its left. Here, the biggest forest along the river, the Murščak, is located between Domašinec and Donji Hrašćan (derived from Croatian hrast 'oak'). After receiving its last significant tributary Trnava, the Mur joins the Drava river at Legrad on the Croatian-Hungarian border.

== Exploitation ==
Since the 4th century BC, there have been reports of floating mills powered by the streams of the river. The ancient technology was adopted later by arriving Slavs and then by Magyars. Several decades ago, in the 1920s and 1930s, many of these mills were still operating along the river. At least one of the old mills, the Babič Mill (Slovene: Babičev mlin) near Veržej, Slovenia, continues to operate to this day.

The Mur is known to carry small quantities of gold, not enough to be suitable for exploitation today, but this was a focus of activity for many people since ancient times. Organized research and exploitation of gold and other local resources was encouraged for the first time in 1772.

In Austria, several hydroelectric dams have been constructed for the production of electricity.

In 2017, a hydroelectric dam was under construction in Puntigam, in southern Graz. The plan includes a massive sewage pipe between the city centre and the new dam, necessitating the felling of thousands of trees. The project is controversial and environmental groups are resisting it. Both environmental impact and economic studies have found the project to be neither ecologically nor economically viable. Additional hydroelectric plants are planned for Slovenia.

== Monitoring ==
The hydrological parameters of the Mur are regularly monitored in Croatia at Mursko Središće.
