= Gornja Dubrava, Međimurje County =

Coordinates: 46°26′07″N 16°17′52″E

Gornja Dubrava
- Interactive map of Gornja Dubrava

Gornja Dubrava is a village near Gornji Mihaljevec, Croatia. In the 2021 census, it had 195 inhabitants.
