= Slakovec =

- Village
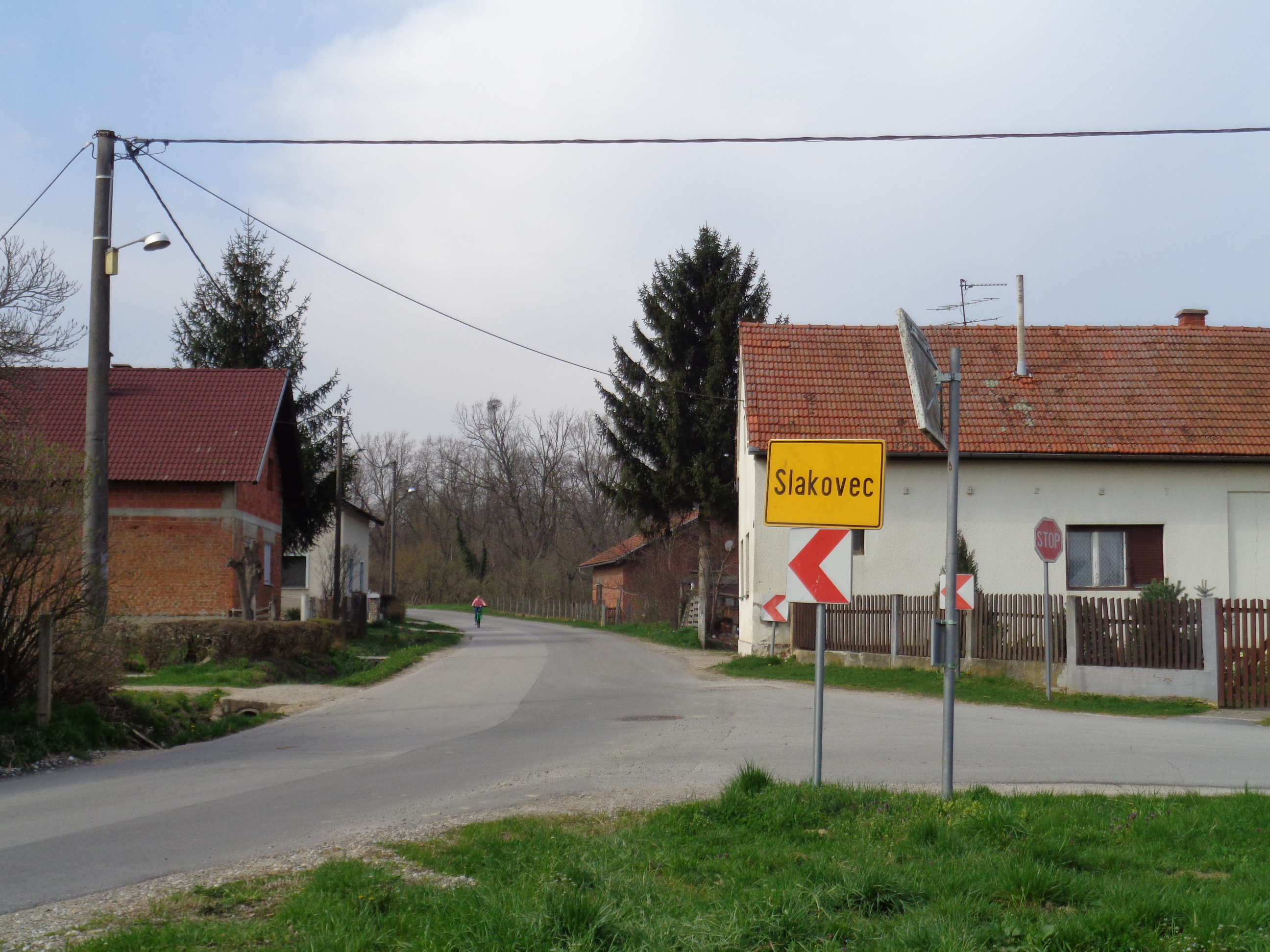
- Village entrance

- Location within Croatia
- Coordinates: 46°24′22″N 16°22′37″E
- Country: Croatia
- County: Međimurje County
- Municipality: Nedelišće

Area
  - Total: 3.1 km^{2} (1.2 sq mi)

Population (2021)
  - Total: 508
  - Density: 160/km^{2} (420/sq mi)
- Time zone: UTC+1 (CET)
  - Summer (DST): UTC+2 (CEST)
- Postal code: 40305 Nedelišće
- Area code: 040

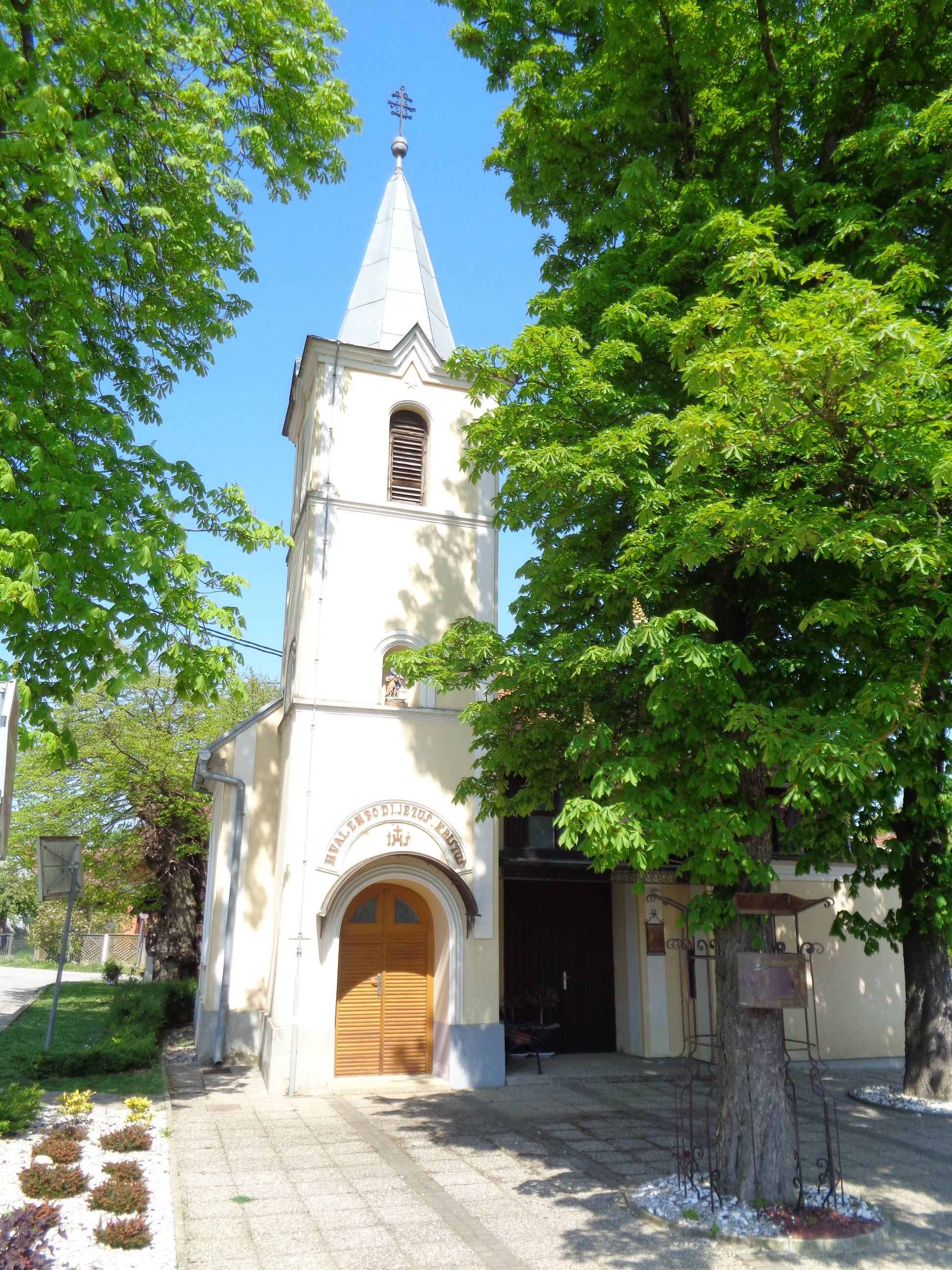
Church in Slakovec

Slakovec (Hungarian: Édeskút) is a village in Međimurje County, Croatia. It had a population of 559 in the 2011 census.

The village is part of the Nedelišće municipality. It is easily accessible via road and is located around 8 kilometres from the centre of Čakovec, the county seat and largest city of Međimurje County. The village is largely surrounded by forests. The surroundings also include some agricultural fields and farms, as well as two ponds.
