= Vukanovec =

- Interactive map of Vukanovec

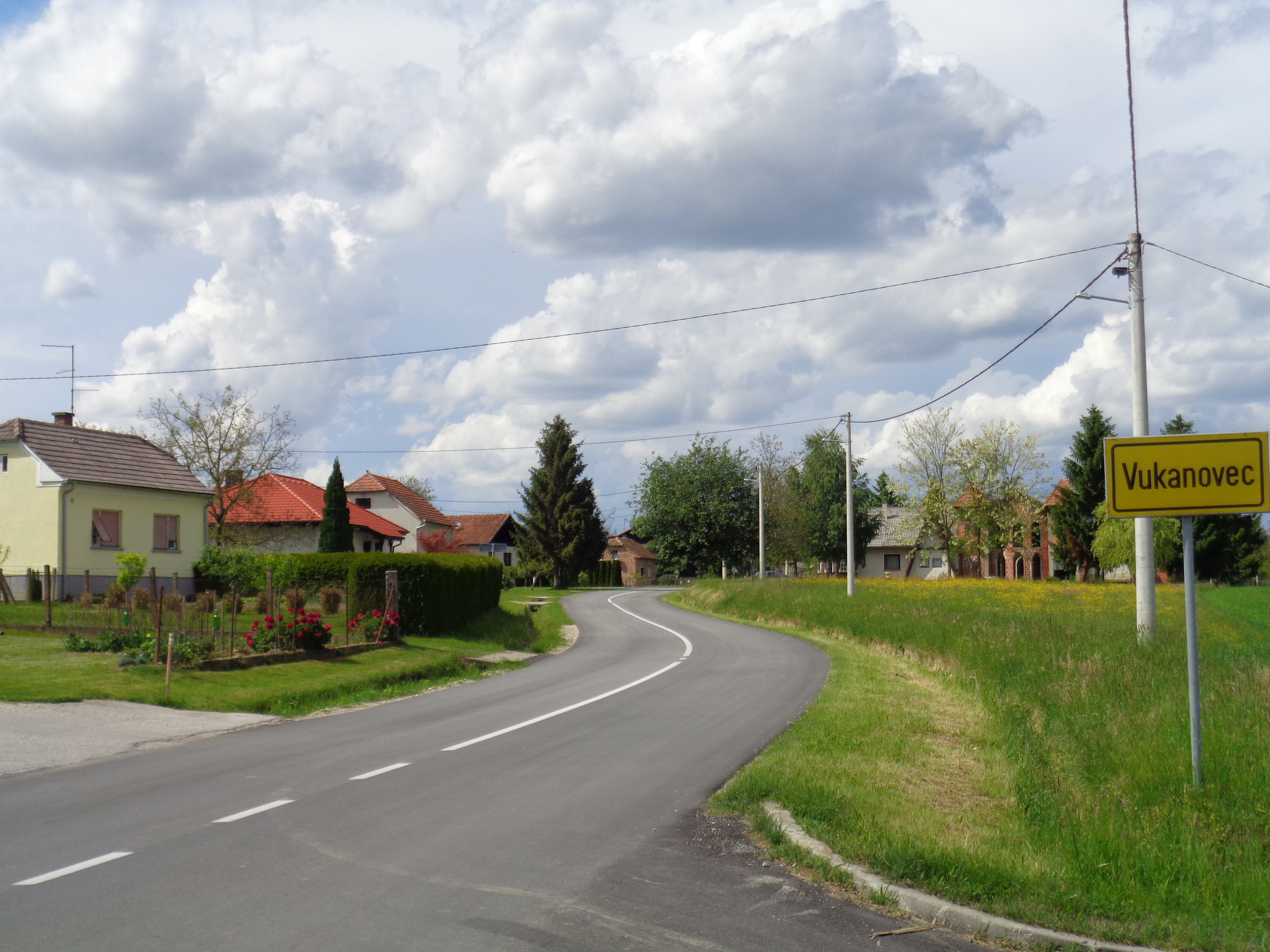
Vukanovec (Međimurje County, Croatia) - village entrance

Vukanovec is a village in the municipality of Gornji Mihaljevec, Croatia. In the 2011 census, it had 249 inhabitants.
