= Parag, Croatia =

Parag
- Village
- Location within Croatia
- Coordinates: 46°22′42″N 16°18′37″E
- Country: Croatia
- County: Međimurje County
- Municipality: Nedelišće

Area
  - Total: 0.2 km^{2} (0.077 sq mi)

Population (2021)
  - Total: 1,389
  - Density: 6,900/km^{2} (18,000/sq mi)
- Time zone: UTC+1 (CET)
  - Summer (DST): UTC+2 (CEST)
- Postal code: 4000 Čakovec

Parag is a village in northern Croatia, part of the Nedelišće municipality within Međimurje County.

== History ==
In year 2005 Parag became a separate settlement. Until then, it was part of village of Trnovec.

== Geography ==
Parag is about 12 kilometres west of Čakovec, and some 90 kilometres north of Zagreb. The village is located near the border with Slovenia.

Parag is situated in the alluvial plane of river Drava, on rivers left bank.

Parag had a population of 1,187 in 2011 census. The majority of the population are Roma people.

== Sports ==
NK Parag is a football club which plays in 3. ŽNL Međimurska.
