= Macinec =

- Village
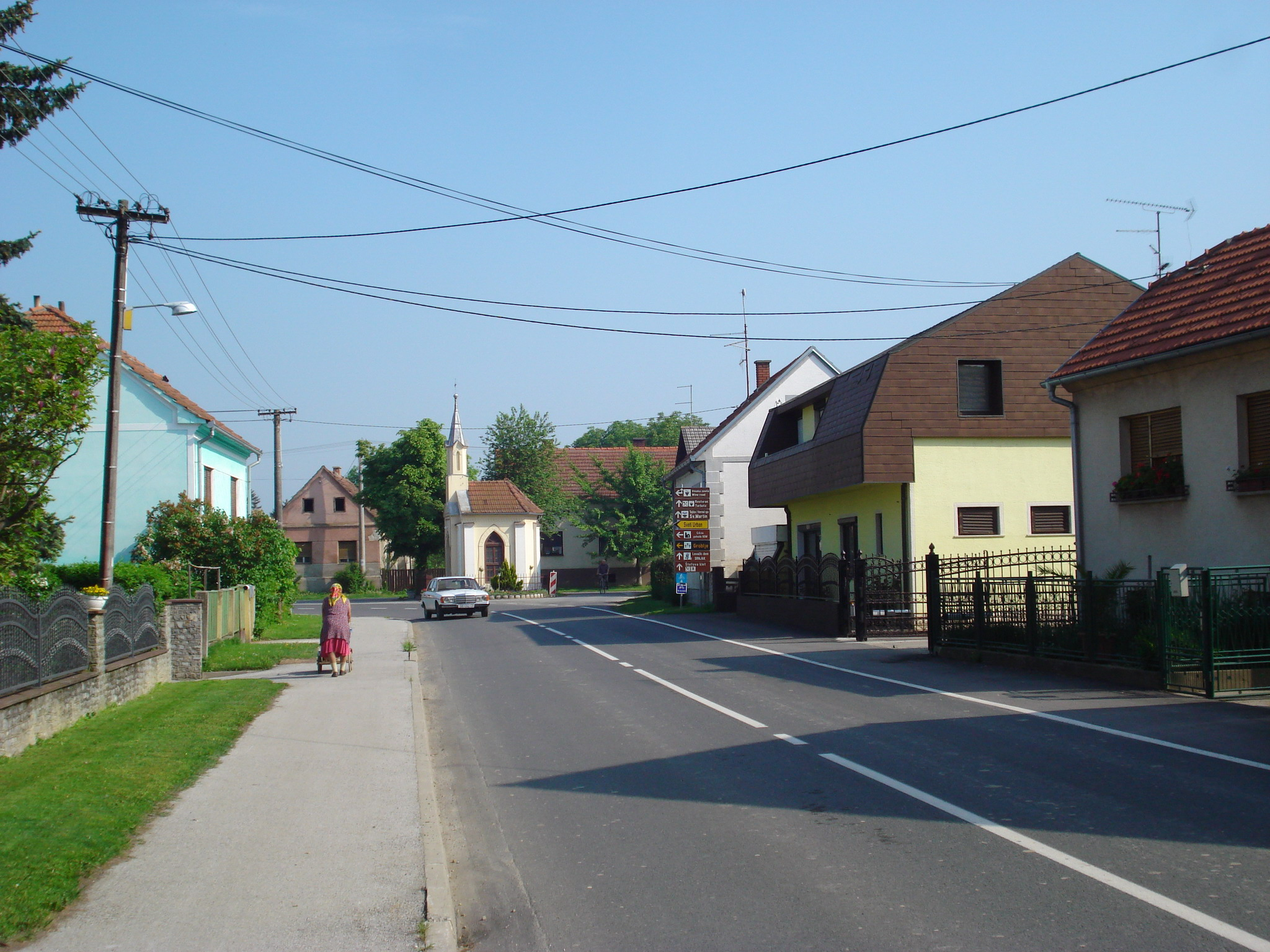
- Centre of the village

- Location within Croatia
- Coordinates: 46°23′38″N 16°19′41″E
- Country: Croatia
- County: Međimurje County
- Municipality: Nedelišće

Area
  - Total: 3.7 km^{2} (1.4 sq mi)

Population (2021)
  - Total: 484
  - Density: 130/km^{2} (340/sq mi)
- Time zone: UTC+1 (CET)
  - Summer (DST): UTC+2 (CEST)
- Postal code: 40306 Macinec
- Area code: 040

Macinec (Hungarian: Miksavár) is a village in Međimurje County, Croatia.

The village is part of the Nedelišće municipality. It is located around 12 kilometres from the centre of Čakovec, the county seat of Međimurje County, near the border checkpoint between Croatia and Slovenia in Trnovec. The population of the village in the 2011 census was 585.
