= Črečan, Međimurje County =

Črečan
- Village
- Location within Croatia
- Coordinates: 46°23′56″N 16°20′56″E
- Country: Croatia
- County: Međimurje County
- Municipality: Nedelišće

Area
  - Total: 5.4 km^{2} (2.1 sq mi)

Population (2021)
  - Total: 382
  - Density: 71/km^{2} (180/sq mi)
- Time zone: UTC+1 (CET)
  - Summer (DST): UTC+2 (CEST)
- Postal code: 4000 Čakovec

Črečan (Hungarian: Cseresnyés) is a village in northern Croatia, part of the Nedelišće municipality within Međimurje County.

== History ==
Črečan is first time mentioned in charter issued in year 1478 as Chereczan.

Catholic Chapel in Črečan was built in the year 1901.

== Geography ==
Črečan is about 10 kilometres west from the centre of Čakovec, and some 90 kilometres north of Zagreb.

Črečan is situated in the alluvial plane of river Drava, at the edge of low hills called Međimurske Gorice.

== Demographics ==
Črečan had a population of 434 in 2011 census.

Historical population

Year	Pop.	±%
1921	374	—
1931	395	+5.6%
1948	457	+15.7%
1953	466	+2.0%
1961	490	+5.2%

Year	Pop.	±%
1971	449	−8.4%
1981	402	−10.5%
1991	425	+5.7%
2001	450	+5.9%
2011	434	−3.6%
