= Palovec =

- Village
- Location within Croatia
- Coordinates: 46°23′20″N 16°32′53″E
- Country: Croatia
- County: Međimurje County
- Municipality: Mala Subotica

Area
  - Total: 8.1 km^{2} (3.1 sq mi)

Population (2021)
  - Total: 873
  - Density: 110/km^{2} (280/sq mi)
- Time zone: UTC+1 (CET)
  - Summer (DST): UTC+2 (CEST)
- Postal code: 40321 Mala Subotica

Palovec (Hungarian: Felsőpálfa) is a village in Međimurje County, Croatia.

The village is part of the municipality of Mala Subotica and had a population of 984 in the 2011 census, thus being the second largest village in the municipality.

The D3 state road passes through the village, which is located around 10 kilometres east of Čakovec, the county seat and largest city of Međimurje County. The A4 highway also passes nearby, although it can not be accessed near the village.
