= Nedelišće =

- Municipality
- Općina Nedelišće; Nedelišće Municipality
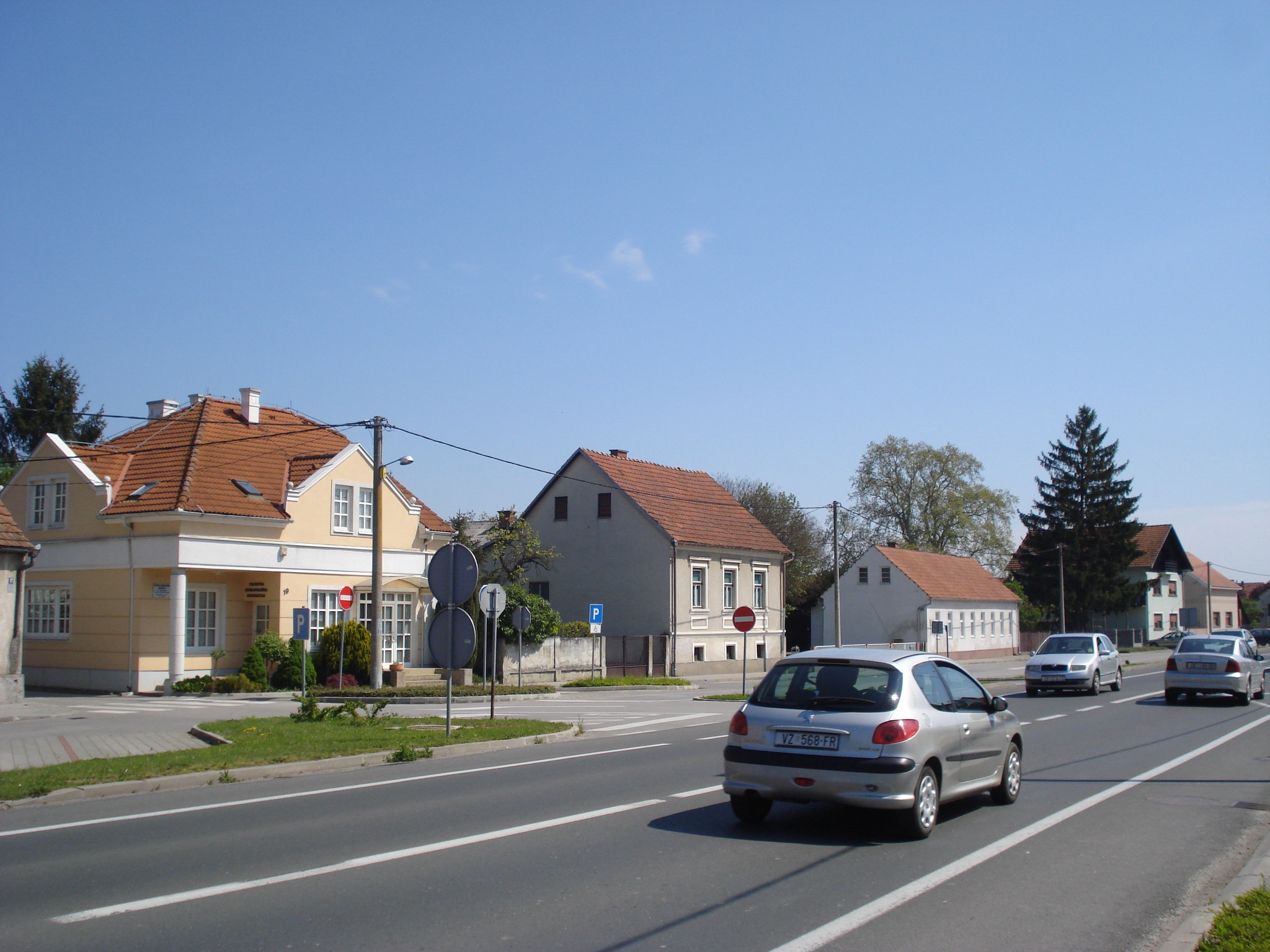
- Main street in Nedelišće

- Location of Nedelišće in Croatia
- Coordinates: 46°23′N 16°23′E
- Country: Croatia
- Region: Northern Croatia (Međimurje)
- County: Međimurje County

Government
  - Municipal mayor: Nikola Novak (SDP)

Area
  - Municipality: 58.8 km^{2} (22.7 sq mi)
  - Urban: 15.2 km^{2} (5.9 sq mi)

Population (2021)
  - Municipality: 11,017
  - Density: 187/km^{2} (485/sq mi)
  - Urban: 3,840
  - Urban density: 253/km^{2} (654/sq mi)
- Time zone: UTC+1 (CET)
  - Summer (DST): UTC+2 (CEST)
- Postal code: 40305 Nedelišće
- Website: nedelisce.hr

Nedelišće (Hungarian: Drávavásárhely; Kajkavian: Nedelišče) is a village in Međimurje County, in northern Croatia, and the seat of the Municipality of Nedelišće, which also includes 10 other villages in the south-western part of Međimurje County. Nedelišće itself is a suburban village located just outside the county seat, Čakovec, around 3 kilometres from the city's centre.

== History ==
Nedelišće was first mentioned in 1226, in a donation of the Hungarian King Béla IV. The settlement was named after Sunday (Croatian: nedjelja, local Kajkavian dialect: nedelja or nedela), the day when the Holy Trinity is venerated.

Between 1570 and 1586, Nedelišće was the seat of one of the first Croatian printing offices. The first document about the establishment of a local school originates from 1660, when Međimurje was reigned by the Zrinski family. The local volunteer fire department was founded in 1908 and is the oldest in the municipality.

== Geography ==
The main road going through the municipality is the D3 state road, connecting it with Čakovec to the east and Varaždin. The D208 road branches off of D3 road in Nedelišće and connects it with Trnovec border crossing with Slovenia towards Ormož. There are also two railroads going through the municipality, one connecting Čakovec with the Slovenian town of Ormož to the west and the other one connecting the city with other Croatian cities such as Varaždin and Zagreb to the south.

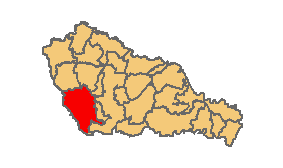
Location of Nedelišće Municipality in Međimurje County

== Demographics ==
In the 2021 census, the municipality had a population of 11,017 in the following settlements:

- Črečan, population 382
- Dunjkovec, population 860
- Gornji Hrašćan, population 773
- Gornji Kuršanec, population 797
- Macinec, population 484
- Nedelišće, population 3,840
- Parag, population 1,389
- Pretetinec, population 549
- Pušćine, population 1,089
- Slakovec, population 508
- Trnovec, population 346
Nedelišće: Population trends 1857–2021
v

population	2796	3215	3777	4169	4950	5368	5472	6279	7393	7821	8556	9423	10289	11248	11544	11975	11017
	1857	1869	1880	1890	1900	1910	1921	1931	1948	1953	1961	1971	1981	1991	2001	2011	2021

Sources: Croatian Bureau of Statistics publications

== Administration ==
The current mayor of Nedelišće is Nikola Novak and the Nedelišće Municipal Council consists of 15 seats.

Groups	Councilors per group
SDP	12 / 15
NPS-HSU	2 / 15
HDZ-HDS	1 / 15

== Culture and sport ==
Nedelišće is known as the host of some manifestations, most notably the largest annual business fair in Međimurje County, MESAP (Croatian: Međimurski sajam poduzetništva), which usually takes place in June and gathers various companies from all over the county.

The local sports and gymnastics centre, Sport Hub Nedelišće, is one of the largest sport centres in Croatia and it includes a gymnastics hall, sports hall, ballet hall, meeting room and a hostel. The local sports teams include the football club NK Nedelišće, who play in the Croatian Third League, and the volleyball clubs OKM Centrometal and OK Nedelišće Elting, who play in the First and Second Croatian Volleyball League.

== Gallery ==
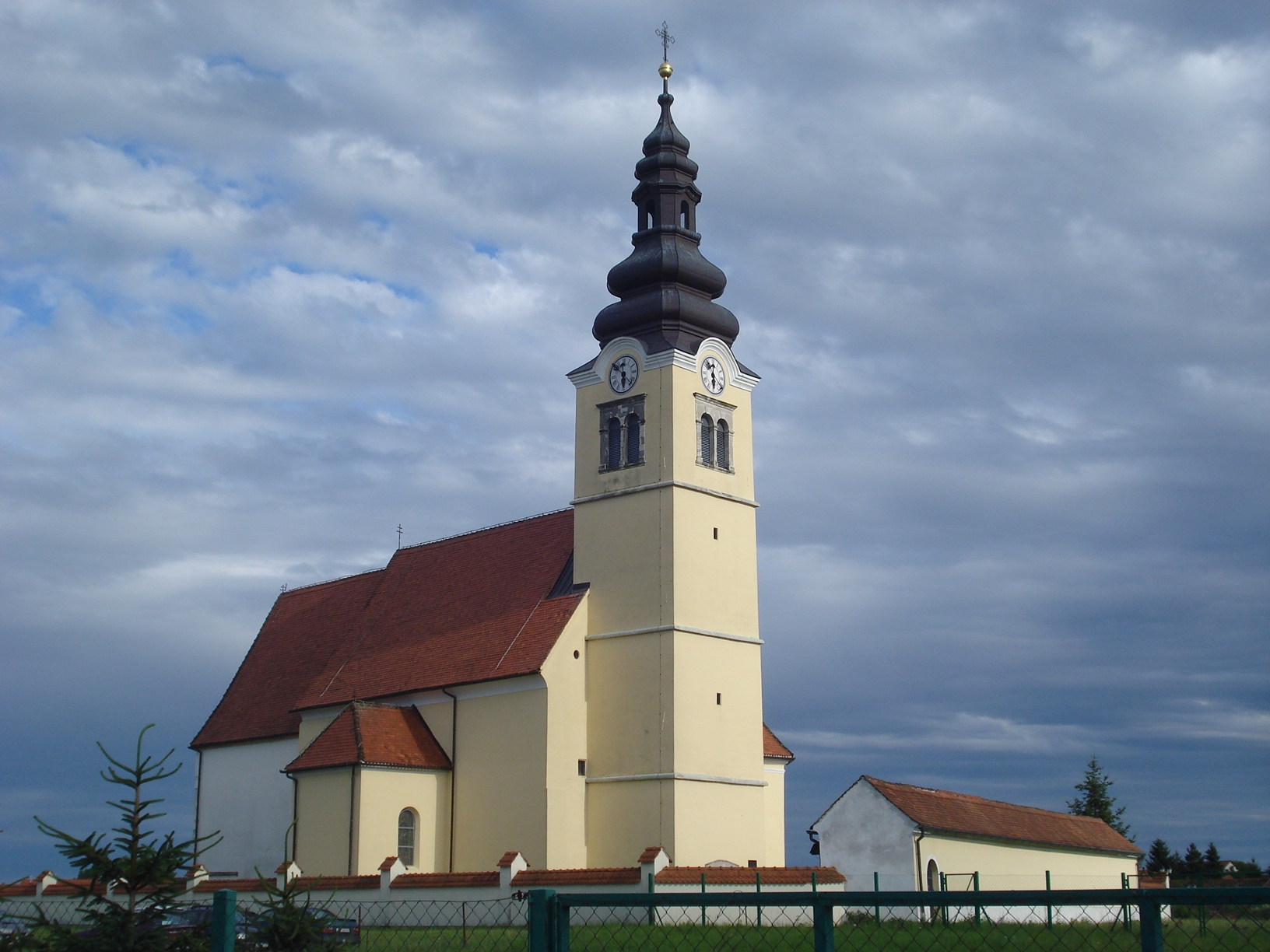
Holy Trinity Church

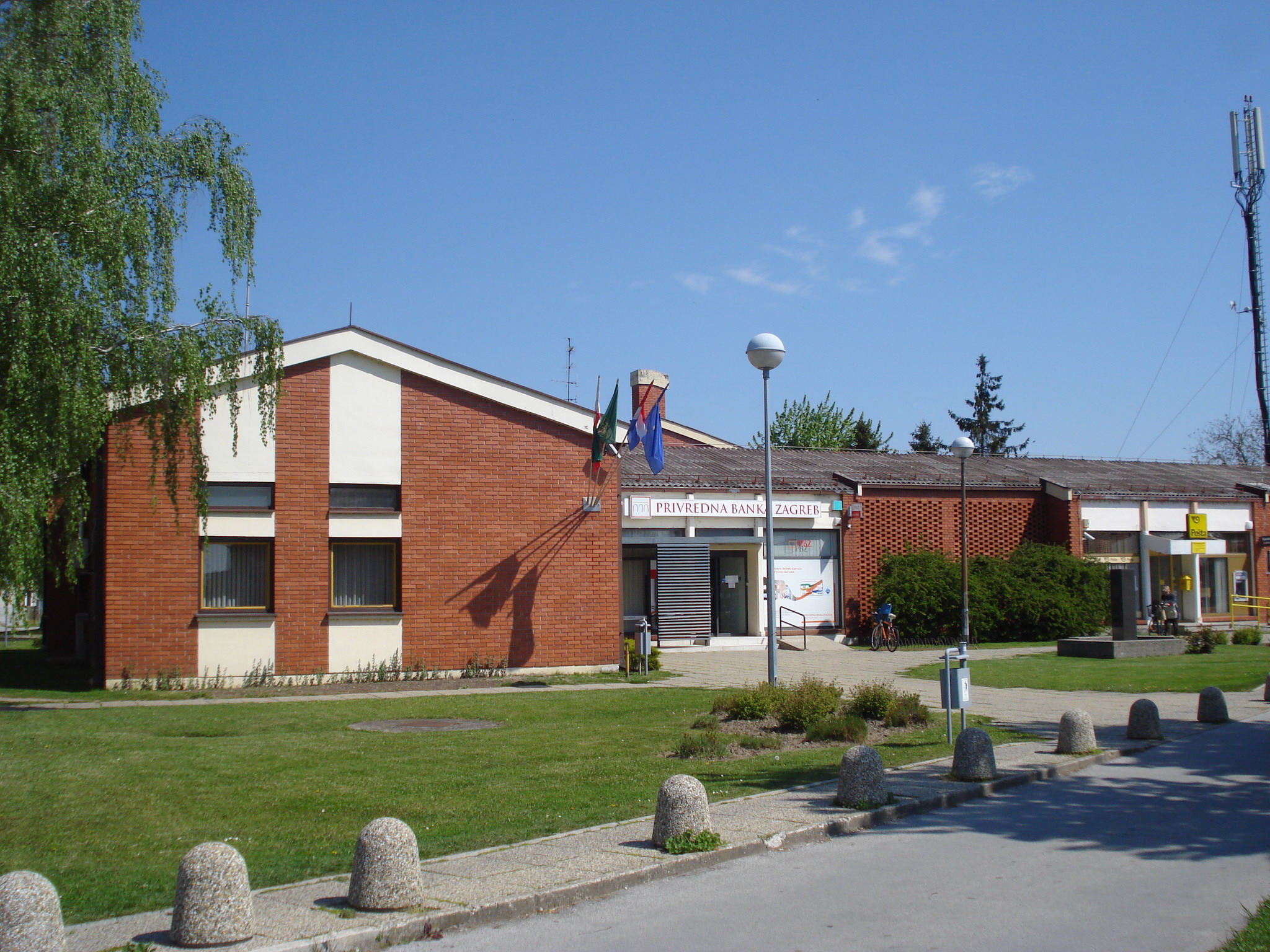
Village centre

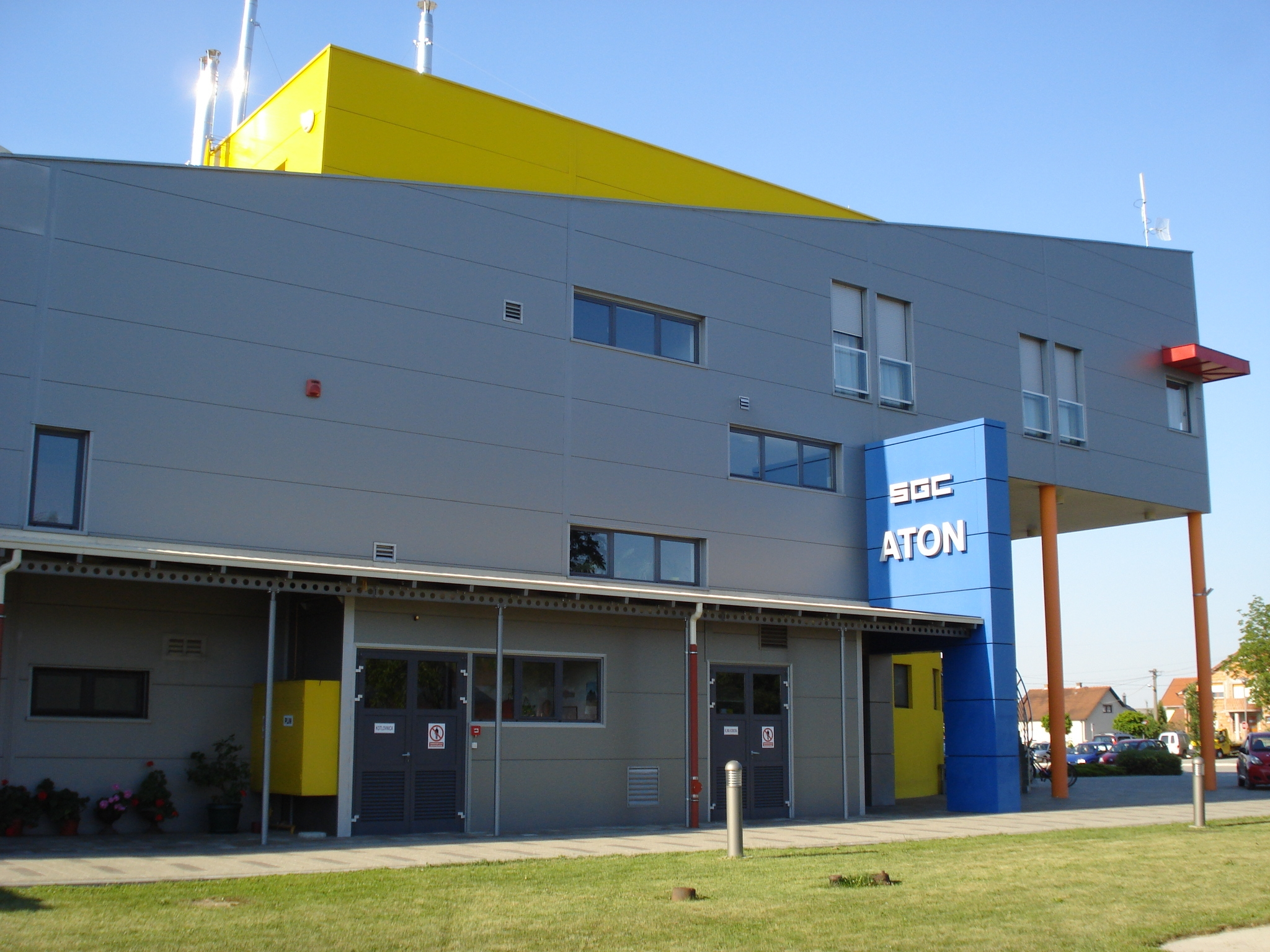
Aton Gymnastics Training Centre

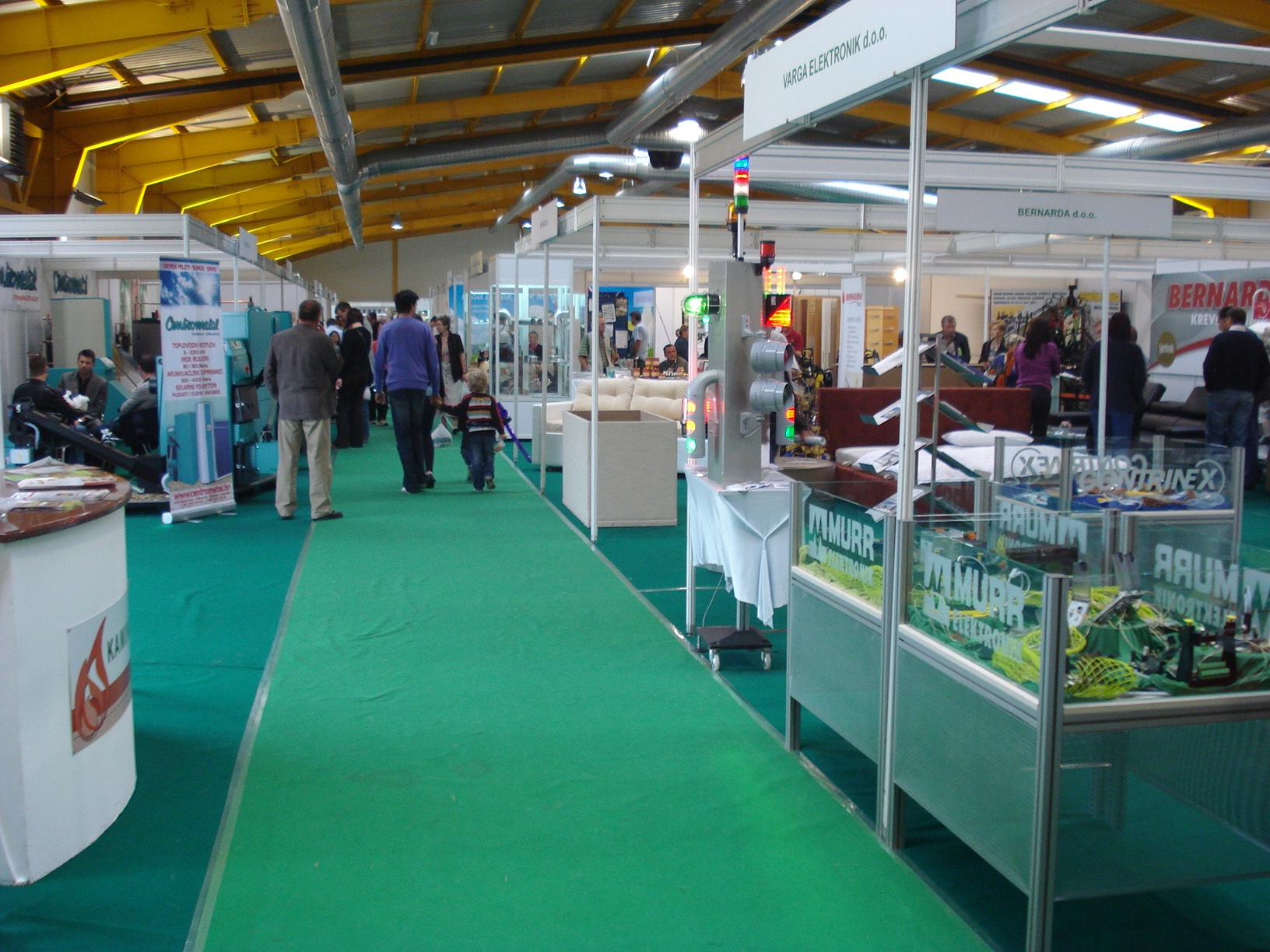
Exhibition hall at the annual MESAP 2011 trade fair

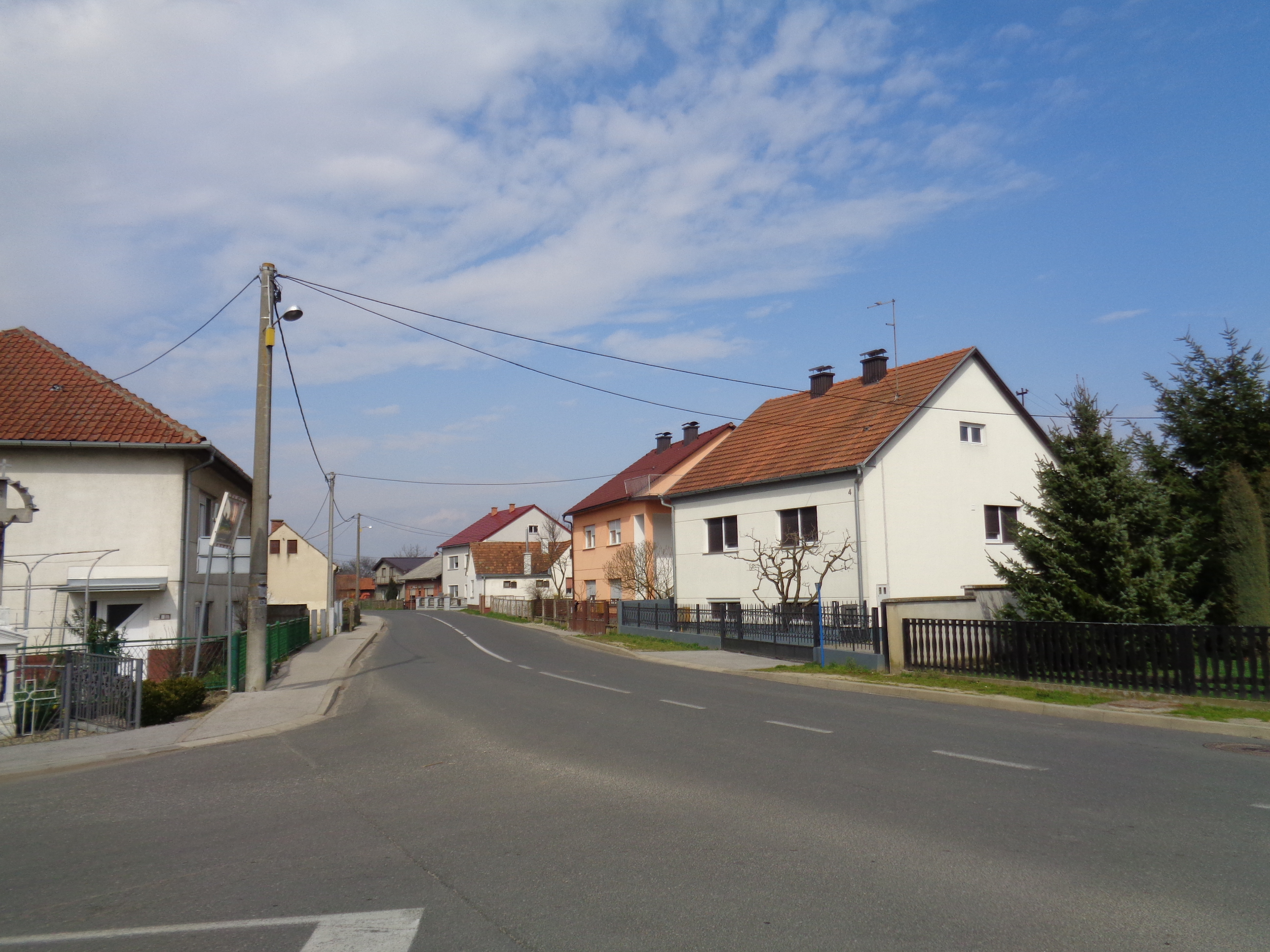
Dunjkovec

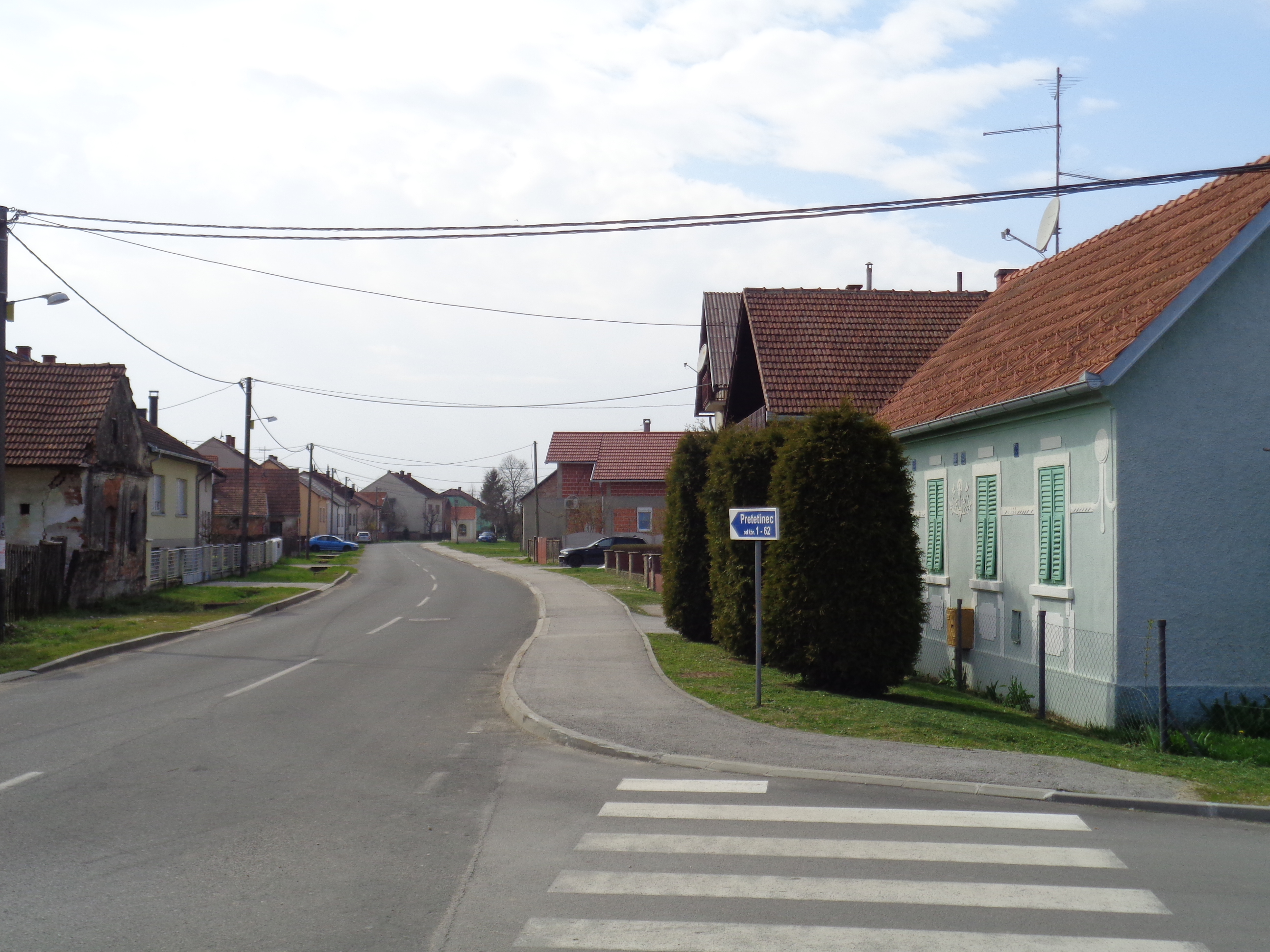
Pretetinec
