= Gornji Hrašćan =

- Village
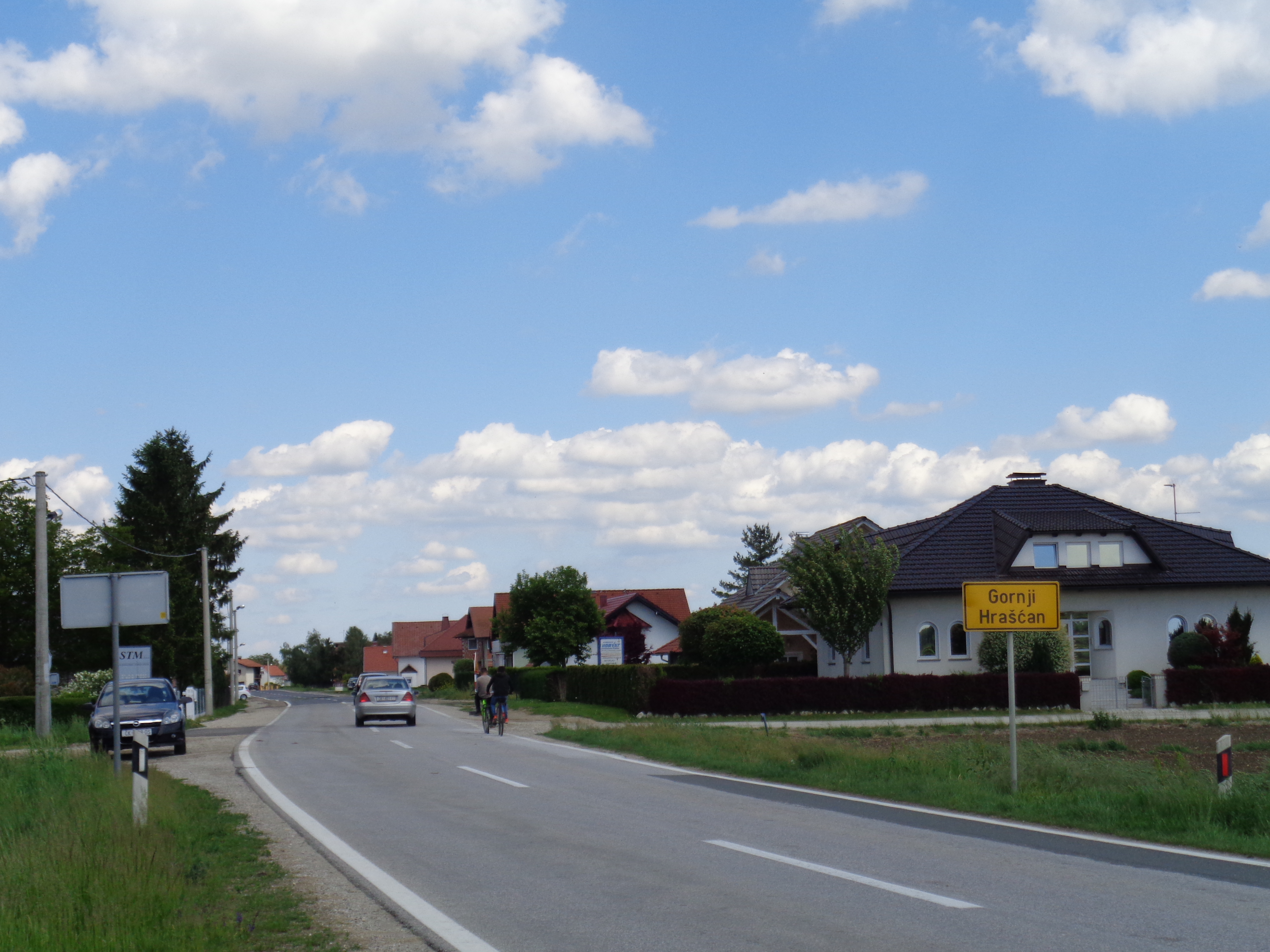
- Village entrance

- Location within Croatia
- Coordinates: 46°22′41″N 16°20′56″E
- Country: Croatia
- County: Međimurje County
- Municipality: Nedelišće

Area
  - Total: 9.1 km^{2} (3.5 sq mi)

Population (2021)
  - Total: 773
  - Density: 85/km^{2} (220/sq mi)
- Time zone: UTC+1 (CET)
  - Summer (DST): UTC+2 (CEST)
- Postal code: 40306 Macinec

Gornji Hrašćan (Hungarian: Drávacsány) is a village in Međimurje County in northern Croatia. It is located six kilometres west from the county seat Čakovec, approximately halfway between the city and the Croatian-Slovenian border-crossing point in Trnovec. The village is part of the municipality of Nedelišće and its population in the 2011 census was 910.

The name Hrašćan is derived from hrast, the Croatian word for oak, while gornji means upper and is included in the name to distinguish the village from Donji Hrašćan, a smaller village also located in Međimurje.

Dražen Ladić, former goalkeeper of the Croatia national football team and winner of the bronze medal at the 1998 FIFA World Cup in France, grew up in the village.

In 2008, a memorial-cross was erected to honour those killed by the Yugoslav Partisans in 1945. In 2009, the remains of some of the victims were discovered by chance during a commercial excavation in the area. The remains of between 30 and 40 people were exhumed and have been temporarily reburied in Čakovec.
