= Mala Subotica =

- Municipality
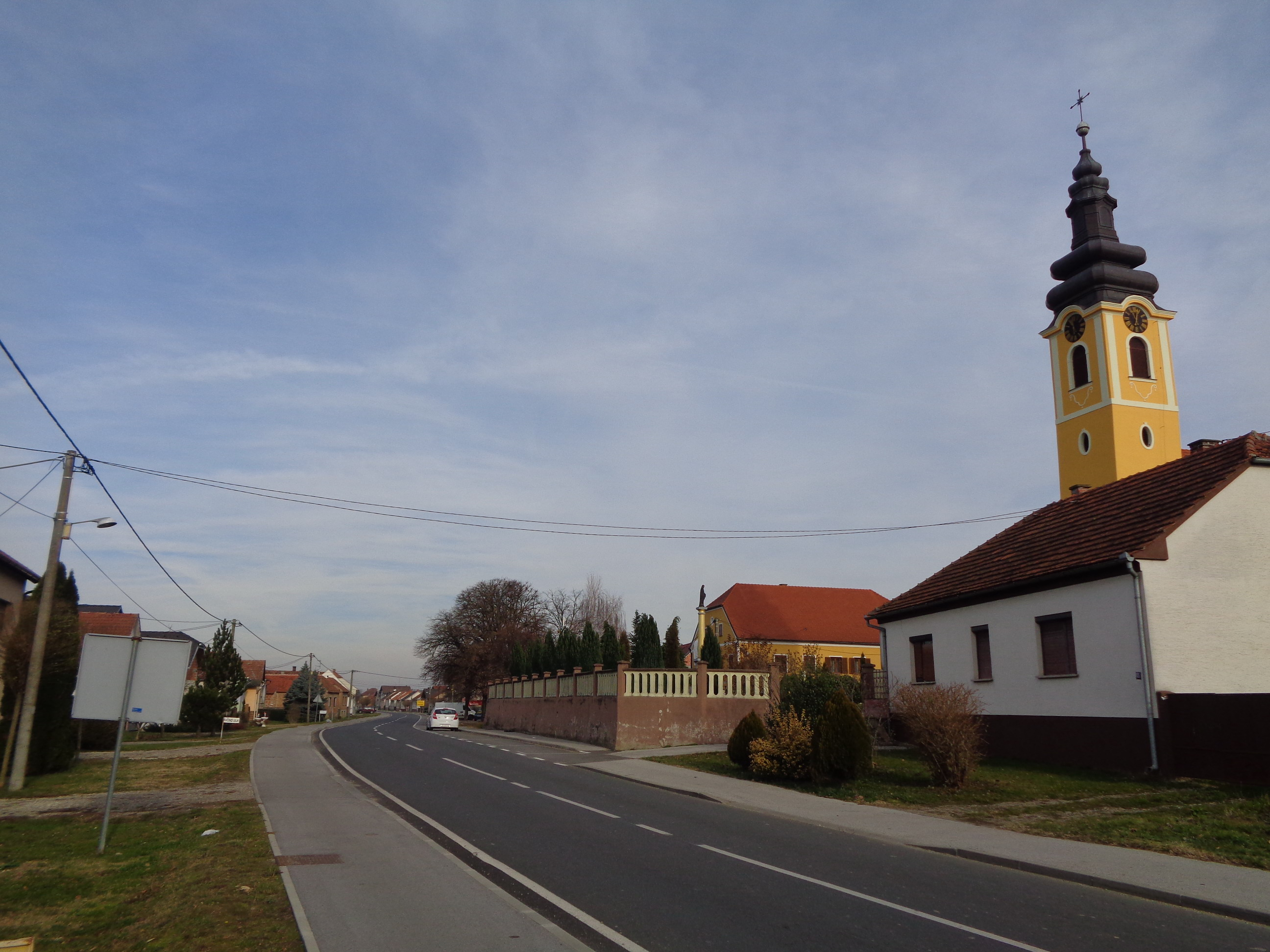
- Street in the village

- Coat of arms

- Location within Croatia
- Coordinates: 46°23′N 16°32′E
- Country: Croatia
- Region: Northern Croatia (Međimurje)
- County: Međimurje County

Government
  - Municipal mayor: Valentino Škvorc (Independent)

Area
  - Municipality: 36.7 km^{2} (14.2 sq mi)
  - Urban: 12.8 km^{2} (4.9 sq mi)

Population (2021)
  - Municipality: 4,344
  - Density: 118/km^{2} (307/sq mi)
  - Urban: 1,766
  - Urban density: 138/km^{2} (357/sq mi)
- Time zone: UTC+1 (CET)
  - Summer (DST): UTC+2 (CEST)
- Postal code: 40321 Mala Subotica
- Area code: 040
- Website: opcina-mala-subotica.hr

Mala Subotica (Hungarian: Kisszabadka; Kajkavian: Murska Sobotica) is a village and municipality in Međimurje County, Croatia. The village is located around 7 kilometres south-east of Čakovec, the county seat and largest city of Međimurje County.

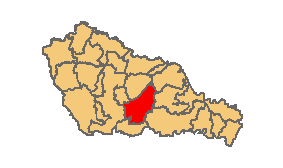
Location within Međimurje County

== History ==
The Međimurje area was inhabited in ancient times, as seen by archaeological finds dating back to 5000 BC. A stone lid of an ancient urn was found near the village of Sveti Križ and an old cemetery was found under and around the parish church, where burials took place until the end of the 18th century.

In the municipality of Mala Subotica, the first settlement mentioned was Sveti Križ, which probably got its name from the fact that the Crusaders gathered there for their campaigns to the Holy Land. On December 6, 1256, the name of the Subotica estate was first mentioned as Zumbathel.

At the end of the 19th century, Magyarization was carried out in Međimurje, which led to the name Sobotica being changed to the Hungarian name Kiszabatka, to distinguish it from Subotica in Bačka. After the Kingdom of Serbs, Croats, and Slovenes occupied Međimurje and officially annexed it on 9 January 1919, the name was changed back to Mala Subotica. After the invasion of Yugoslavia, Hungary again occupied Međimurje, until it was liberated by the Partisans in April 1945.

== Demographics ==
In the 2021 census, the municipality had a population of 4,344 in the following settlements:

- Držimurec, population 366
- Mala Subotica, population 1,766
- Palovec, population 873
- Piškorovec, population 782
- Strelec, population 257
- Sveti Križ, population 300
Mala Subotica: Population trends 1857–2021
v

population	2487	2839	2930	3109	3557	4066	4506	4928	5783	5792	5426	5606	5623	5689	5676	5452	4344
	1857	1869	1880	1890	1900	1910	1921	1931	1948	1953	1961	1971	1981	1991	2001	2011	2021

Sources: Croatian Bureau of Statistics publications

== Administration ==
The current mayor of Mala Subotica is Valentino Škvorc and the Mala Subotica Municipal Council consists of 13 seats.

Groups	Councilors per group
Independents	6 / 13
HDZ	3 / 13
NPS-HNS-SU	2 / 13
SDP	2 / 13

== Culture ==
There are currently 35 associations operating in the Municipality of Mala Subotica:

=== Sports ===
- FC “Spartak” Mala Subotica
- Football School of the Municipality of Mala Subotica
- FC “Dinamo” Palovec
- FC “Omladinec” Držimurec-Strelec
- Chess Club “Dinamo” Palovec
- Table Tennis Club Mala Subotica
- Karate Club Mala Subotica
- Sports Recreation Association “Sport for All”
- School Sports Association “Ftiči”
- Sport Fishing Club “Šaran” Mala Subotica
- Sport Fishing Club “Linjak” Palovec
- Sport Fishing Club “Klen” Držimurec-Strelec
- Community of Sports Associations of the Municipality of Mala Subotica

=== Culture ===
- Brass Orchestra of the Municipality of Mala Subotica
- Cultural and Artistic Association “Zvon” of the Parish Community of Mala Subotica
- Women's Association “Palovčanke” Palovec
- Creative Association Svetokriščani

=== Firefighting ===
- VFD Mala Subotica
- VFD Palovec
- VFD Držimurec-Strelec
- VFD Sveti Križ

=== Other Associations ===
- Association of Volunteers and Veterans of the Homeland War, Branch of Međimurje County, Mala Subotica Branch (UDVDR)
- Međimurje County Pensioners' Association, Mala Subotica Pensioners' Association
- Međimurje County Pensioners' Association, Palovec Pensioners' Association
- Hunting Society "Prepelica" Mala Subotica
- Motorcycle Club "Orlovi" Mala Subotica
- Ecological Society Sveti Križ
- Ecological Association "Vrba" Jurčevec
- Ecological Association "Sveti Rok Benkovec"
- Association for the Promotion of Vegetarianism and a Healthy Lifestyle - Food for Health
- Croatian Schoenstatt Family
- Media Start Association
- Youth Association for the Social Inclusion of Roma "Nukleus"
- Youth Association of the Municipality of Mala Subotica
- Aquama C.C. Cat Lovers' Association

== Education ==
- Kindergarten "Potočnica"
- Elementary School Mala Subotica
- Regional school Držimurec-Strelec, a primary school mainly for Romani children

== Gallery ==
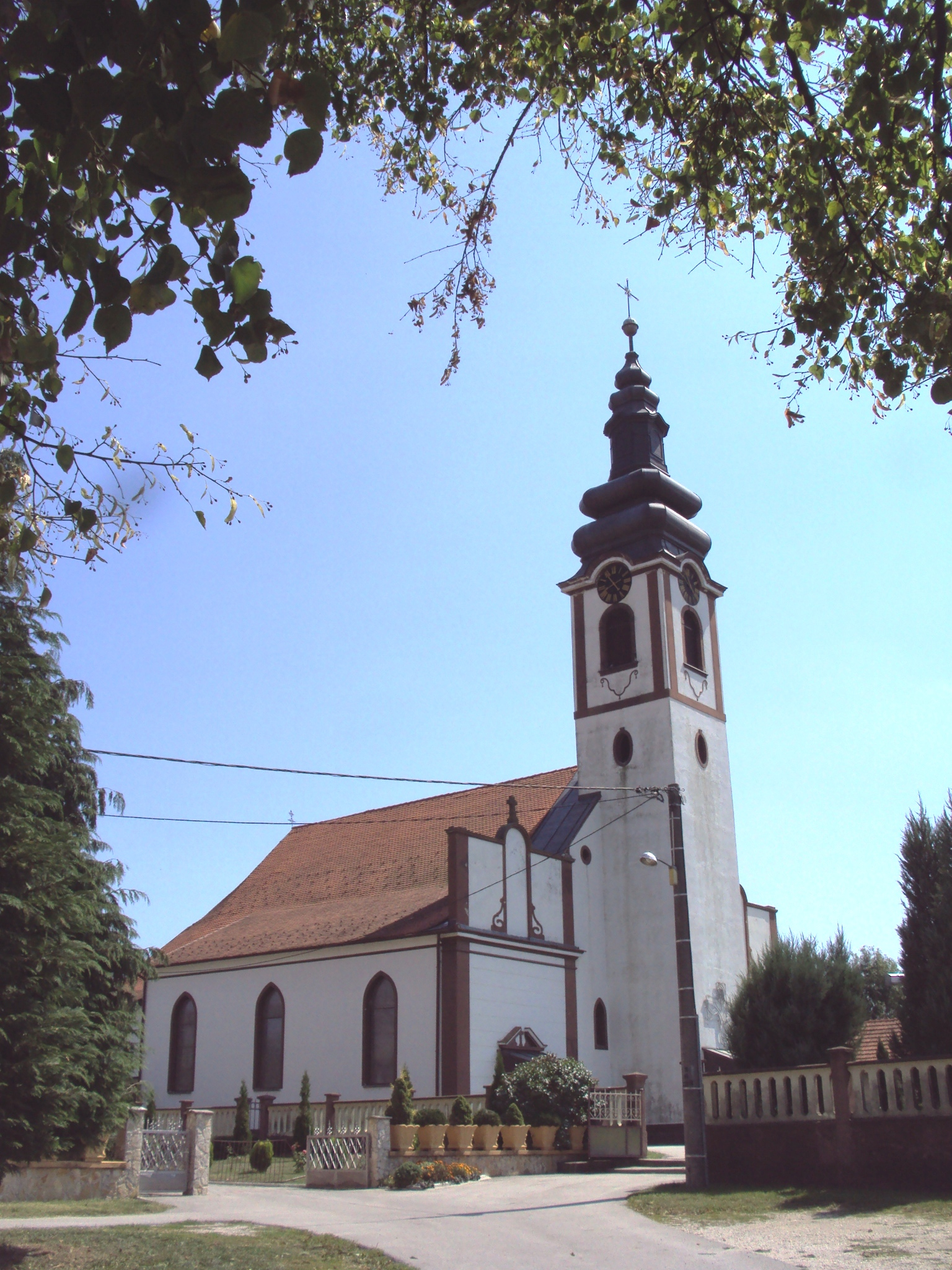
Church of Virgin Mary

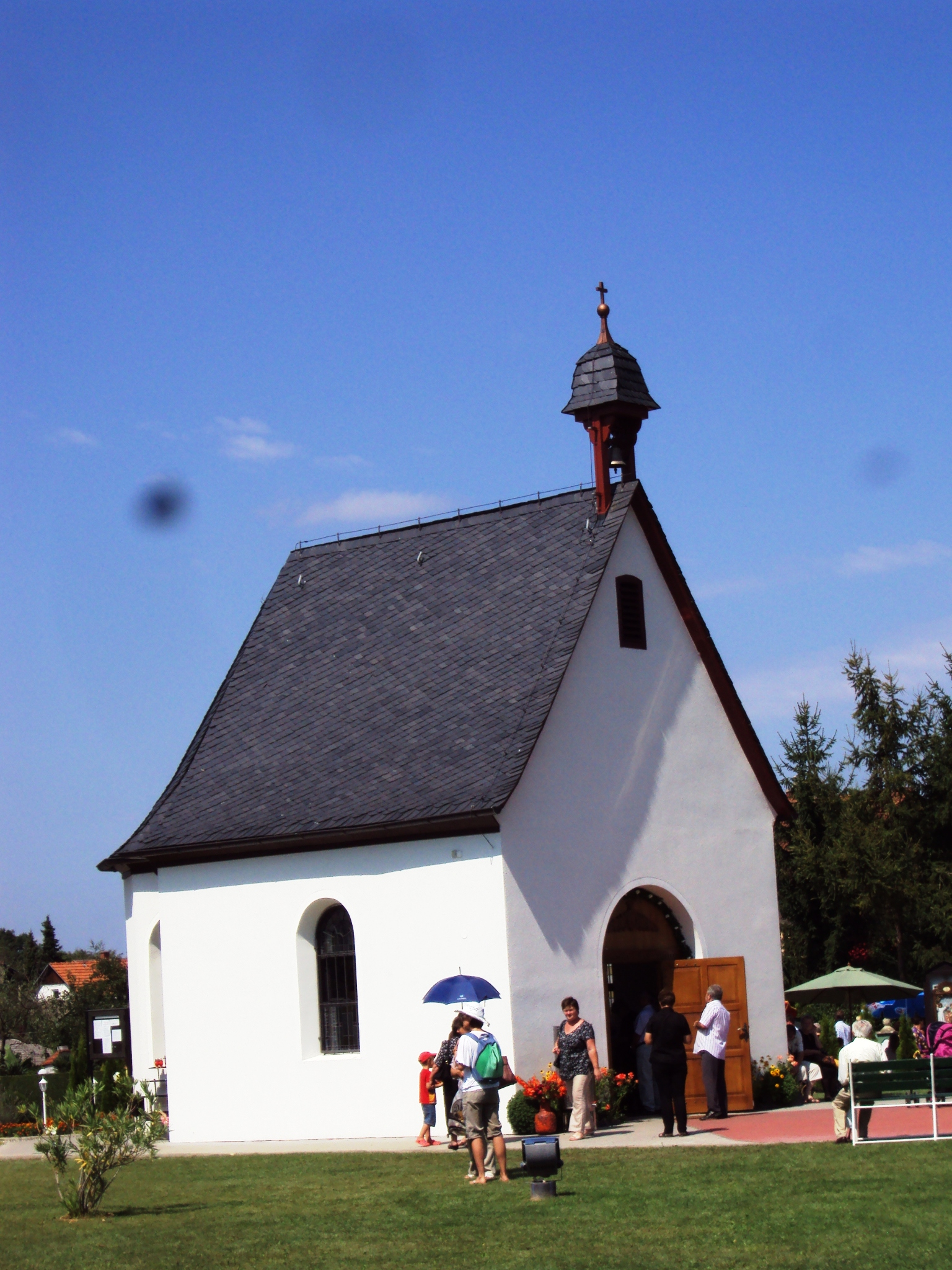
Schoenstatt shrine

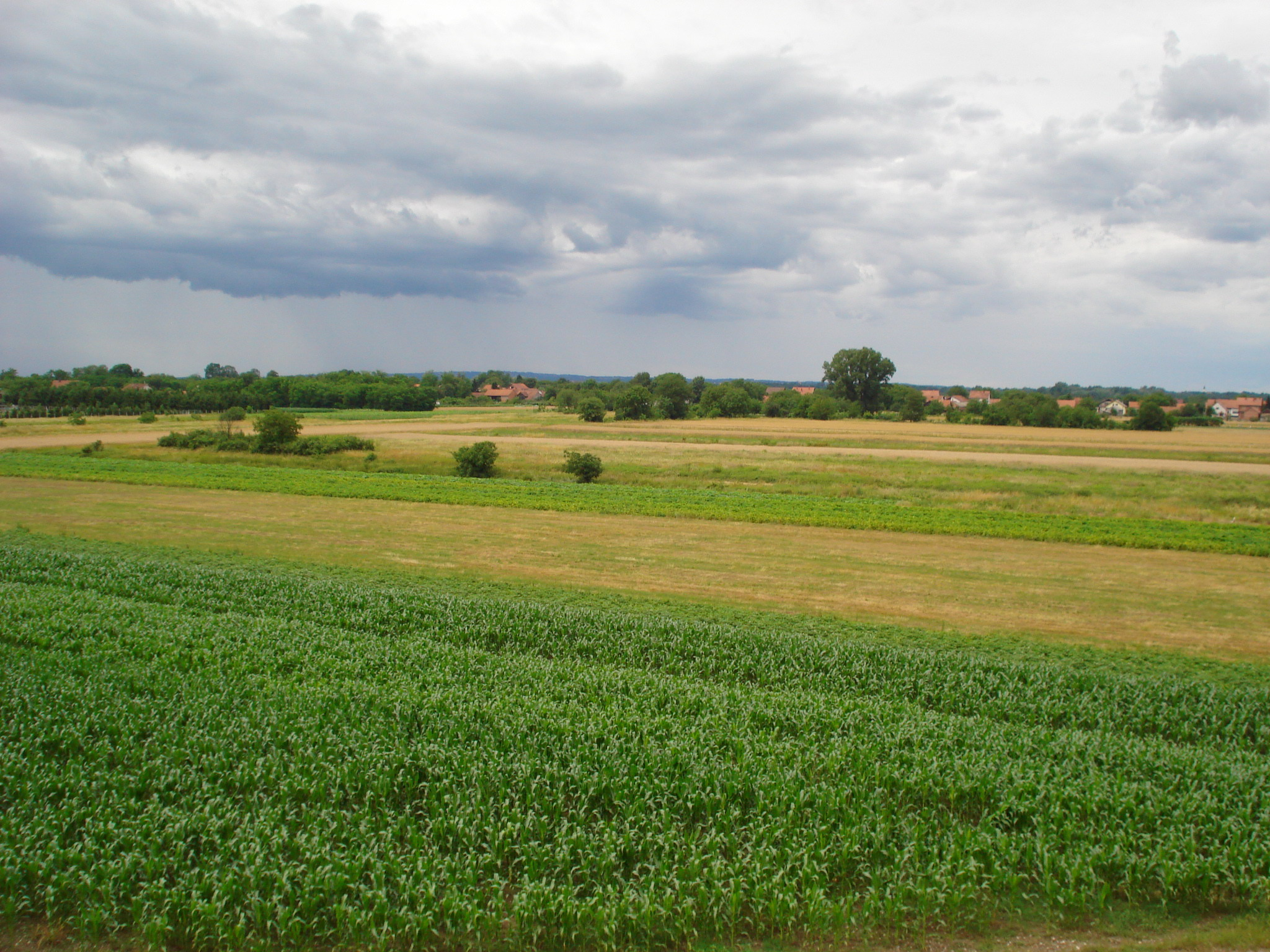
Agricultural fields near the village

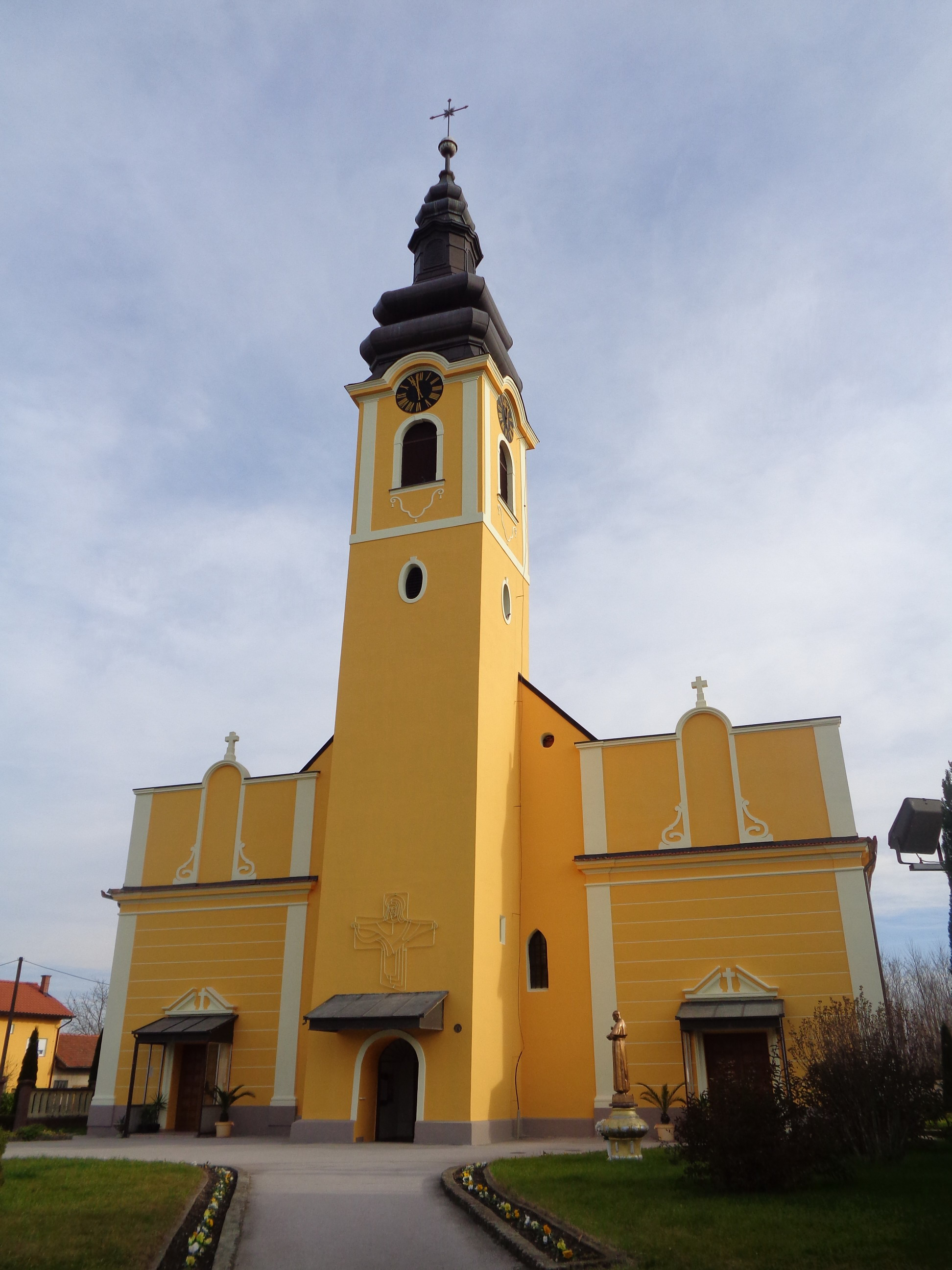
Renovated Church of Virgin Mary
