= Trnovec, Međimurje County =

Trnovec
- Village
- Location within Croatia
- Coordinates: 46°23′10″N 16°18′43″E
- Country: Croatia
- County: Međimurje County
- Municipality: Nedelišće

Area
  - Total: 4.2 km^{2} (1.6 sq mi)

Population (2021)
  - Total: 346
  - Density: 82/km^{2} (210/sq mi)
- Time zone: UTC+1 (CET)
  - Summer (DST): UTC+2 (CEST)
- Postal code: 4000 Čakovec
- Area code: +385 40

Trnovec (Hungarian: Drávamagyaród) is a village in northern Croatia, part of the Nedelišće municipality within Međimurje County.

== History ==
Trnovec is first time mentioned in charter issued in year 1478 as Ternacz Maius. Catholic Chapel in Trnovec was built in the year 1908.

== Geography ==
Trnovec is about 11 kilometres west from the centre of Čakovec, and some 90 kilometres north of Zagreb.

Trnovec is situated in the alluvial plane of river Drava, on rivers left bank.

There is a border crossing with Slovenia just outside the village. Border crossing is located on road that connects county seat Čakovec with town of Ormož in Slovenia.

Trnovec had a population of 390 in 2011 census.

Historical population

Year	Pop.	±%
1921	348	—
1931	388	+11.5%
1948	476	+22.7%
1953	514	+8.0%
1961	570	+10.9%

Year	Pop.	±%
1971	645	+13.2%
1981	807	+25.1%
1991	992	+22.9%
2001	1,189	+19.9%
2011	390 (Note: In year 2005 part of the village of Trnovec, called Parag, became a separate settlement. As the result, there is a sharp drop in population number.)	−67.2%
