= Gornji Mihaljevec =

- Municipality
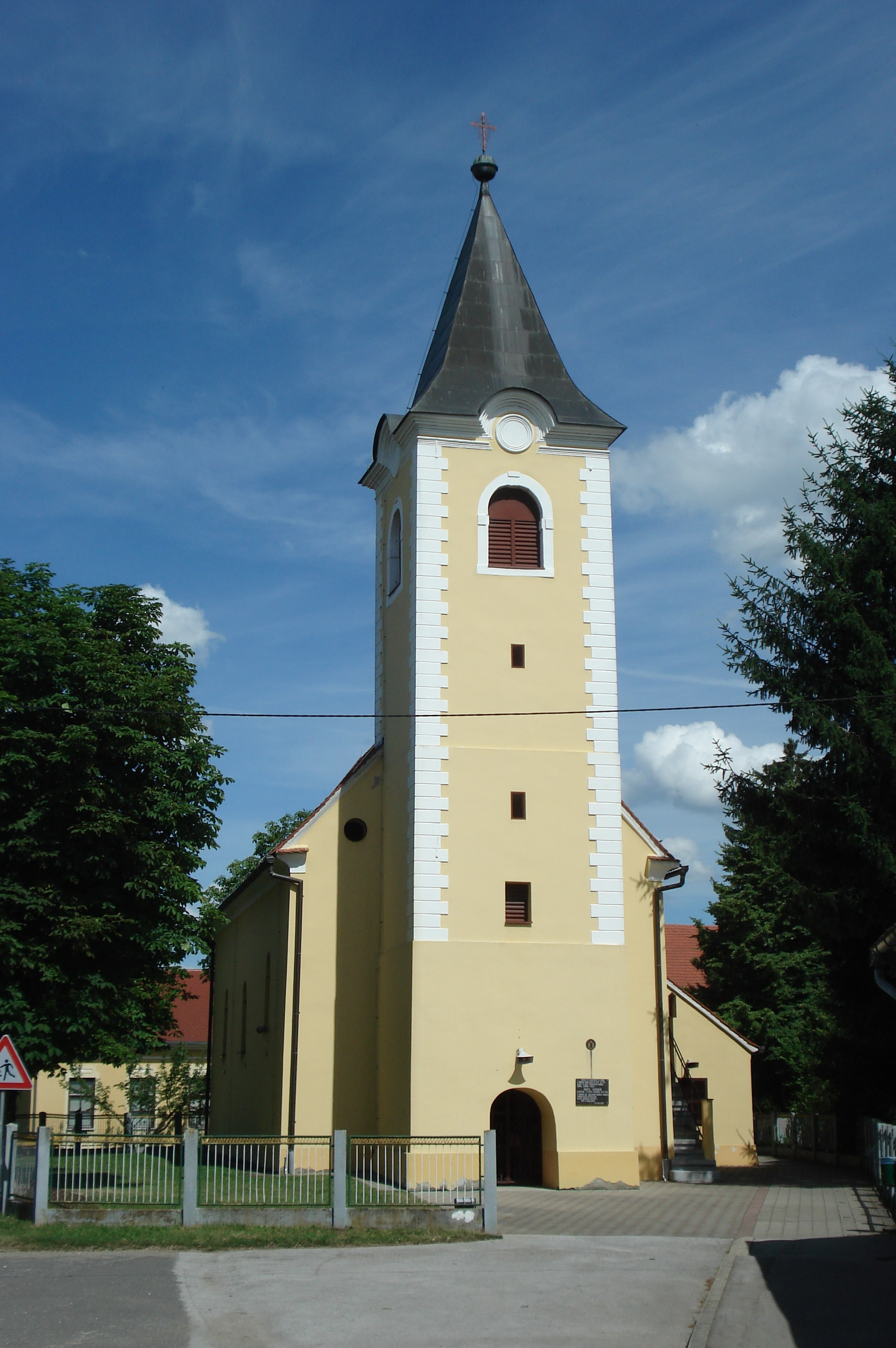
- Church of Saint Catherine

- Location within Croatia
- Coordinates: 46°26′N 16°22′E
- Country: Croatia
- Region: Northern Croatia (Međimurje)
- County: Međimurje County

Government
  - Municipal mayor: Goran Lovrec (Independent)

Area
  - Municipality: 32.1 km^{2} (12.4 sq mi)
  - Urban: 5.0 km^{2} (1.9 sq mi)

Population (2021)
  - Municipality: 1,740
  - Density: 54.2/km^{2} (140/sq mi)
  - Urban: 233
  - Urban density: 47/km^{2} (120/sq mi)
- Time zone: UTC+1 (CET)
  - Summer (DST): UTC+2 (CEST)
- Postal code: 40000 Čakovec
- Website: gornjimihaljevec.hr

Gornji Mihaljevec (Hungarian: Felsőmihályfalva) is a village and municipality in Međimurje County, in northern Croatia.

== History ==
The oldest archaeological finds in the Gornji Mihaljevec municipality are from the Roman period. Fragments of Roman roads were found in the villages of Preseka, Prhovec, Martinuševec and Tupkovec. These fragments are part of a road that led from Poetovio to Carnuntum.

Gornji Mihaljevec was first mentioned in a charter issued in the year 1478 as Michalowecz Maius. In 1789, the parish of Saint Catherine was established in Gornji Mihaljevec.

In October 1931 the villages Badličan, Preseka, and Prhovec were separated from the Čakovec District and the rest of Međimurje and were placed under the authority of the Ptuj District in Drava Banovina. But only a month later, in November 1931, all three villages were again reincorporated into Međimurje.

The Municipality of Gornji Mihaljevec was established in 1997.

== Geography ==
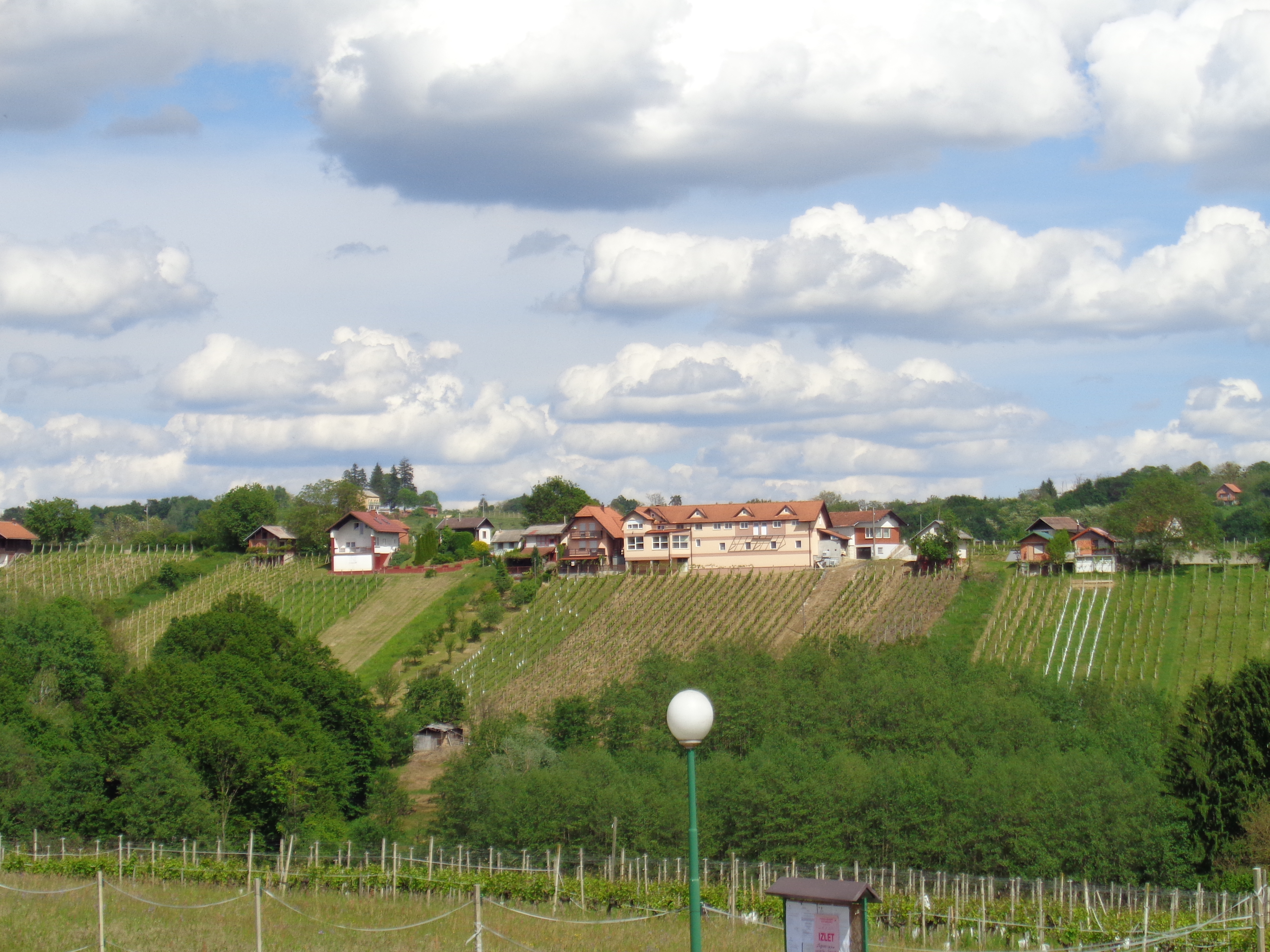
Landscape of Gornji Mihaljevec municipality

Gornji Mihaljevec is located in a part of Međimurje called Gornje Međimurje at the border with Slovenia. The village of Gornji Mihaljevec, is about 15 kilometres west from Čakovec, and some 100 kilometres north of Zagreb. The municipality covers an area of 32.15 km^{2}.

The landscape of Gornji Mihaljevec consists of low hills called Međimurske gorice, covered with vineyards, orchards and woodlands. There is a border crossing with Slovenia in the village of Preseka which connects the municipality with the village of Središče ob Dravi.

== Demographics ==
In the 2021 census, the municipality had a population of 1,740 in the following settlements:

Village	Population
Badličan	90
Bogdanovec	115
Dragoslavec Breg	116
Dragoslavec Selo	200
Gornja Dubrava	195
Gornji Mihaljevec	233
Martinuševec	110
Preseka	63
Prhovec	112
Tupkovec	83
Vugrišinec	196
Vukanovec	227
TOTAL	1,740

Gornji Mihaljevec: Population trends 1857–2021
v

population	1715	1431	1884	1953	2160	2336	2393	2589	3007	3003	2852	2634	2388	2227	2046	1917	1740
	1857	1869	1880	1890	1900	1910	1921	1931	1948	1953	1961	1971	1981	1991	2001	2011	2021

Sources: Croatian Bureau of Statistics publications

== Administration ==
The current mayor of Gornji Mihaljevec is Goran Lovrec and the Gornji Mihaljevec Municipal Council consists of 9 seats.

Groups	Councilors per group
Independents	7 / 9
HDZ	2 / 9
