= List of prefects of Međimurje County =

This is a list of prefects of Međimurje County.

== Prefects of Međimurje County (1993–present) ==
Croatian Democratic Union (HDZ)
Croatian Social Liberal Party (HSLS)
Croatian People's Party – Liberal Democrats (HNS – LD)
Social Democratic Party of Croatia (SDP)
Independent
Independent Platform of the North (NPS)

No.	Portrait	Name (Born–Died)	Term of Office		Party
1		Marijan Ramušćak (1938–)	4 May 1993	19 June 1997	HDZ
2		Branko Levačić (1954–)	19 June 1997	9 June 2005	HSLS
3		Josip Posavec (1958–)	9 June 2005	4 June 2009	HNS – LD
4		Ivica Perhoč (1958–)	4 June 2009	7 June 2013	SDP
5		Matija Posavec (1980–)	7 June 2013	Incumbent	HNS – LD (2013–2019)
5		Matija Posavec (1980–)	7 June 2013	Incumbent	Independent (2019-2021)
5		Matija Posavec (1980–)	7 June 2013	Incumbent	Independent Platform of the North (from 2021)

== See also ==
- Međimurje County
