= Ignacije Szentmartony =

Croatian Jesuit priest

Ignacije Szentmartony (October 28, 1718 – April 15, 1793) was a Croatian Jesuit priest, missionary, mathematician, astronomer, explorer and cartographer.

== Biography ==
Szentmartony was born in Kottori, Kingdom of Hungary (today Kotoriba, Međimurje, Croatia), to a Croat mother and a Hungarian father. After graduating from secondary school he entered the order of Jesuits in Vienna in 1735. He studied in Vienna and Graz, (Austria) where he also lectured mathematics. By the year 1751, he was in Lisbon, Portugal where he obtained the title of royal mathematician and astronomer. With those credentials, he became a member of an expedition that worked on the rearrangement of the frontiers among Portuguese and Spanish colonies in South America.

In 1753, he sailed for Brazil into the very mouth of the Amazon River. Based on his surveys, Lorenz Kaulen made in 1753 a map of Maranhão district titled Mappa Viceprovinciae Societatis Iesu Maragnonii anno MDCCLIII concinnata. Its original is in Biblioteca de Évora in Portugal. Another map, Mapa da Ilha do Maranhão, made in 1757 again based upon Szentmartony's surveys, is also kept here. Between 1754-56, Father Szentmartony took part in expeditions to the Amazon and the Rio Negro. Upon the data obtained from his systematical astronomical surveys, in 1755 engineers Schwebel and Sturm made a regional map titled Mappa Geographico dos Rios. It was a first-rate cartographic representation of the riverbed containing data relating to islets, tributaries and settlements.

He complained vigorously about the inhumane treatment of the native people by the colonizers, so his expedition came under scrutiny and failed. Szentmartony remained as a missionary in the settlement of Ibyrajuba near Pará. In 1760 he was deported with other persecuted Jesuits, put in prison and released in 1777 upon the intervention of the Empress Maria Theresa. He returned to Croatia in 1780. In 1773 his religious order was suppressed. A priest in Belica (Belicza), he died in Čakovec (Csáktornya) in 1793.

He is also believed to be the author of Einleitung zur kroatischen Sprachlehre für Teutschen, the first Kajkavian grammar, published in 1783 in Varaždin.

== See also ==
- List of Jesuit scientists
- List of Roman Catholic scientist-clerics
