= Međimurje County =

County in northern Croatia

Međimurje County Međimurska županija (Croatian)
- County
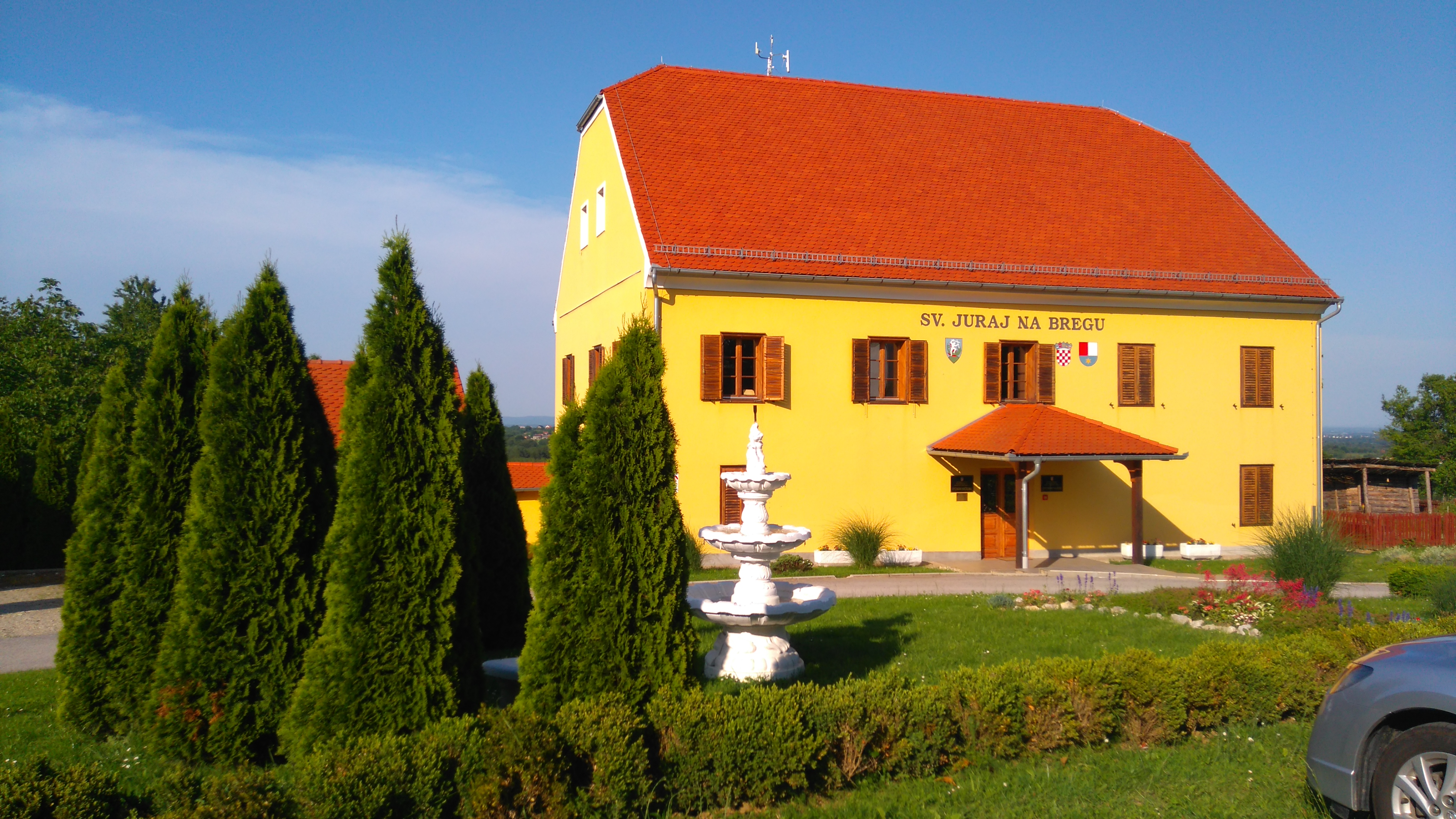
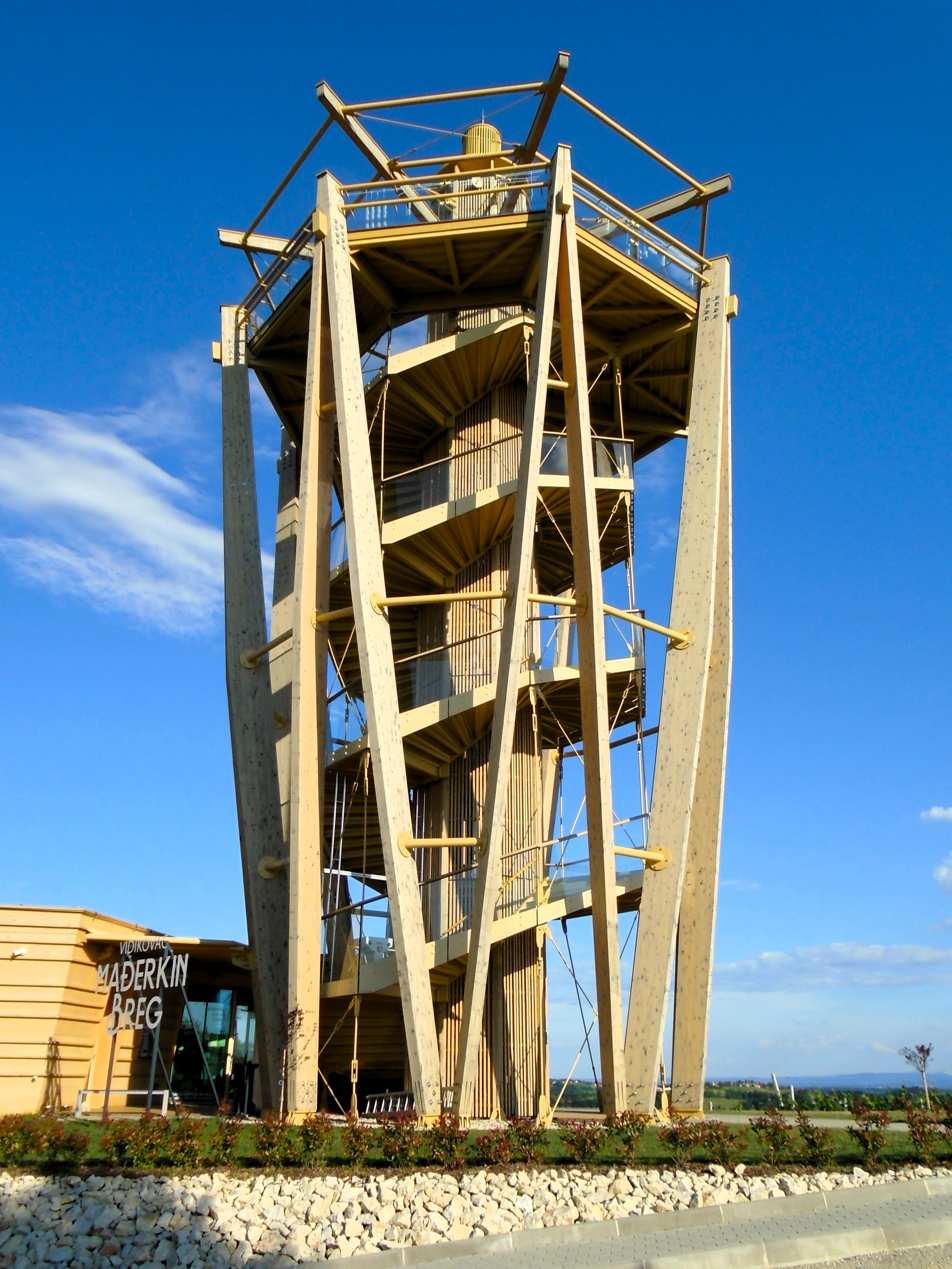
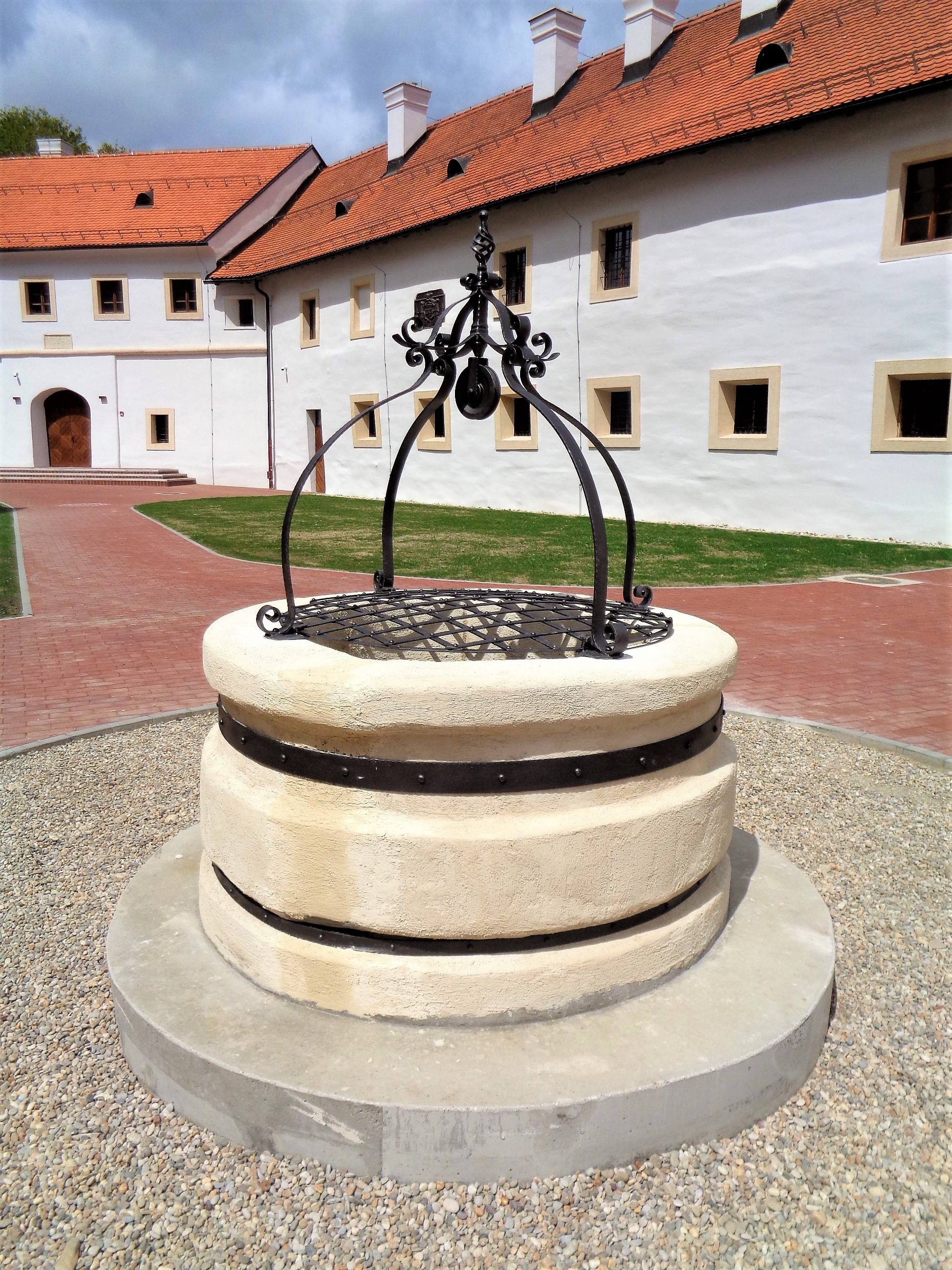
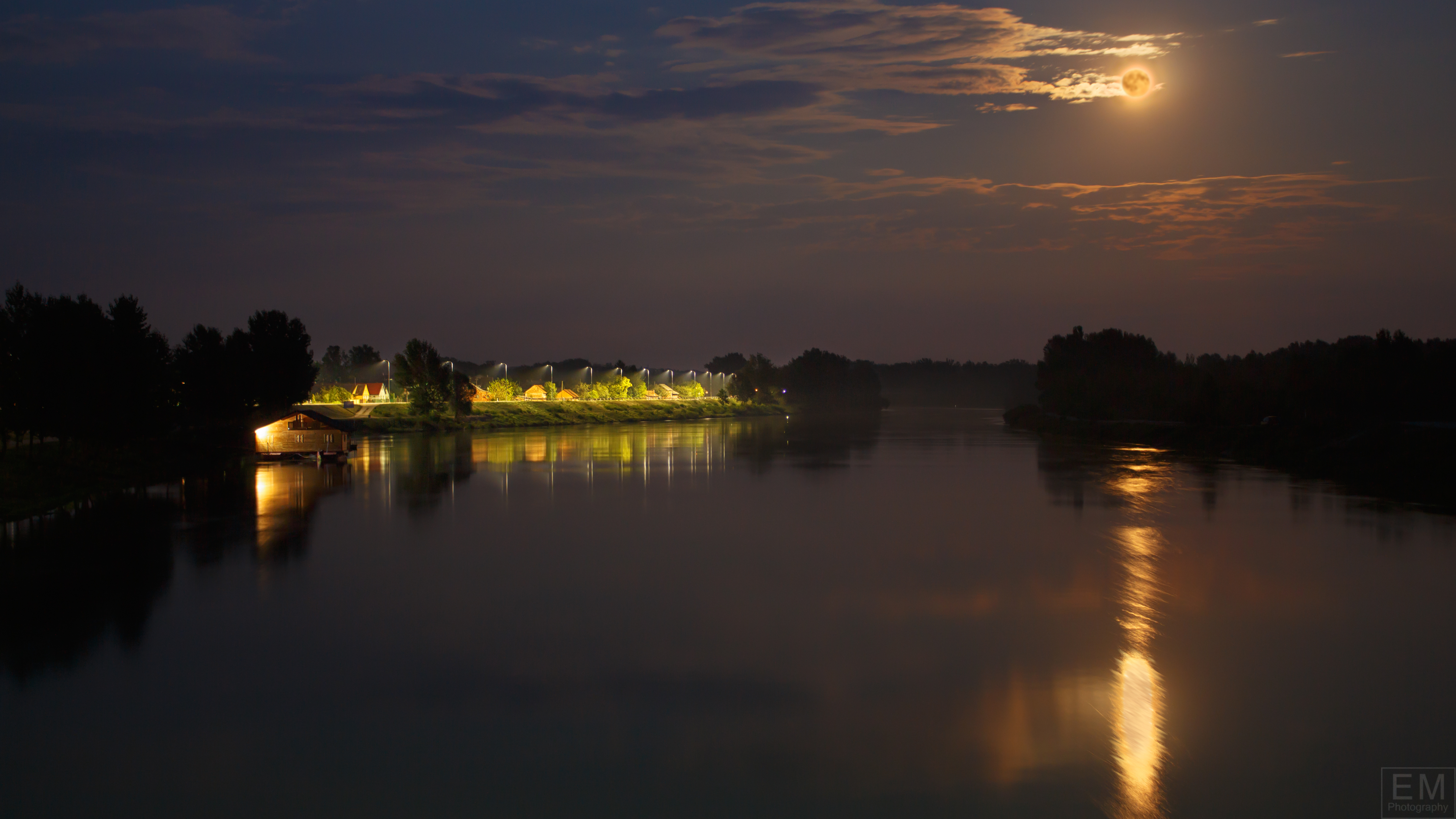
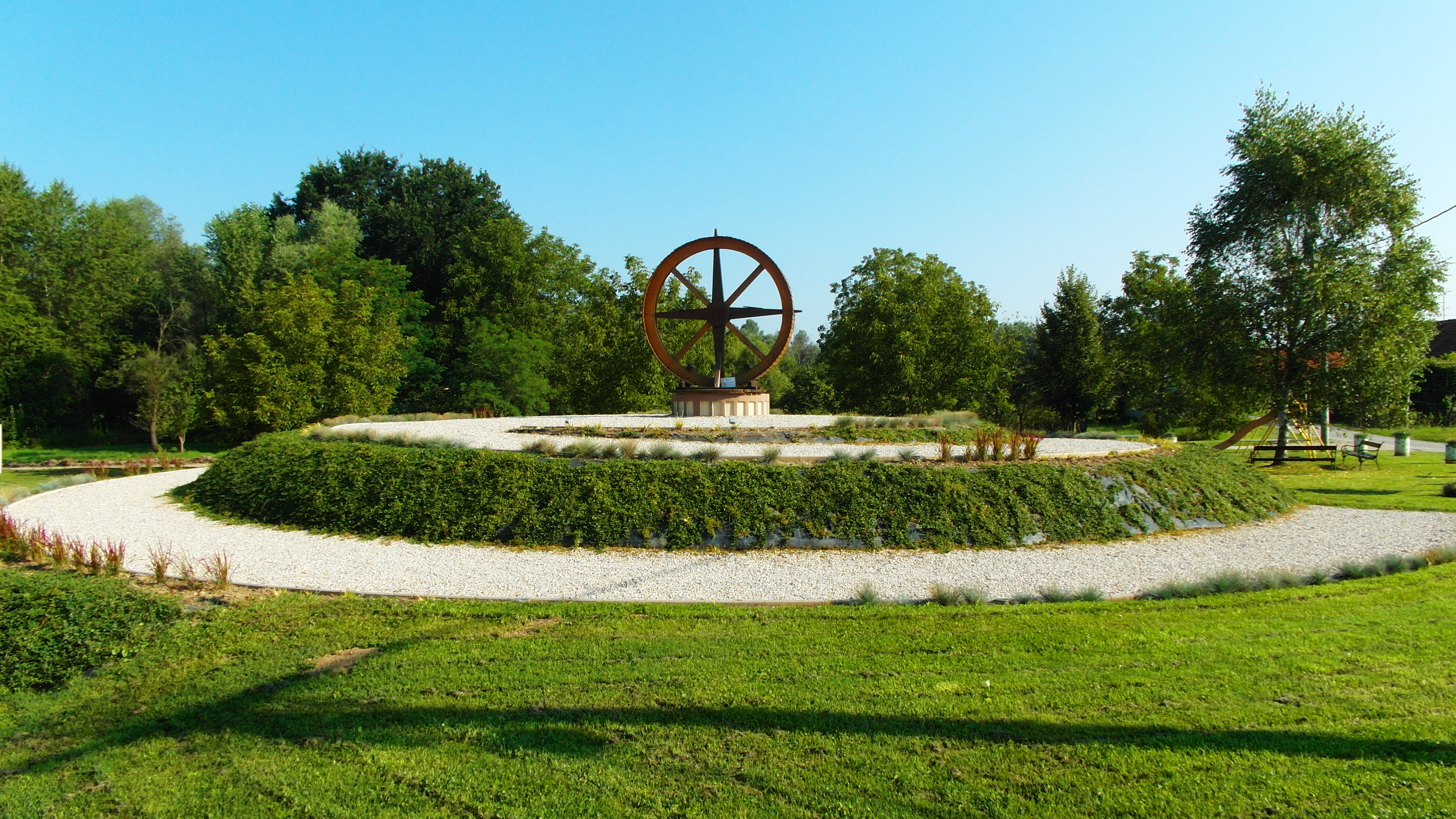
- Clockwise from top: Sveti Juraj na Bregu, Čakovec Castle inner court, the northernmost point of Croatia, Drava river, observation deck in Robadje

- Flag Coat of arms

- Međimurje County within Croatia
- Coordinates: 46.466°N 16.414°E
- Country: Croatia
- County seat: Čakovec

Government
  - Župan (Prefect): Matija Posavec (NPS)
  - Assembly: 37 members

Area
  - Total: 729 km^{2} (281 sq mi)

Population (2021)
  - Total: 105,250
  - Density: 144/km^{2} (374/sq mi)
- Area code: 040
- ISO 3166 code: HR-20
- HDI (2022): 0.856 very high · 10th
- Website: Međimurska županija

Međimurje County (pronounced [medʑǐmuːrje]; Croatian: Međimurska županija [medʑǐmurskaː ʒupǎnija]; Hungarian: Muraköz megye) is the northernmost county of Croatia, roughly corresponding to the historical and geographical region of Međimurje. It is the smallest Croatian county by size, and the second most densely populated after the City of Zagreb. The county's seat and main urban centre is Čakovec.

The county borders Slovenia in the north-west and Hungary in the east. The south-eastern corner of the county is near the town of Legrad and the confluence of the Mura into the Drava. The closest cities include Varaždin and Koprivnica in Croatia, Lendava, Murska Sobota and Maribor in Slovenia, as well as Nagykanizsa in Hungary and Graz in Austria.

Međimurje County map

== Name ==
Besides its Croatian name (Međimurska županija), the county is also known as Muraköz megye in Hungarian, Medžimurska županija in Slovene, and Murinsel in German.

== Geography ==
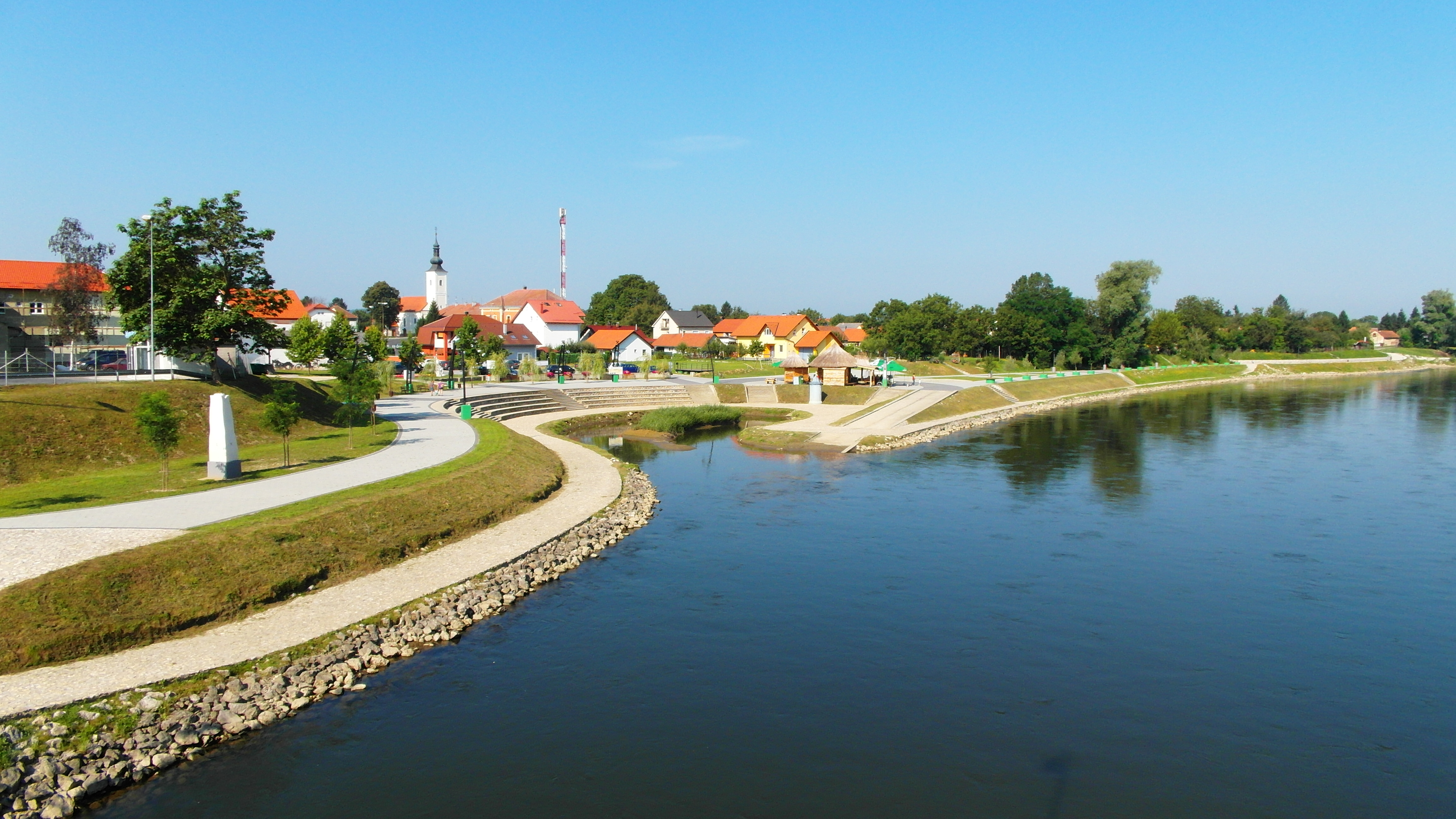
Mura river at Mursko Središće

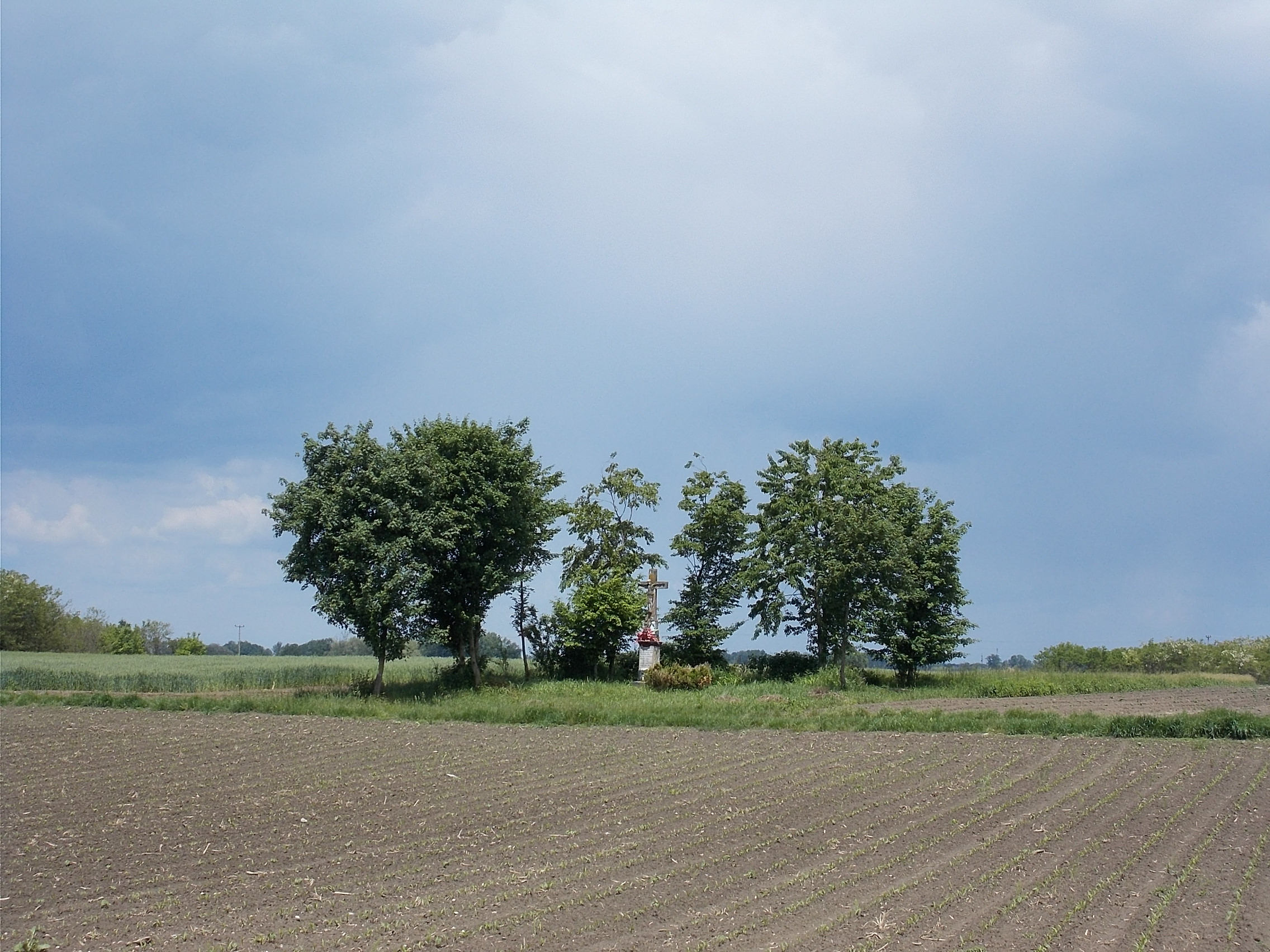
Pannonian plain near Prelog

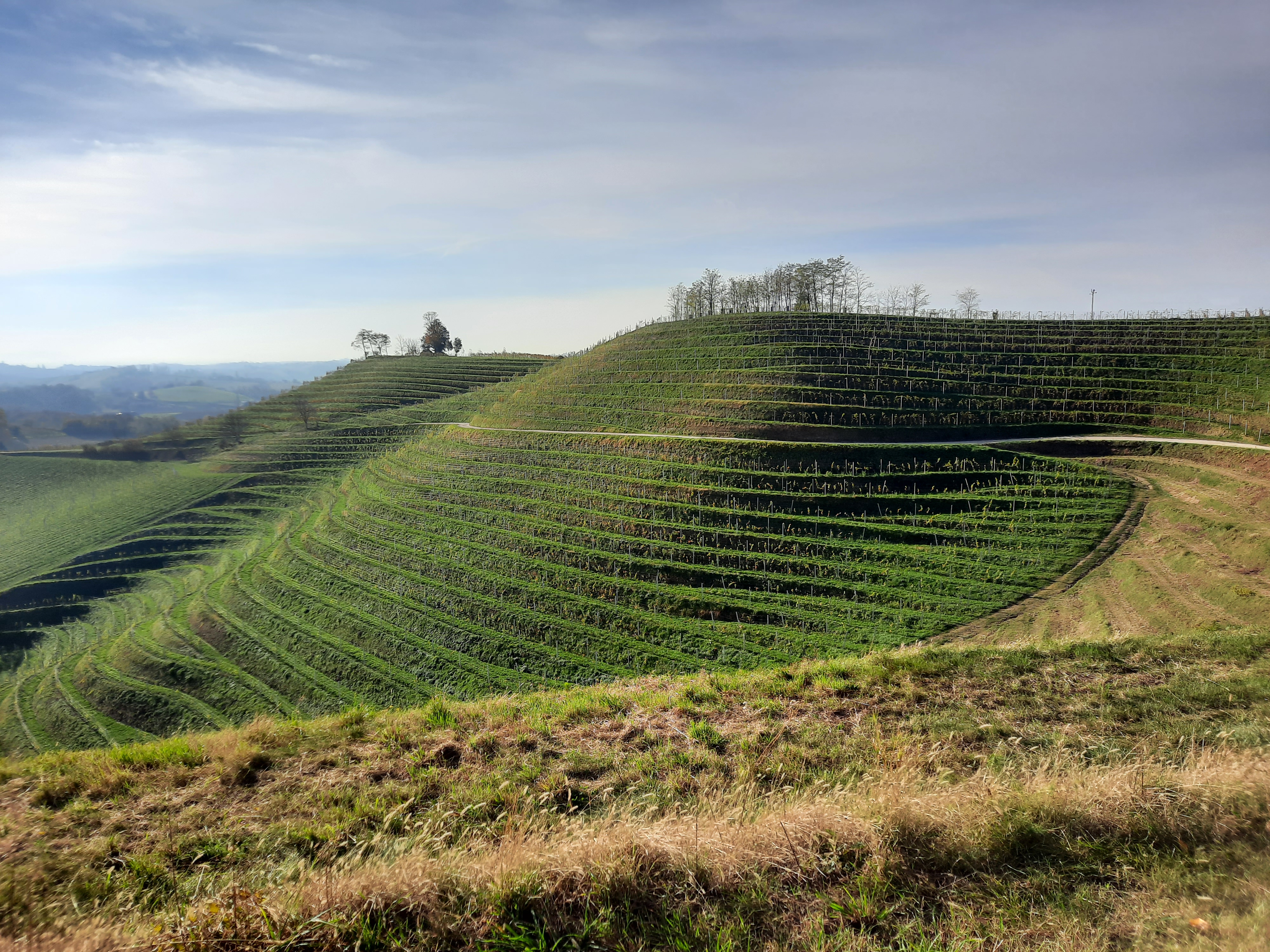
Upper Međimurje hills

Međimurje is the smallest Croatian county, not including the City of Zagreb, with an area of 729.5 km^{2}. With an average population of 156 people/km^{2}, it is also the most densely populated Croatian county, if the City of Zagreb is not included.

Međimurje County is located in the Pannonian Basin between two rivers – the Mura and the Drava. The Mura flows along the county's northern border with the Slovenian region of Prekmurje (Municipality of Lendava, Municipality of Ljutomer and Municipality of Ormož) and its eastern border with Hungary's Zala County, while the Drava flows along the county's southern border with two other Croatian counties – Varaždin County and Koprivnica-Križevci County. The Trnava River flows through the middle of the county.

There are two reservoir lakes on the Drava – Lake Varaždin and Lake Dubrava – both built to serve the two hydroelectric power plants based in the county. Lake Dubrava, located near the city of Prelog, is the biggest artificial lake in Croatia and the second largest lake overall in the country. The power plant using Lake Varaždin is named after the county seat, Čakovec, while the one using Lake Dubrava is named Dubrava, taking its name from the nearby village of Donja Dubrava.

The county's elevation ranges between 120 and 344 metres above sea level, the latter being the elevation of its highest hill, Mohokos. Čakovec has an elevation of between 160 and 165 metres above sea level. Throughout the past, there were occasional earthquakes in the region. One of significant strength hit the region in 1880, while another in 1738 devastated Čakovec and particularly the nearby Šenkovec.

Of the county's total area of 729.5 km^{2}, around 360 km^{2} are used in agriculture. Due to the high population density, agricultural land is divided into 21,000 units averaging 17,500 m^{2} (188,368.43 sq ft) each. 27.5 km^{2} are covered with orchards. 11 km^{2} is the hilly area, located in the north-western part of the county, with villages like Štrigova and numerous vineyards. Grasslands and forests cover an area of around 105 km^{2}. The biggest forest is Murščak, located between Domašinec and Donji Hrašćan.

=== Climate ===
The climate is continental. Summers are quite hot. Daily temperatures during the summer months usually range between 20 °C and 30 °C, but can reach as high as 40 °C in July and August, when they can also stay above 30 °C for several days. Thunderstorms and rapid weather changes are common throughout the summer months, as well as in late spring, with a particularly stormy period being between mid-June and mid-July, when they often occur on a daily basis.

Springs and autumns are usually calm, although rapid weather changes can also be common during the two seasons. Winters can be very severe, with early-morning temperatures sometimes reaching as low as -20 °C. During the winter months, daily temperatures usually range between -10 °C and 10 °C. January is usually the coldest month, during which daily temperatures can stay below 0 °C for several days. Snowfall usually occurs between late October and early March. Fog can be a common early-morning occurrence between late summer and early spring, with all-day fog sometimes occurring during the coldest months.

Warm weather, with daily temperatures around 15 °C, can occur as early as mid-February and as late as mid-November. In early October and late March, daily temperatures can also reach as high as 20 °C. However, February and November are generally cold months, with occasional heavy snow and daily temperatures around 0 °C, while March and October are generally cool, with occasional light snow and daily temperatures ranging between 0 °C and 15 °C. In March and October, it is also common for the temperature to drop below 0 °C over night, even when the daily temperature is in the range between 10 °C and 15 °C.

== Administrative division ==
Međimurje County is divided into 3 towns and 22 municipalities:

- Town of Čakovec (county seat)
- Town of Prelog
- Town of Mursko Središće
- Municipality of Belica
- Municipality of Dekanovec
- Municipality of Domašinec
- Municipality of Donja Dubrava
- Municipality of Donji Kraljevec
- Municipality of Donji Vidovec
- Municipality of Goričan
- Municipality of Gornji Mihaljevec
- Municipality of Kotoriba
- Municipality of Mala Subotica
- Municipality of Nedelišće
- Municipality of Orehovica
- Municipality of Podturen
- Municipality of Pribislavec
- Municipality of Selnica
- Municipality of Strahoninec
- Municipality of Sveta Marija
- Municipality of Sveti Juraj na Bregu
- Municipality of Sveti Martin na Muri
- Municipality of Šenkovec
- Municipality of Štrigova
- Municipality of Vratišinec

== Demographics ==
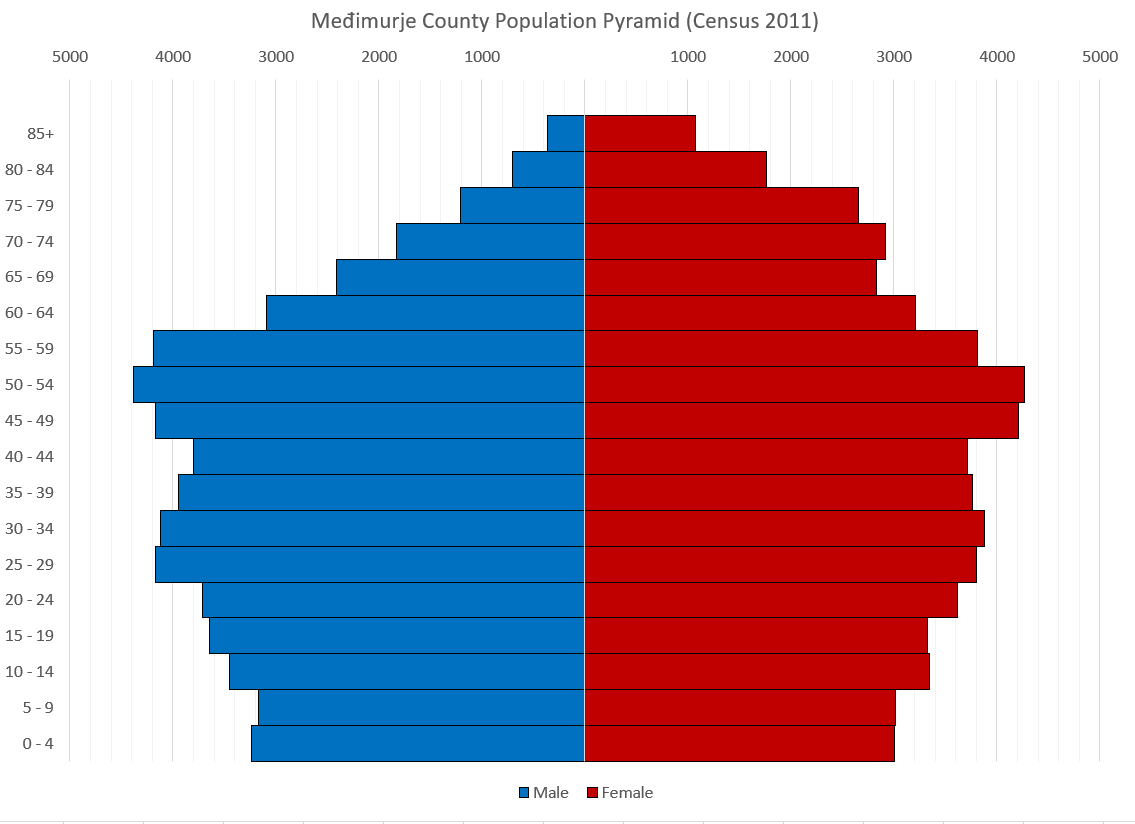
Population pyramid of Međimurje County per the 2011 Census

In the 2021 census, the total population of the county was 105,250 with the majority being Croats at 90.33%. Romani were 6.61% of the population, Slovenes were 0.39%, Albanians were 0.21% and Serbs were 0.18%.

Međimurje County: Population trends 1857–2021
v

population	55412	61397	66638	73728	79808	88623	92760	99346	110686	112551	112073	115660	116825	119866	118426	113804	105250
	1857	1869	1880	1890	1900	1910	1921	1931	1948	1953	1961	1971	1981	1991	2001	2011	2021

Sources: Croatian Bureau of Statistics publications

== Administration ==
The current prefect of Međimurje County is Matija Posavec (NPS) and the Međimurje County Assembly consists of 37 seats.

Groups	Members per group
NPS-HSU-HSLS-DOSIP-HSS-SU	22 / 37
SDP-MDS	8 / 37
HDZ-HDS	7 / 37

== History ==
=== Early history ===
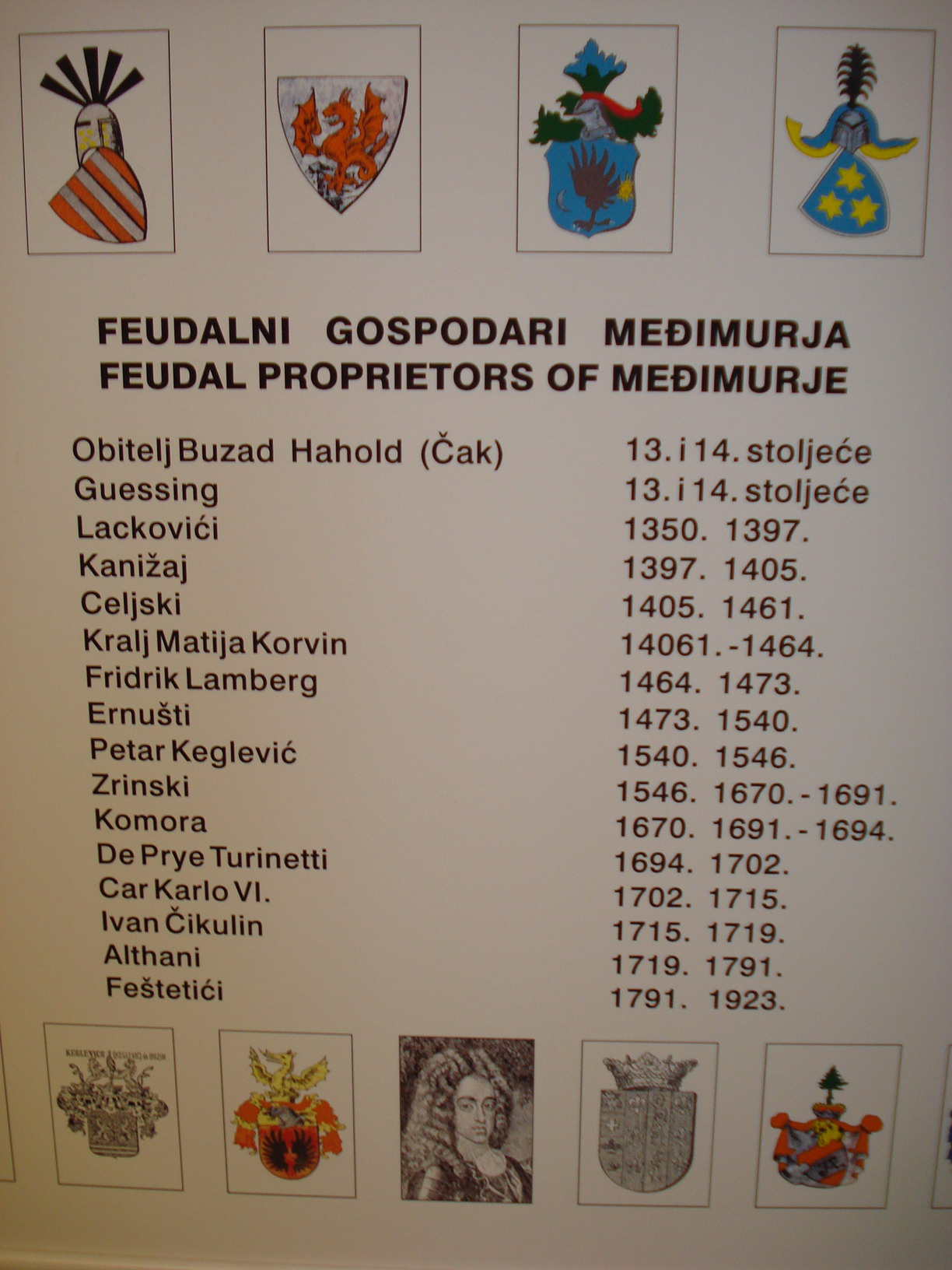
Feudal proprietors of Međimurje

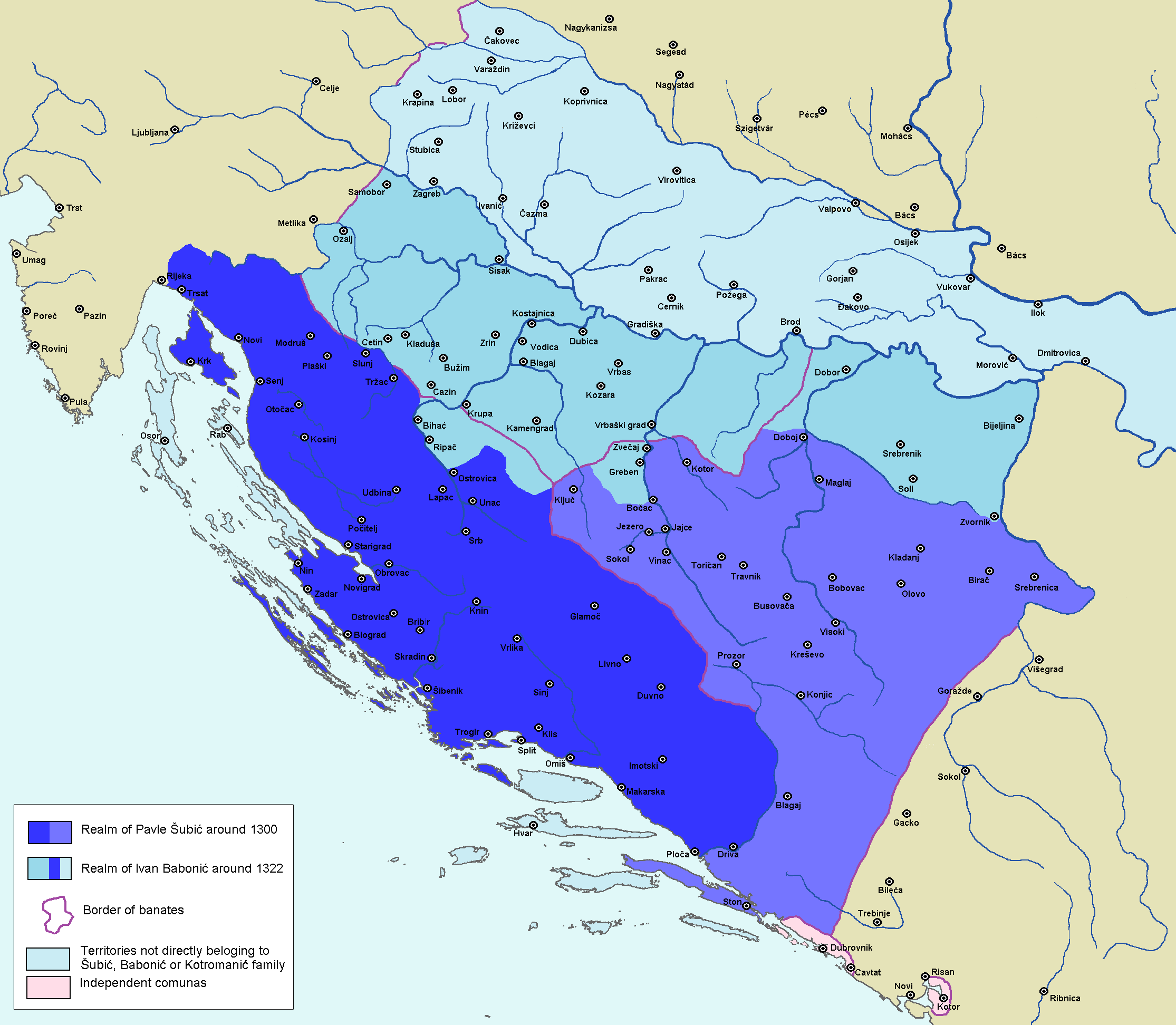
On the 14th-century map of Croatian lands, Međimurje is part of Slavonia (light blue)

The first organized human habitations here can be traced back to the Stone Age. There is a Neolithic site called Ferenčica near Prelog. There are archaeological sites that date from the Bronze Age, and 3rd century sites called Ciglišće and Varaščine.

During the Iron Age, the Indo-European tribes identified in the area were Celts, Serretes and Pannonians, and the region became part of the Roman Empire. In the 1st century, the Romans knew the area as Insula intra Dravam et Muram ("island between the Drava and Mura rivers") according to the geographer Strabo. The most important settlement they established was Halikan (Halicanum). The region was part of the Roman province of Pannonia and later part of the Pannonia Superior.

Čakovec was originally called Aquama ("the wet city"), because the area was marshland. During the Migration Period, many different tribes, such as Huns, Visigoths, and Ostrogoths, passed through the region. The region was part of the Kingdom of the Ostrogoths, the state of the Lombards, the Avar Khaganate, and the Frankish Kingdom. The Slavs, which settled this region in the 6th century, gained independence after destruction of the Avar Khaganate. In the 9th century, it was included in the Slavic state of Lower Pannonia. According to some sources, the area was also part of the Great Moravia.

=== Medieval history ===
The Hungarians occupied the region in 896 and expanded to the river Sava, but as the Principality of Hungary transformed to the Kingdom of Hungary, the borders with the Kingdom of Croatia were set along the river Drava. In 1102 Croatia entered a personal union with the Kingdom of Hungary. During 13th century tradesmen and merchants (mostly ethnic Germans) started to arrive and began to develop the urban localities that are present today. Prelog (Perlak) was founded in 1264, shortly after the invasion of the Mongols in 1242, and the other settlements followed. Later it was part of Zala County. In the beginning of the 14th century, the area was ruled by powerful semi-independent oligarch Henrik Kőszegi.

Čakovec (Csáktornya) got its name from comes Csák Hahót, who in the mid-13th century erected the timber fortification that eventually was "Csák's tower", mentioned for the first time in 1328. King Charles I named Čakovec as the capitol in 1333. In 1350, King Louis I gave the land to viceroy (Ban) Stephen I Lackfi, a member of the ruling Lackfi family of Transylvania. It remained Lackfi property until 1397, when King Sigismund executed Stephen II Lackfi, and took back the area to the Crown.

In 1405, the Celje family received Međimurje (Muraköz) as a gift from the Crown, and the land was mortgaged. The monastery in Goričan (Goritsán) managed the administration of the seat of the main territorial dominion as an attorney of the Celje family. King Matthias Corvinus bought the mortgage and donated the land to John I Ernuszt and his son, who were Jewish merchants from Sweden, living in Buda. The monastery in Goričan, which had managed the administration of the seat of the main territorial dominion, was dissolved. The seat of the administration of the main territorial dominion Goričan came under the administration of the Bishop of Ljubljana. It remained in the hands of the Ernušts until 1526, when the family died out without heir.

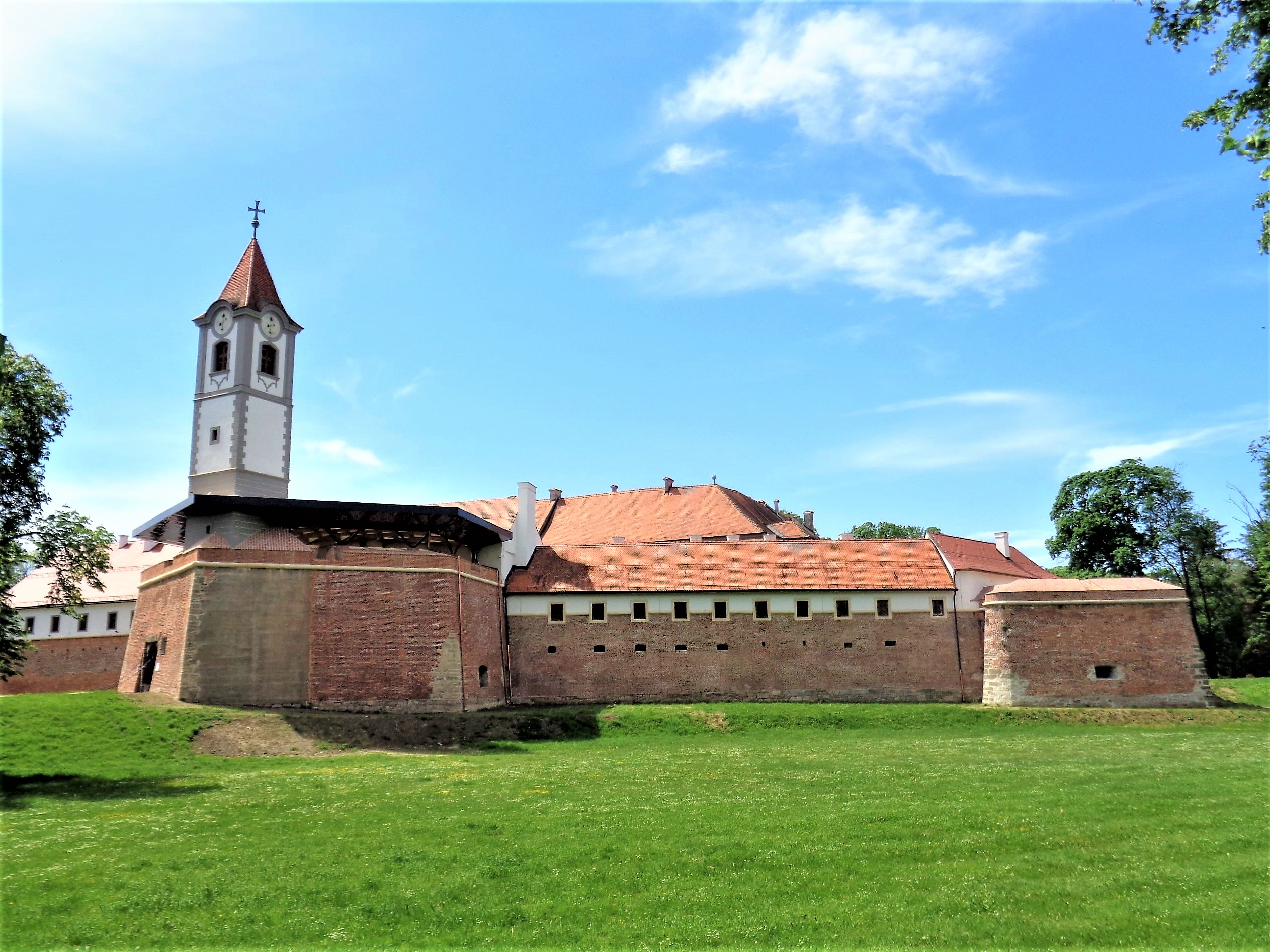
Čakovec Castle

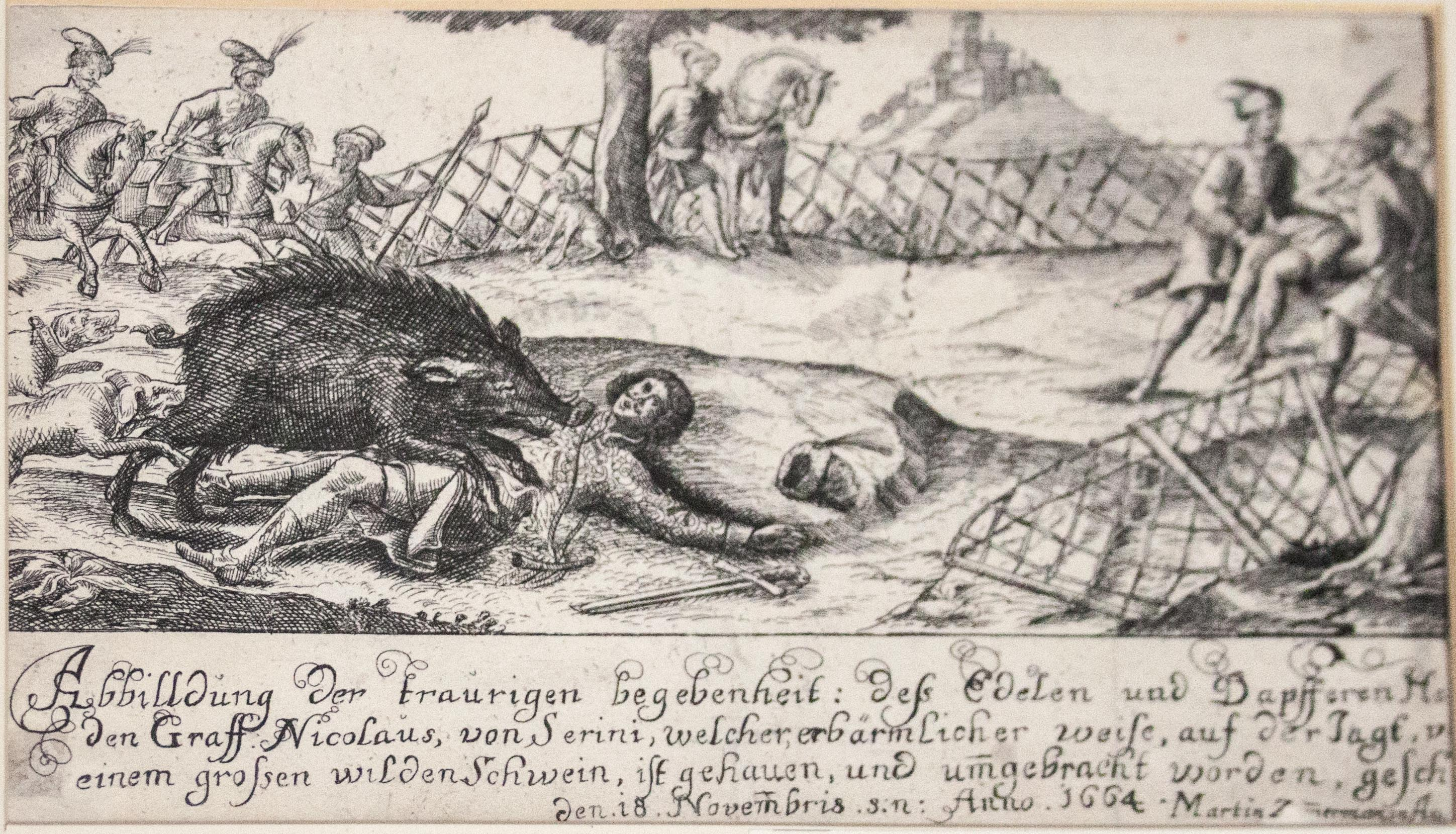
Death of Nikola Zrinski

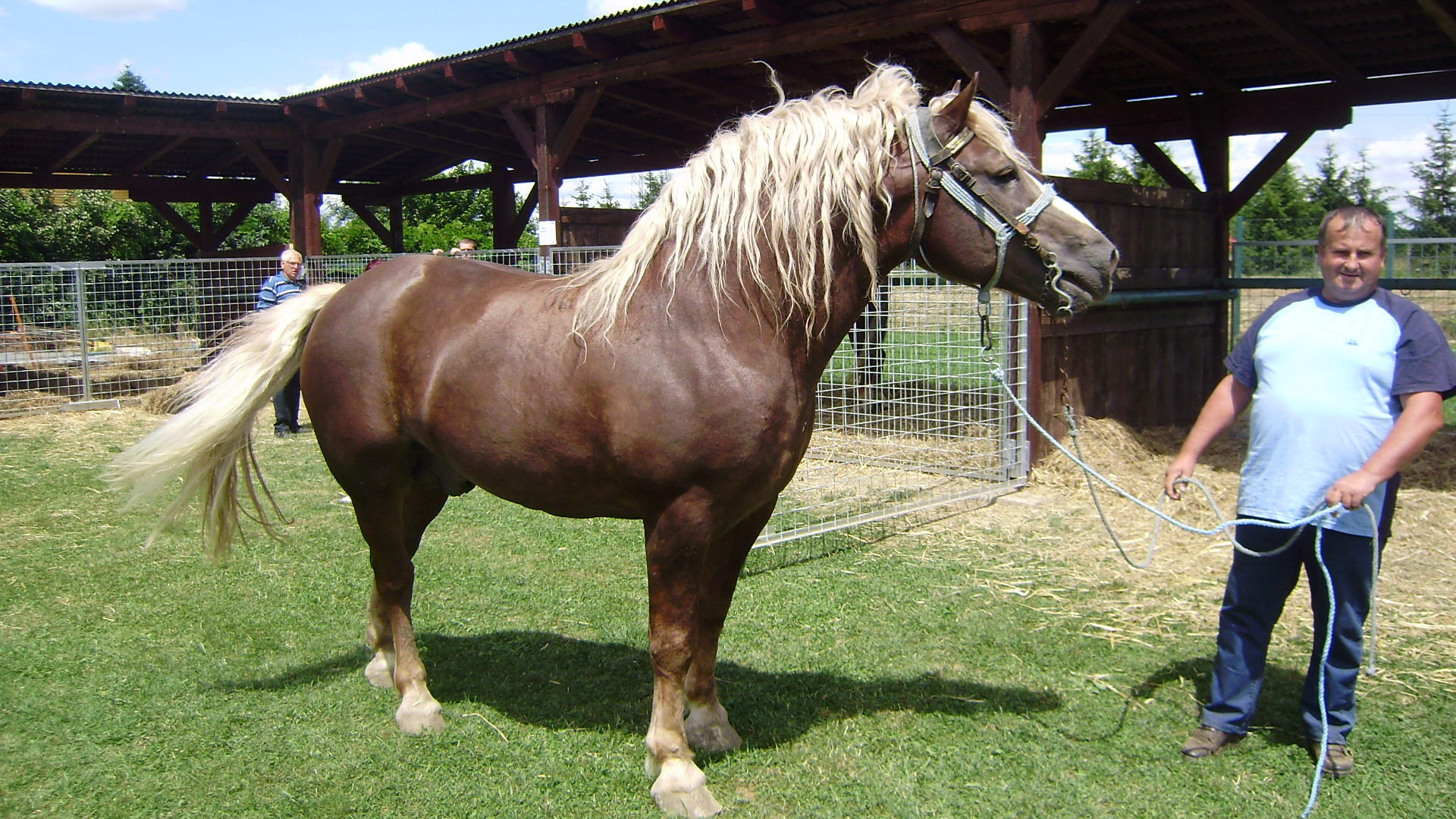
Međimurje horse is an autochthonous medium-heavy draught horse breed originating from the region

Since 1526, the region became part of the Habsburg monarchy, as did Kingdom of Hungary along with Croatia. It followed a succession and inheritance dispute between the Keglević family and the Habsburg Emperor Ferdinand I. Since 1530 until 1790 Goričan was by interdictum under the administration of the Bishop of Zagreb as an attorney of both the Emperor and the Keglević family to prevent any violent confrontations between them both, but Čakovec became the seat of the administration of the main territorial dominion in 1546, because even the Bishop Simon Erdődy (1518–1543, Bishop of Zagreb) could not prevent a violent confrontation between the Emperor and Petar Keglević in 1542/43. In 1546 the Diet in Pressburg (Pozsony, today's Bratislava) approved the transfer of Čakovec and Međimurje to Nikola Šubić Zrinski.

Rapid development began in 1547 under the ruling Zrinski family. In 1579 the craftsmen and merchants outside the walls of Čakovec Castle (csáktornyai kastély) were granted the right to trade; this was the beginning of the formal and legal city structure. The area was of importance as a trade center with Habsburg Kingdom of Croatia and Habsburg Kingdom of Hungary positioned nearby on the main roads, facilitating the exchange of goods, crafts and ideas. The region was also a military buffer zone against the expanding Ottoman Empire.

Nikola Šubić Zrinski ruled as Nicholas IV (1508–1566). He was a hero of the Battle of Szigetvár of the Habsburg-Ottoman wars. Then followed his son, Juraj IV Zrinski (George IV), until 1603, and his grandson Nikola VI. Zrinski (Nicholas VI) until 1624. Next was another grandson, a brother of Nicholas VI, Juraj V Zrinski (George V). He was poisoned in 1626 by the general Albrecht Wallenstein in Pressburg and was buried in Pauline Monastery of Sveta Jelena (St. Helen in English) near Čakovec, next to the graves of his ancestors. He was followed by his son Nikola VII Zrinski (Nicholas VII), (1620–1664), a famous Croatian Ban. At the coronation of Ferdinand IV, he carried the sword of state and was made Captain General of Croatia. He was killed while hunting in the forest near Kuršanec (Kursanecz), apparently by a wounded wild boar, but there were rumors that he had been murdered by the order of the Habsburg court. His brother, Petar Zrinski (Peter IV), was noted for his role in the attempted Croatian-Hungarian rebellion of 1664-1670 which ultimately led to his execution for treason. His wife, Katarina Zrinska, died imprisoned for the same offence on 16 November 1673 in Graz. On 19 August 1691 the son of Nicholas VII, Adam Zrinski, fell at Battle of Slankamen while fighting against the Ottoman Empire. Parts of Međimurje remained in the hands of the Zrinski family until the end of the 17th century. The last male member of the family, Ivan Antun Zrinski (John IV), died in prison in 1703.

In 1715, during the period of Charles VI, Holy Roman Emperor, Count Michael Althan became the owner of Međimurje; he received the land for his loyal services. In 1720 the region was detached from Croatia and was included into the Zala County of the main part of the Habsburg Kingdom of Hungary. In 1738 Čakovec Castle was hit by an earthquake, which caused tremendous damage. The owners of the city made some repairs, but in 1741, fire caused additional damage. The castle started to decay.

The Church of St. Jerome was rebuilt in 1749 in Štrigova (Stridóvár) by the famous artist Ivan Ranger following the demolition of the original 15th century-built chapel by an earthquake in 1738.

Ignacije Szentmartony, a Jesuit from Kotoriba (Kottori), was a royal mathematician and astronomer in Lisbon and in 1754 an explorer of Brazil on behalf of the Portuguese government.

In 1791 Count György Festetics bought Međimurje, including Čakovec Castle and Feštetić Castle (Festetics kastély) in the neighboring village of Pribislavec (Zalaújvár), which remained in the property of Feštetić family until 1923.

On 19 April 1848 Josip Jelačić proclaimed a union of Croatian provinces, and their separation from the Kingdom of Hungary. By 1868, the former status quo was restored. Within the years 1860 to 1889 the railroad was introduced, while in 1893 electric power started illuminating most of the city streets. According to the 1910 census, the population of Međimurje numbered 90,387 people, including 82,829 Croats and 6,766 Hungarians.

The Magyarization between the 1870s-1910s introduced the concept of Međimurian language (muraközi nyelv). According to this view, the spoken language in Međimurje was not Croatian or Kajkavian, but Međimurian Slavic, which is a separate Slavic language-family. József Margitai was the main propagandist of the Međimurian language and he published few Međimurian books. The propagandists exploited idea that the Croatians are dissatisfied with the new Serbo-Croatian language.

Margitai propagated in Međimurian the usefulness of the assimilation in the Međimurje and the superiority of the Hungarian nation. The fake Međimurian literary language in fact was only little different from the Kajkavian literary language.

=== Modern history (after World War I) ===
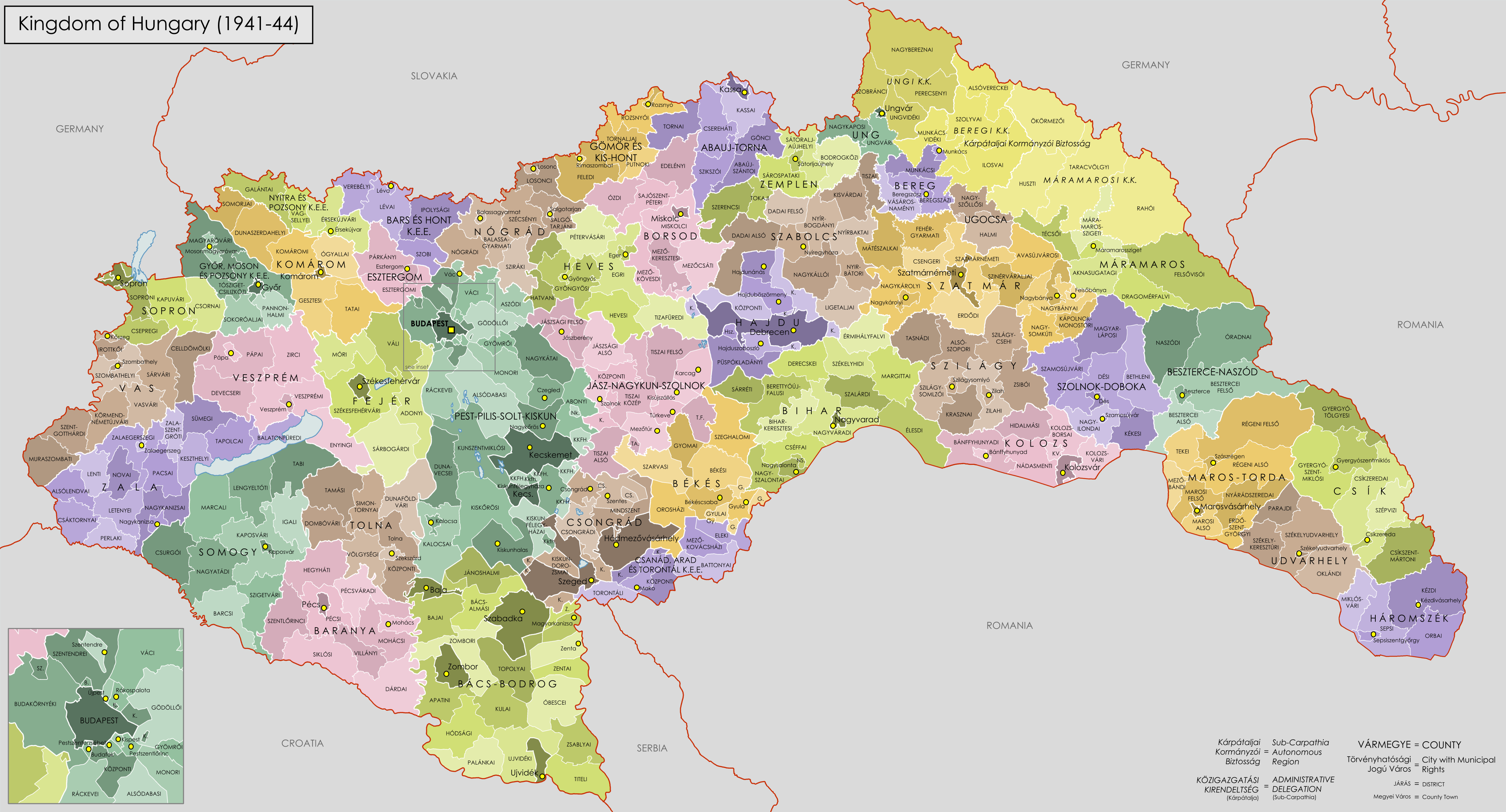
Administrative Map of the Kingdom of Hungary between 1941-1944

In 1918, after the collapse of the monarchic union of Austria-Hungary, and after the disarmament of the local police, the Međimurje region fell into civil disorder. The National Council of Slovenes, Croats and Serbs in Zagreb sent hastily assembled troops, which crossed the river Drava and reached Čakovec where they were defeated. In the second attempt to capture the region in late 1918, troops commanded by Slavko Kvaternik forced the Hungarian troops to abandon the region. On 9 January 1919, Međimurje joined to the newly created Kingdom of Serbs, Croats and Slovenes (later known as Yugoslavia).

In the Southern region, in the Slovene March (today the Prekmurje and Raba March near Szentgotthárd) there emerged independence-autonomy movements. József Klekl expressed the program of the autonomous (or independent) Slovene March. Oszkár Jászi, who supported the Slovene and Croatian minority, completed the program in a proposal: the Slovene March and the Međimurje should be merged. The program did not materialize.

Until 1922 the region was part of Varaždin County. From 1922 to 1929 the region was part of the Maribor Oblast, from 1929 to 1939 part of the Sava Banovina and from 1939 to 1941 part of the Banovina of Croatia.

Upon signing the Tripartite Pact on 25 March 1941, the Kingdom of Yugoslavia became a member of the Axis powers. In spite of this, after the coup Yugoslavia was invaded by Axis forces on 6 April 1941 and was subsequently occupied and partitioned. Between 1941 and 1945, Međimurje was occupied and annexed by Hungary. At this time some re-settlement of ethnic Croats who were settled in the region after 1918 occurred. Bulgarian troops within the Soviet 3rd Ukrainian Front captured the region in the spring of 1945, and the region became part of the socialist Croatia within restored Yugoslavia.

== Economy ==
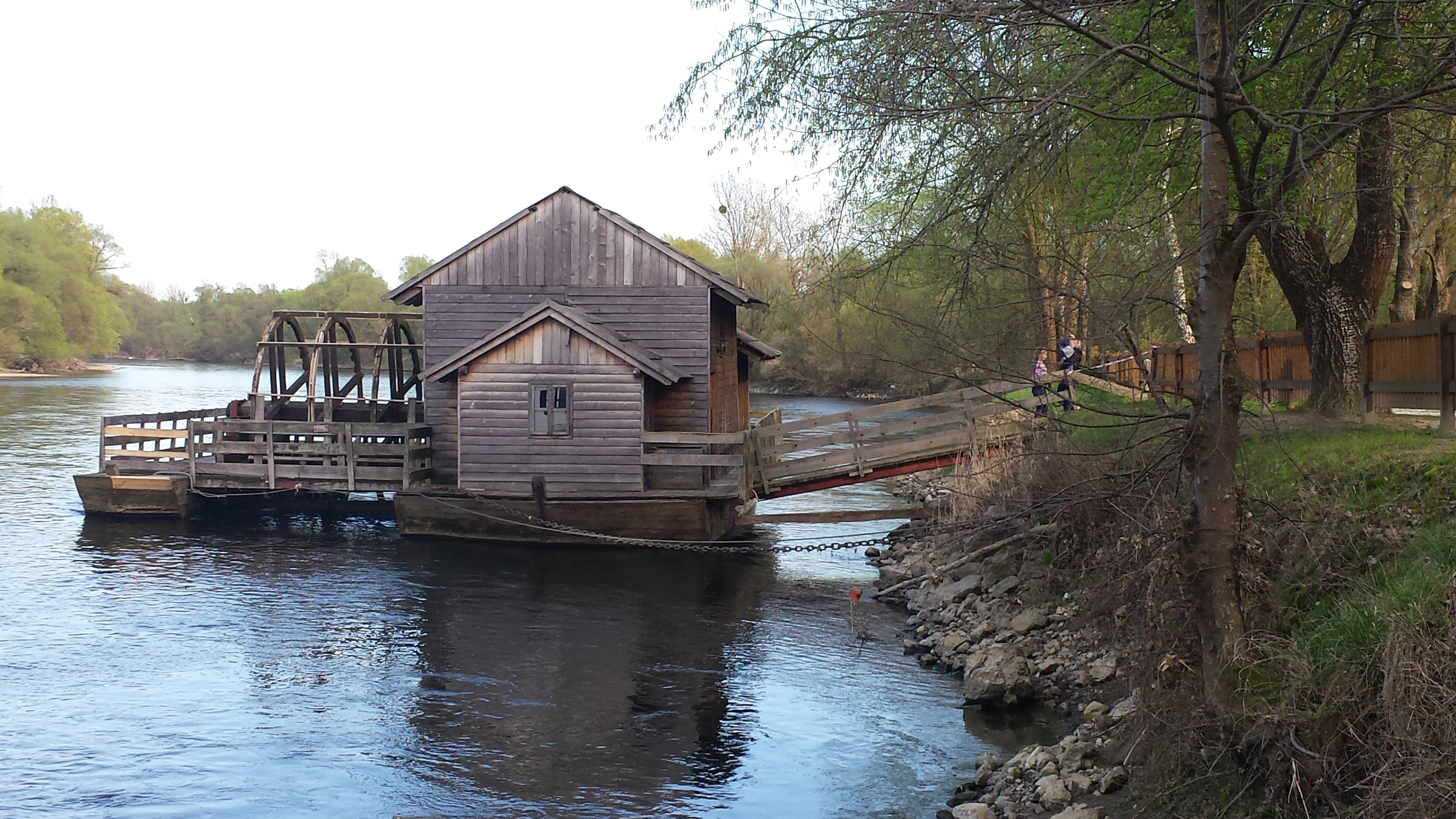
Watermill on the Mur river

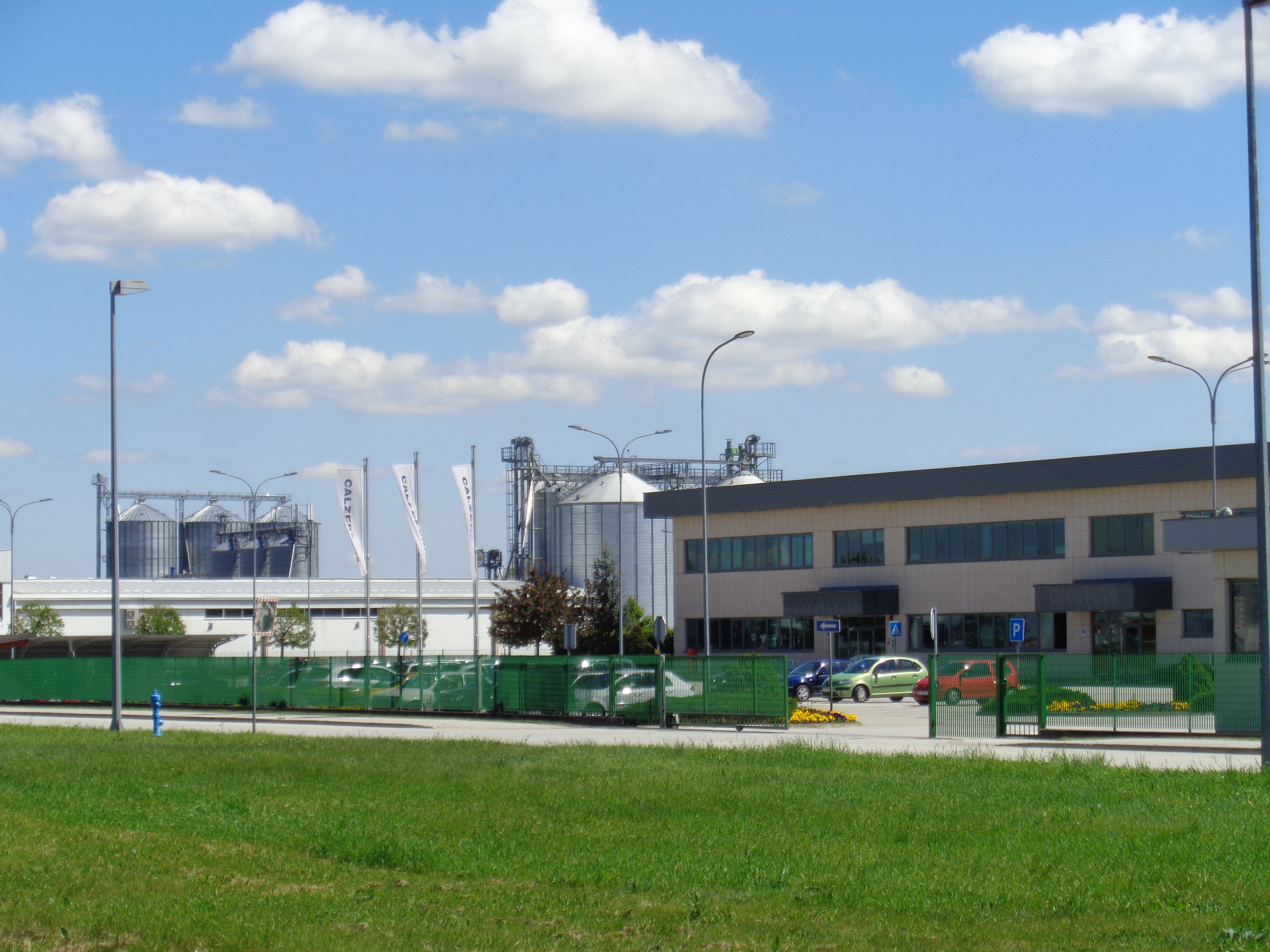
Čakovec-East industrial zone

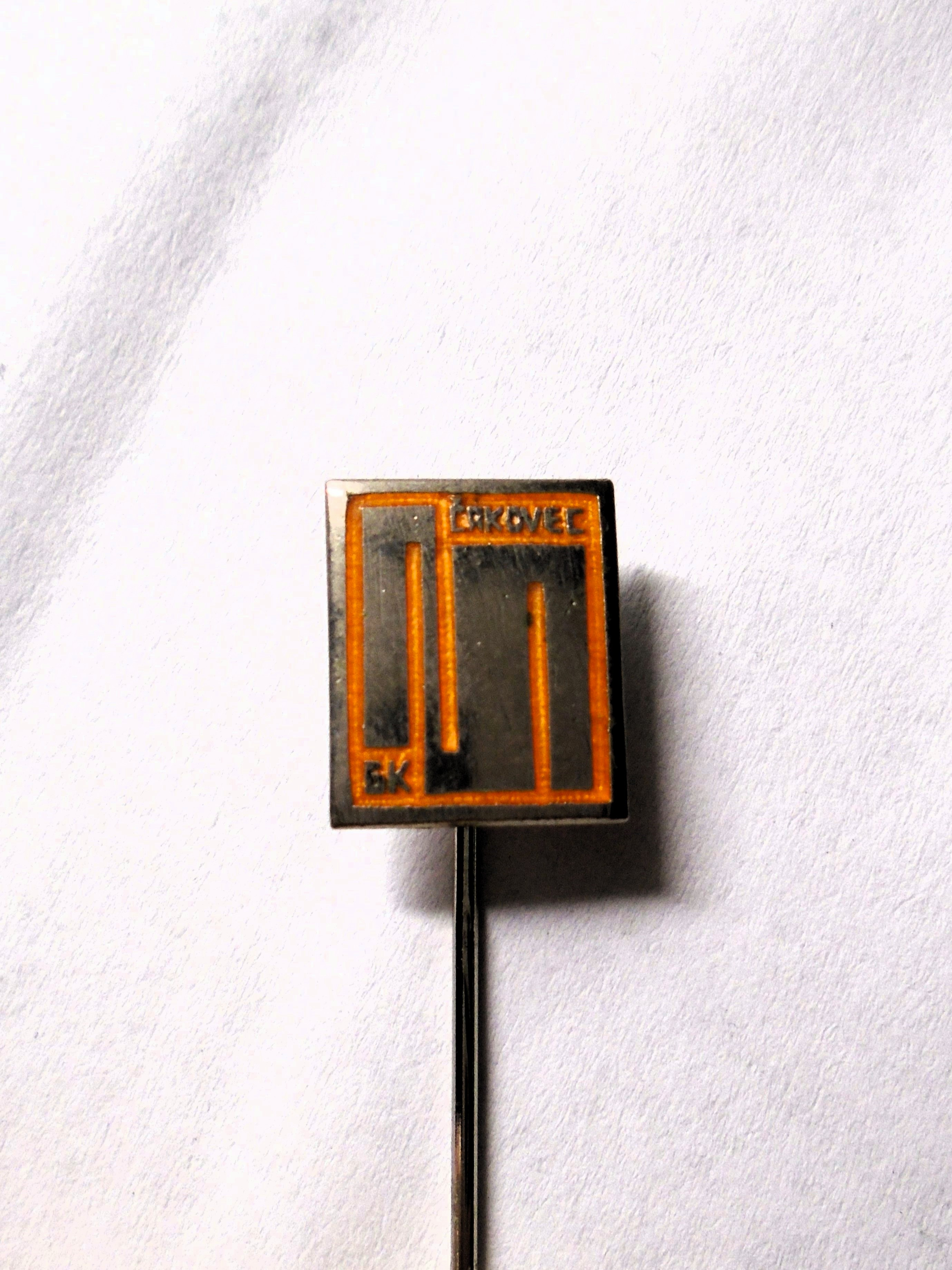
Old pin badge of the Građevni kombinat 'Međimurje', former construction company from Čakovec

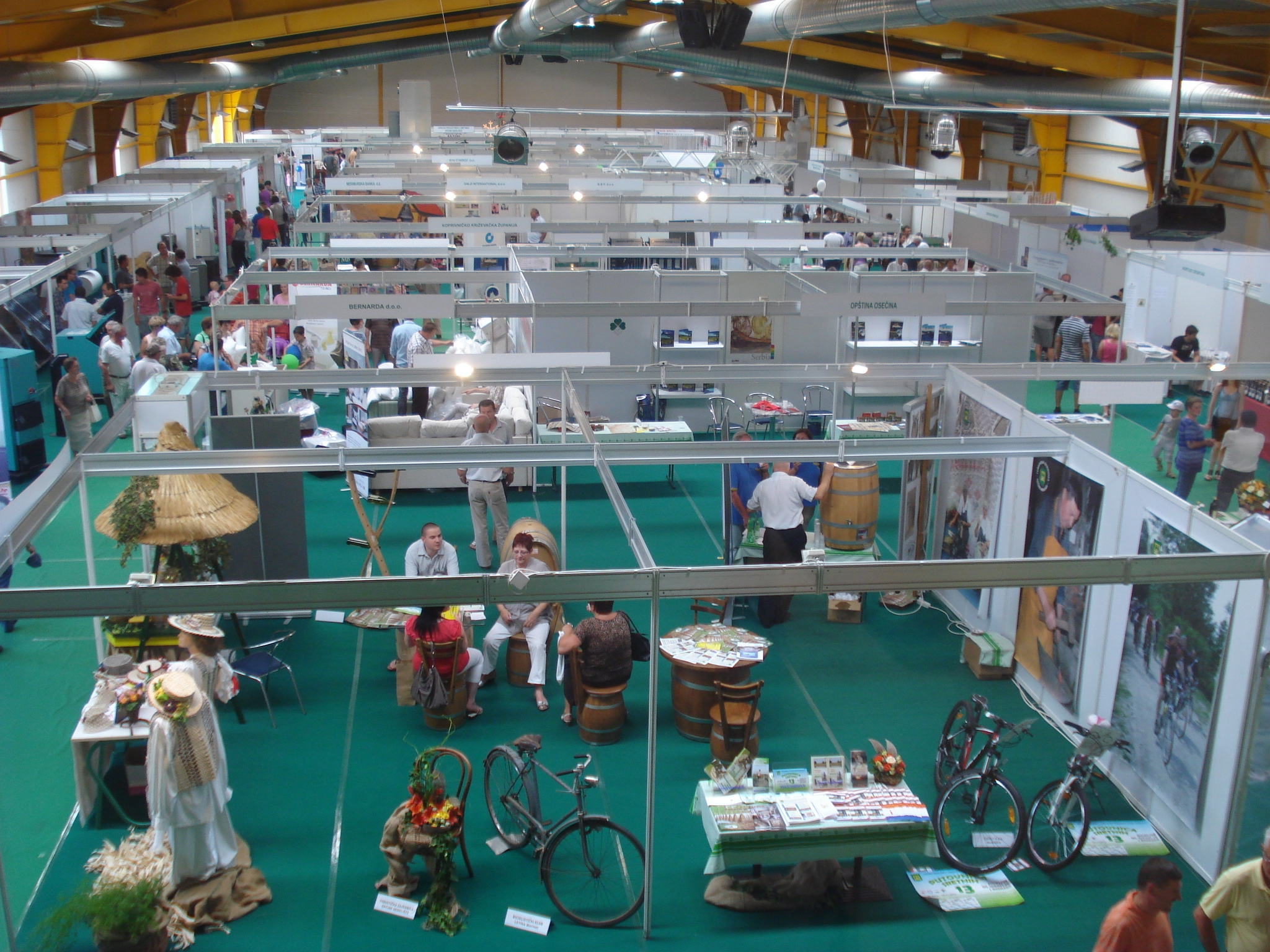
MESAP trade fair in Nedelišće

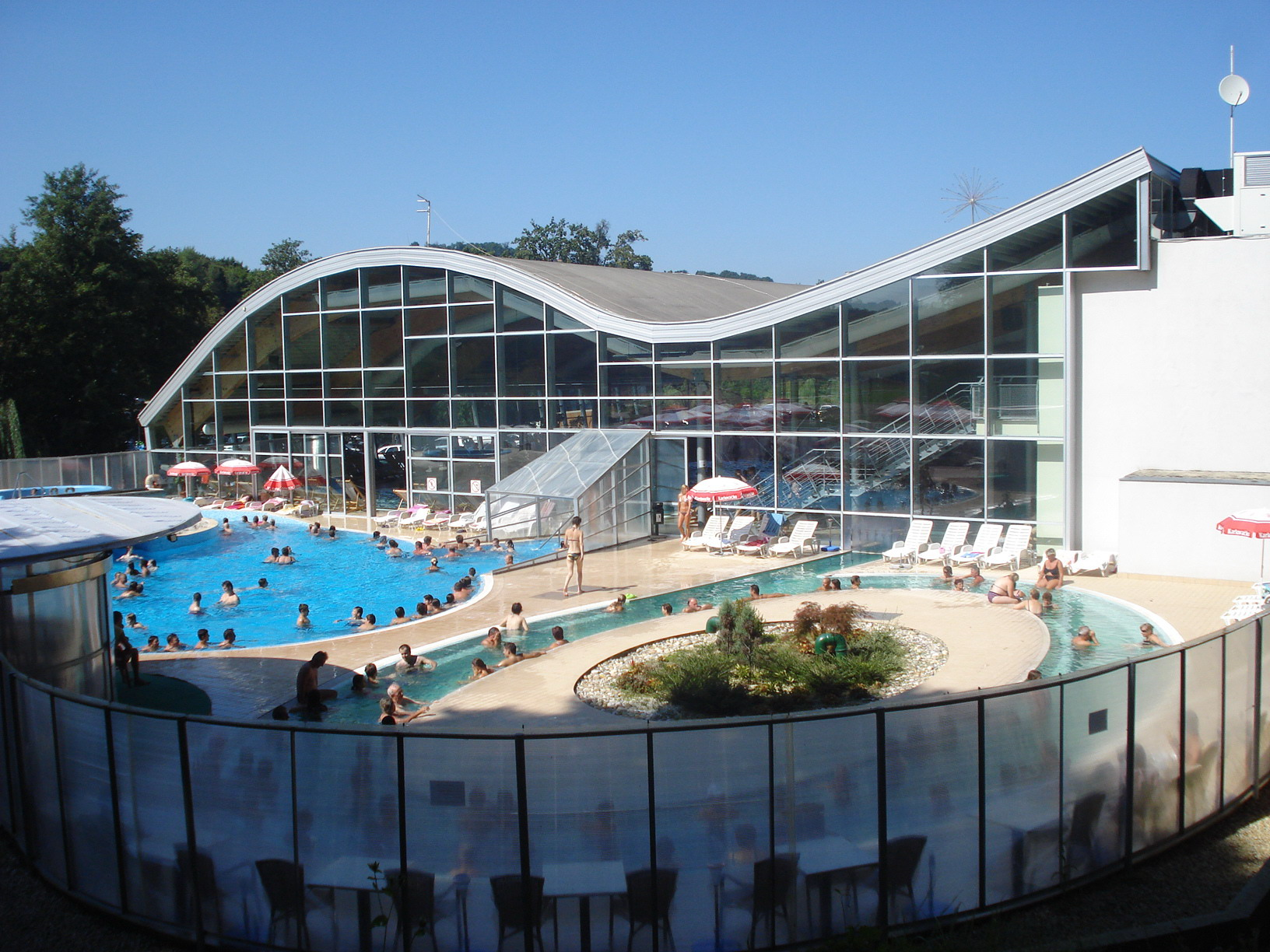
Vučkovec tourist resort near Sveti Martin na Muri

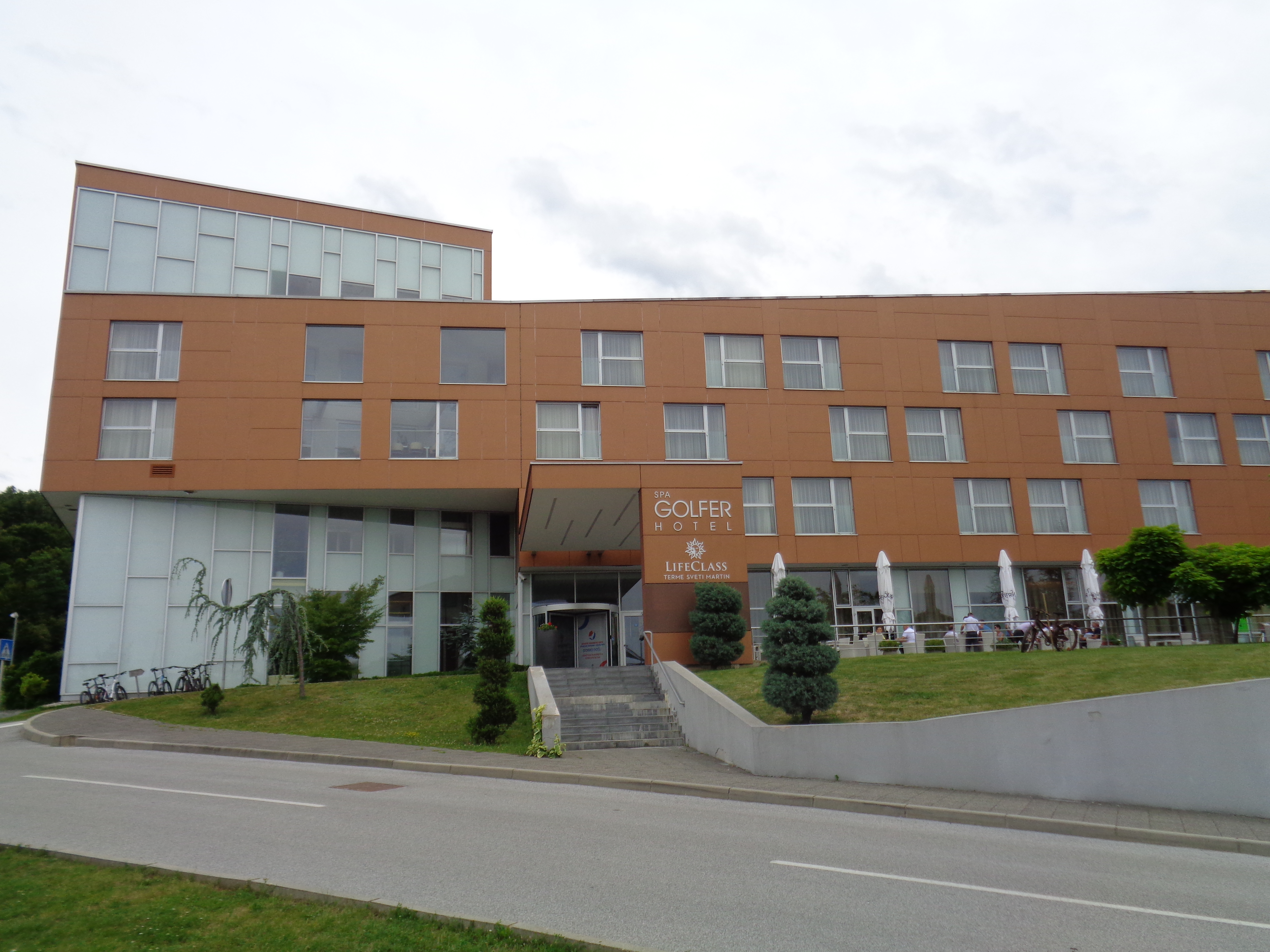
Golfer hotel in the Vučkovec tourist resort

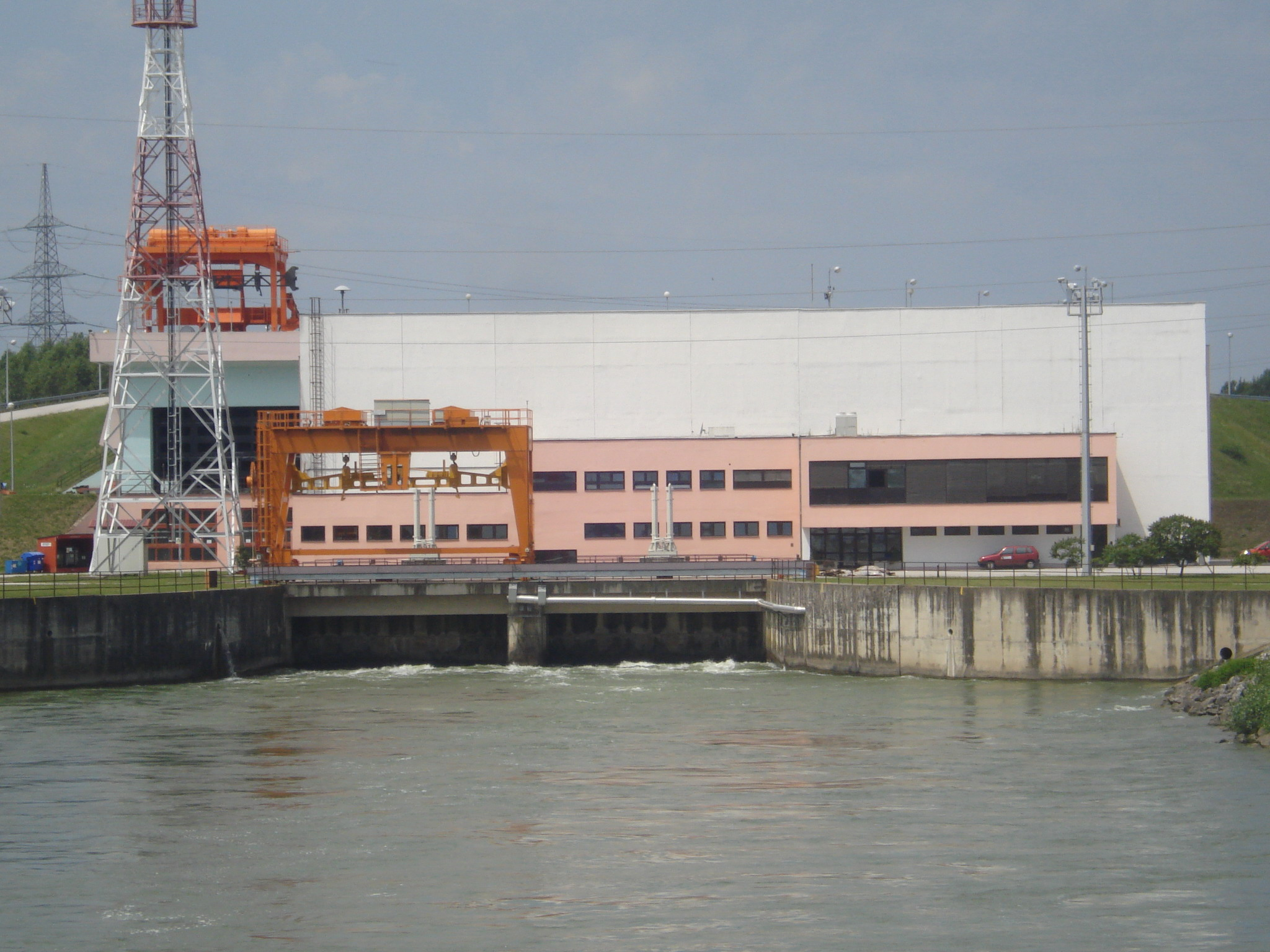
Dubrava Hydroelectric Power Plant

An estimated 22,000 people are employed in the county, with around 60% of them in bigger companies. Since the late 1960s and early 1970s, more than 17,000 people from the region have been employed abroad, in Austria, Germany, Switzerland, and beyond. The region is considered one of the nation's richest and most prosperous.

=== Manufacturing ===
Industry has mostly developed in and around Čakovec, as well as in the south-eastern parts of the county. Međimurska trikotaža Čakovec or MTČ was one of the most successful textile and clothing companies in northern Croatia for years. Some of the other well known clothing companies in the region include Čateks and the Mursko Središće-based Modeks. There are also some footwear companies based in the region, the most prominent of them being Jelen.

The Čakovec-based Zrinski is a printing and publishing company. Nedelišće was home to one of the first Croatian printing presses, operating there as early as 1570. The production of metal and PVC is significant in the region.

There are several construction companies based in the region. The largest of them, Građevni kombinat 'Međimurje', which employed over 8,000 workers, ceased to exist in 2010, but some of its parts survived, recovered, and continued to operate as independent companies. In recent years some of the largest local companies in these businesses include Ferro-Preis, TMT, Tehnix, Meplast, Muraplast, Tegra and Beton. Basket weaving is one of the oldest businesses in the region, with Međimurjeplet being the largest local company. Chairs, small items of furniture and other decorative items are also woven in addition to baskets. The most common weaving materials include twigs, rattan and bamboo.

=== Mining ===
There are deposits of coal around Mursko Središće, Peklenica and Lopatinec. Lopatinec got its name from lopata, the Croatian word for "shovel". Coal mining was part of the local economy between 1946 and 1972, but has eventually become unprofitable. The total output at that time was close to 4,600,000 tonnes. Estimated reserves are 200,000,000 tonnes, although new technologies and approaches would be needed to extract it profitably. The village of Križovec might be the only place in the world where people extract coal by pulling it by hand from the bottom of the river.

Gold can be found in the sands of both the Mura and Drava Rivers. In 1955, a geological survey calculated the concentration of gold in the Drava to be between 2.5 and 24.4 mg/m^{3}, occasionally reaching 111 to 150 mg/m^{3}. On the banks of Drava river near Donji Vidovec, one can still witness the process of gold prospecting as it used to be practiced during the gold rush. In historical times, Prelog was the center for distribution of rock salt for this part of the kingdom.

=== Oil and gas ===
The region was the first in Croatia where deposits of gas and crude oil were found, in 1856, around the villages of Selnica and Peklenica. The latter even got its name from pekel, the word for "hell" in the local Kajkavian dialect, since the people quickly noticed the peculiar properties of the dark, greasy liquid in small ponds appearing spontaneously on the ground. The reserves were initially calculated to be around 170,000 tonnes. There was exploitation from 1886 to 1889 and into the 20th century.

The first crude oil pipeline built in this part of Europe was between Mursko Središće and the nearby town of Selnica in 1901. At that time the annual production was less than 7,000 tons. Today, a modern pipeline stretches from Omišalj on the Adriatic island of Krk and Sisak toward the oil refinery in the Slovenian city of Lendava, not far from Mursko Središće. There are also gas deposits in Mihovljan, a suburban village on the northern outskirts of Čakovec.

=== Hydroelectric and geothermal resources ===
There are three hydroelectric power plants with dams and two reservoir lakes built on the Drava. The Varaždin Hydroelectric Power plant fed from Lake Ormož, Čakovec Hydroelectric Power Plant is fed from the smaller Lake Varaždin and opened in 1982, while the Dubrava Hydroelectric Power Plant is fed from the larger Lake Dubrava and opened in 1989. The latter two hydroelectric power plants provide 161,6 MW of electric power. Their dams, levees, canals and reservoirs are also used for flood control and irrigation.

The extraction of gravel is also significant for the region. There is currently around 10 gravel pits, located in the southern and eastern parts of the region. During the 1990s, some of the gravel pits also became popular bathing and entertainment resorts during the summers, with restaurants and sports grounds built around them. Nowadays, the Totomore resort near the village of Totovec is the most notable resort of this kind, while a couple of other similar resorts closed during the early 2000s.

Geothermal resources also exist in the region, although they cannot be considered a profitable energy source. Instead, they are used for leisure and recreation.

== Awards ==
- Međimurje was named a Green Destinations region at the ITB Berlin fair.

== Gallery ==
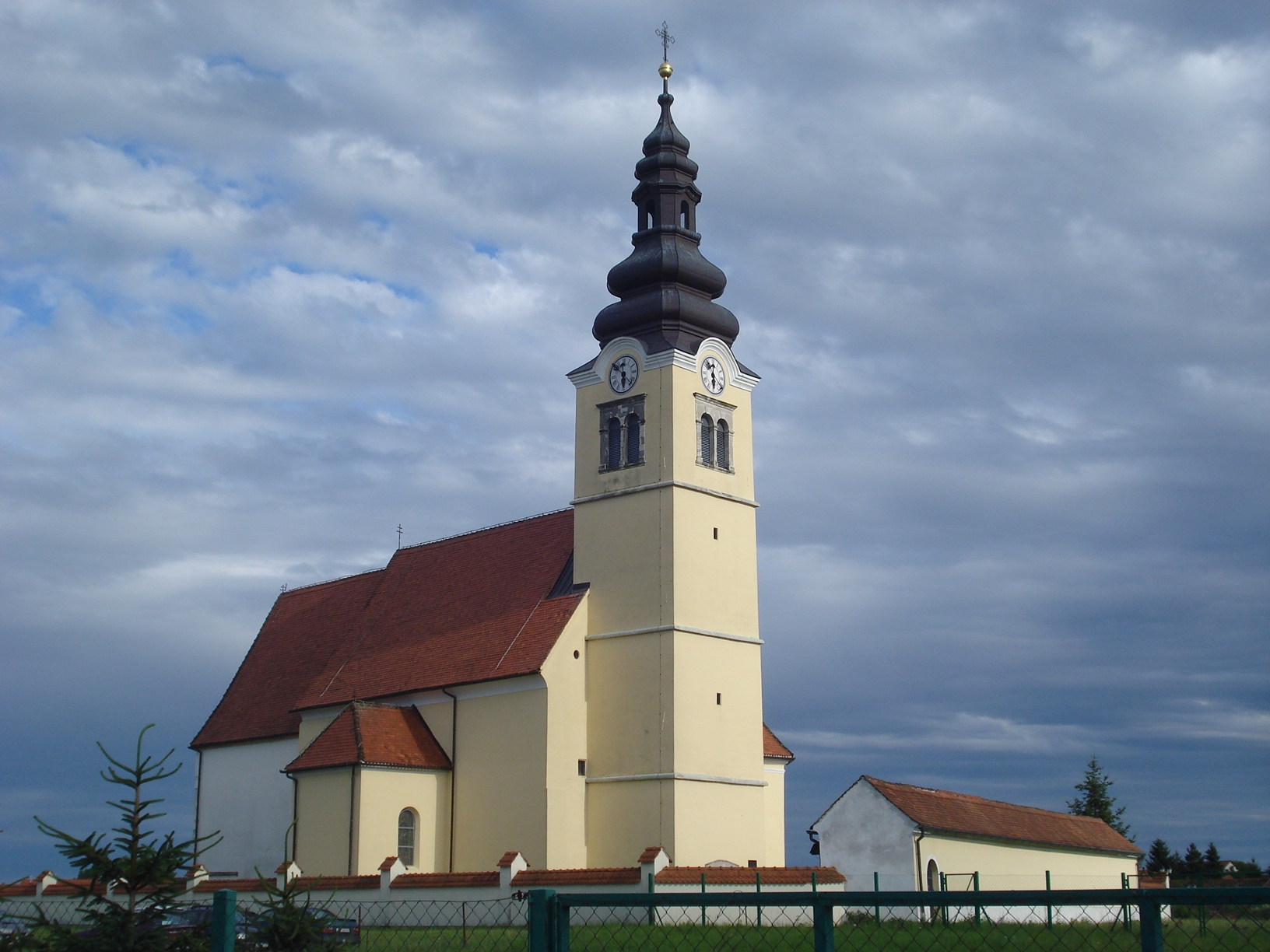
Nedelišće

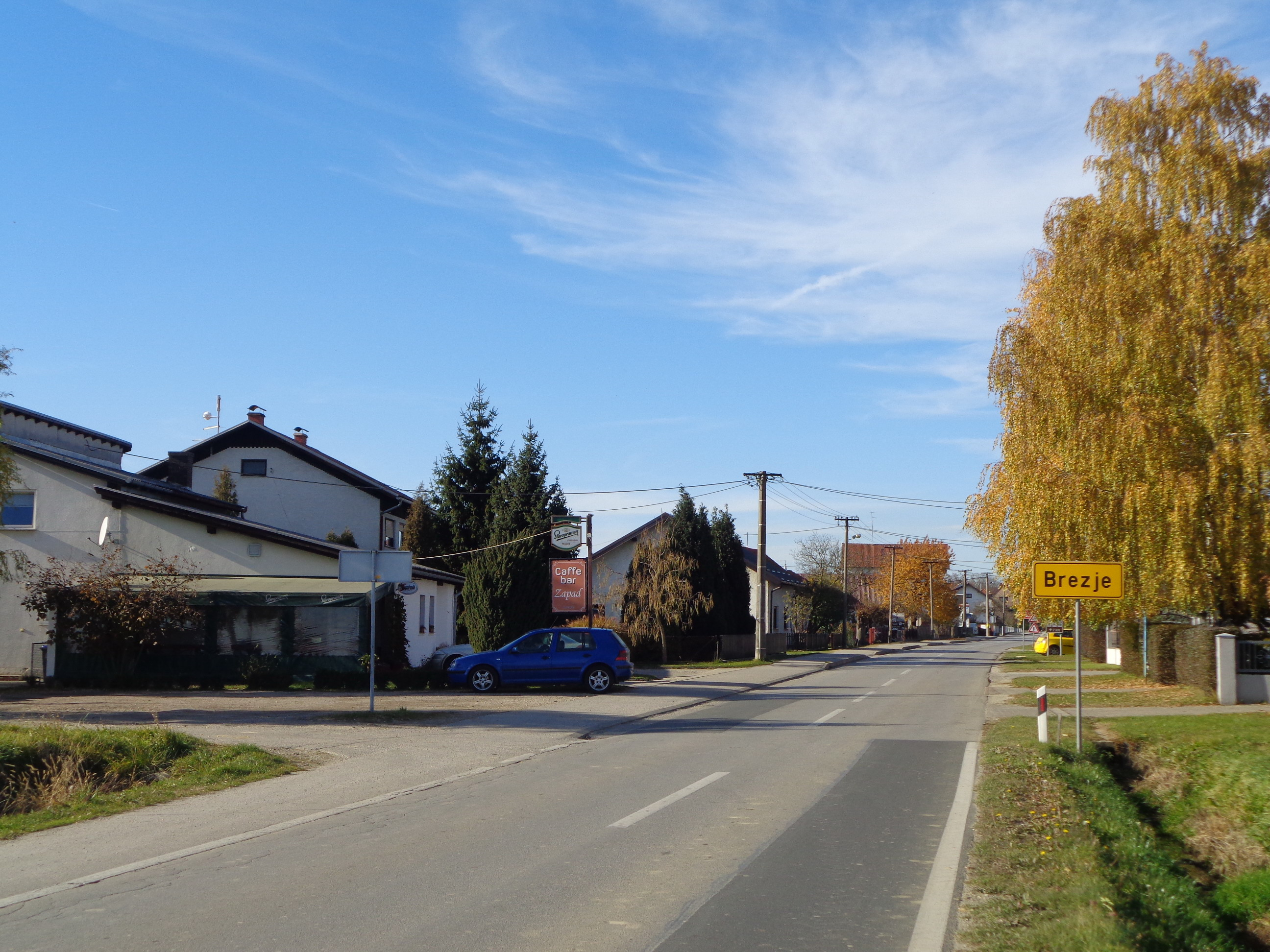
Brezje

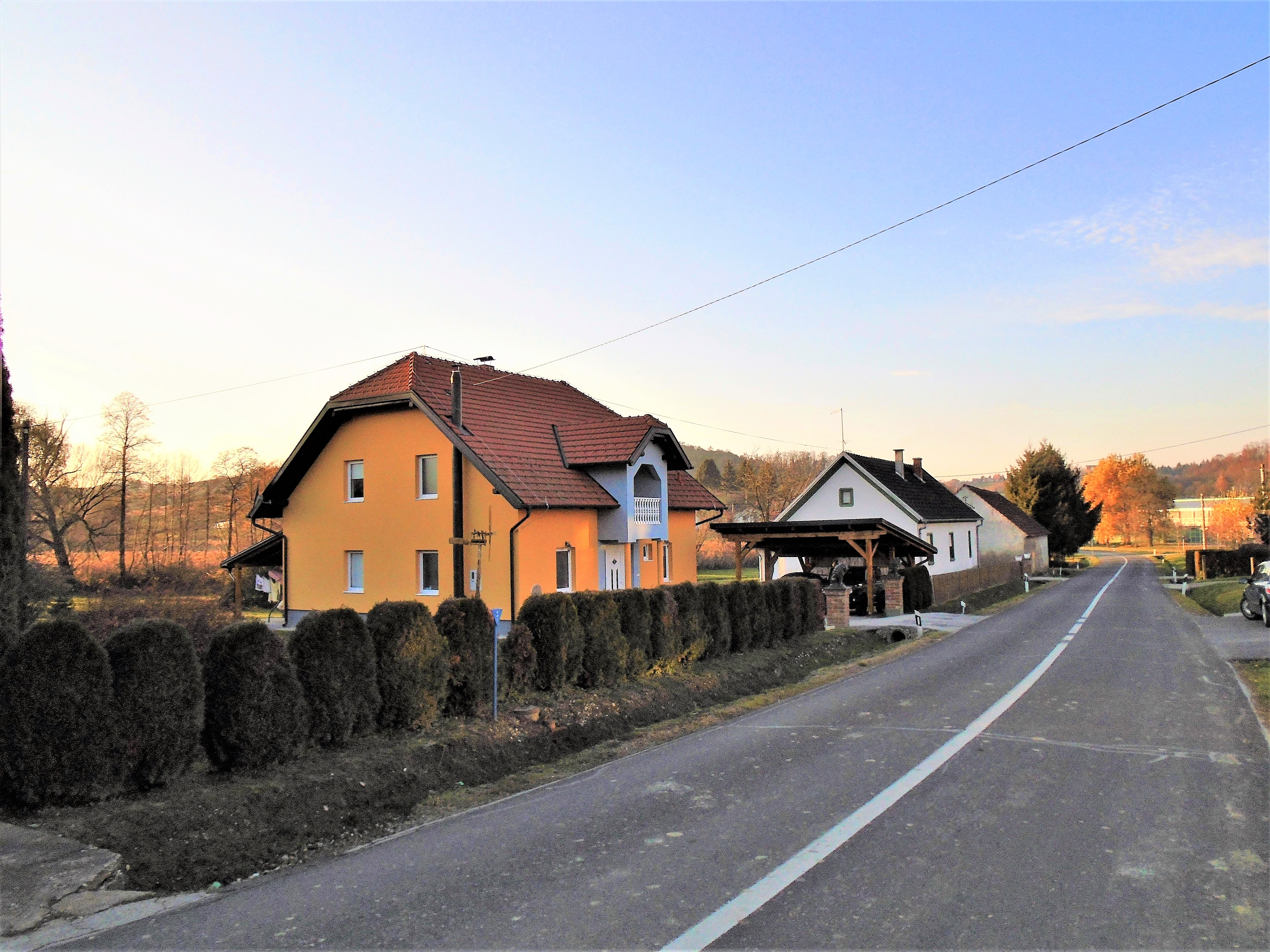
Štrigova

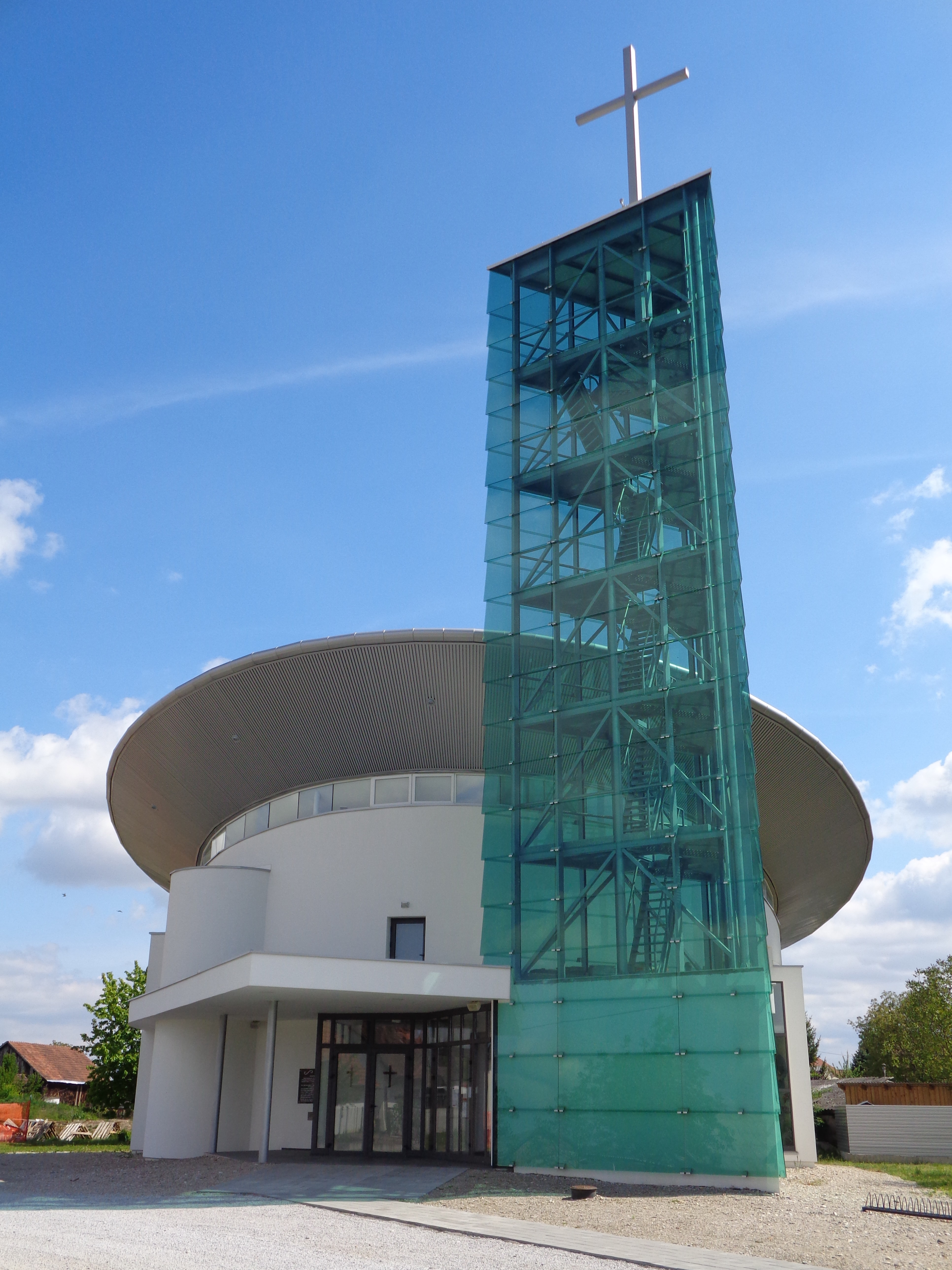
Strahoninec

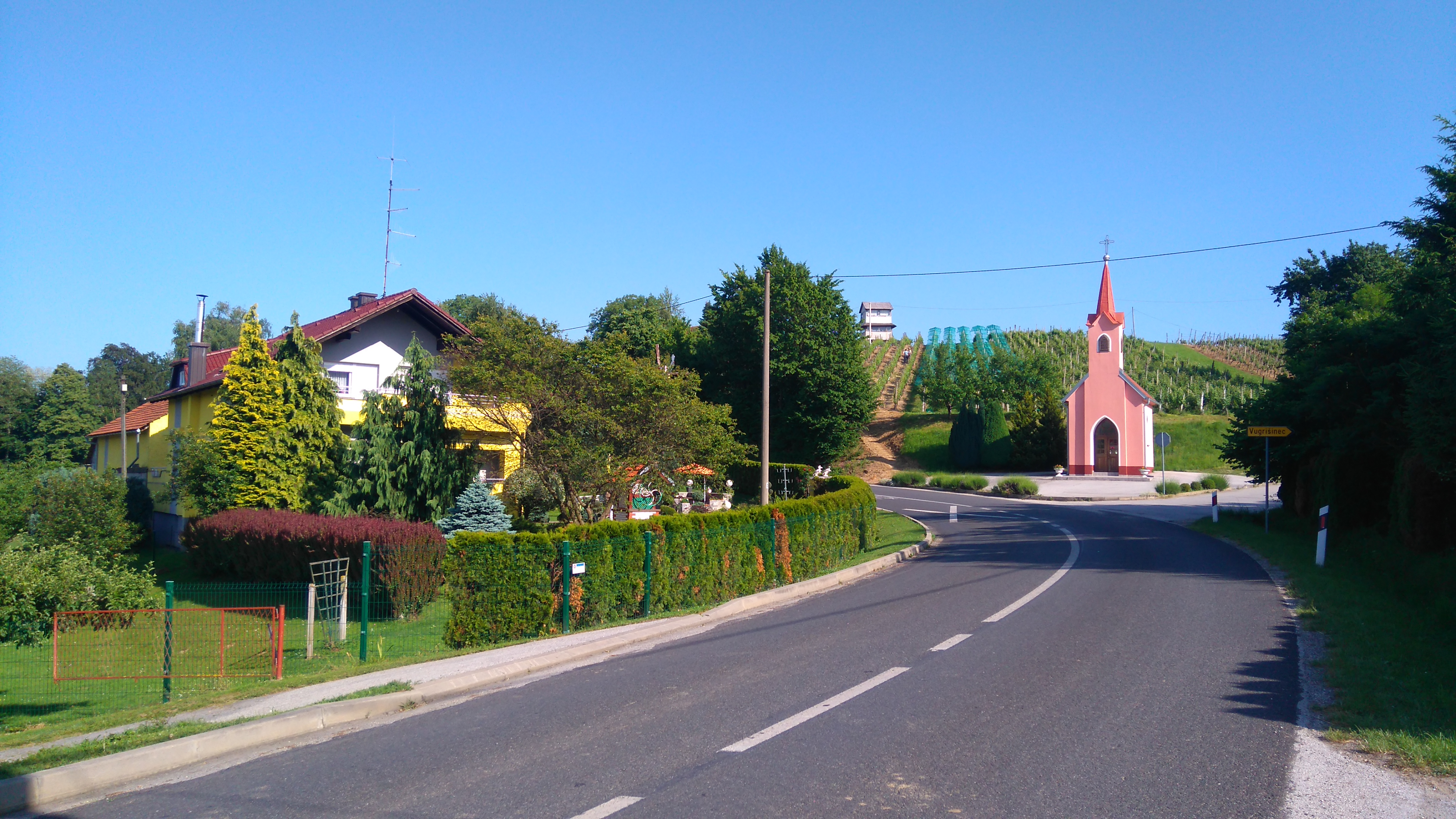
Prekopa

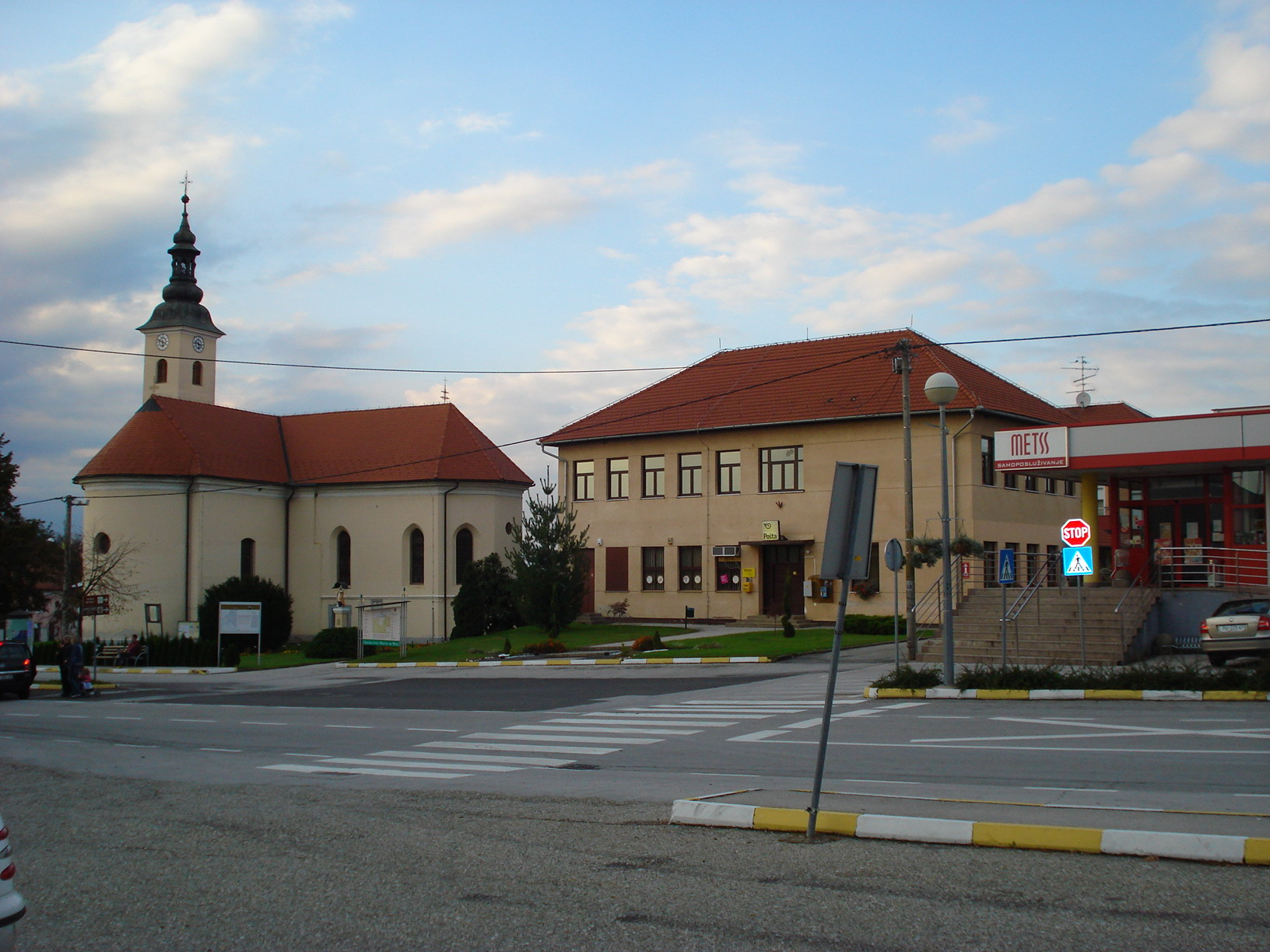
Sveti Martin na Muri

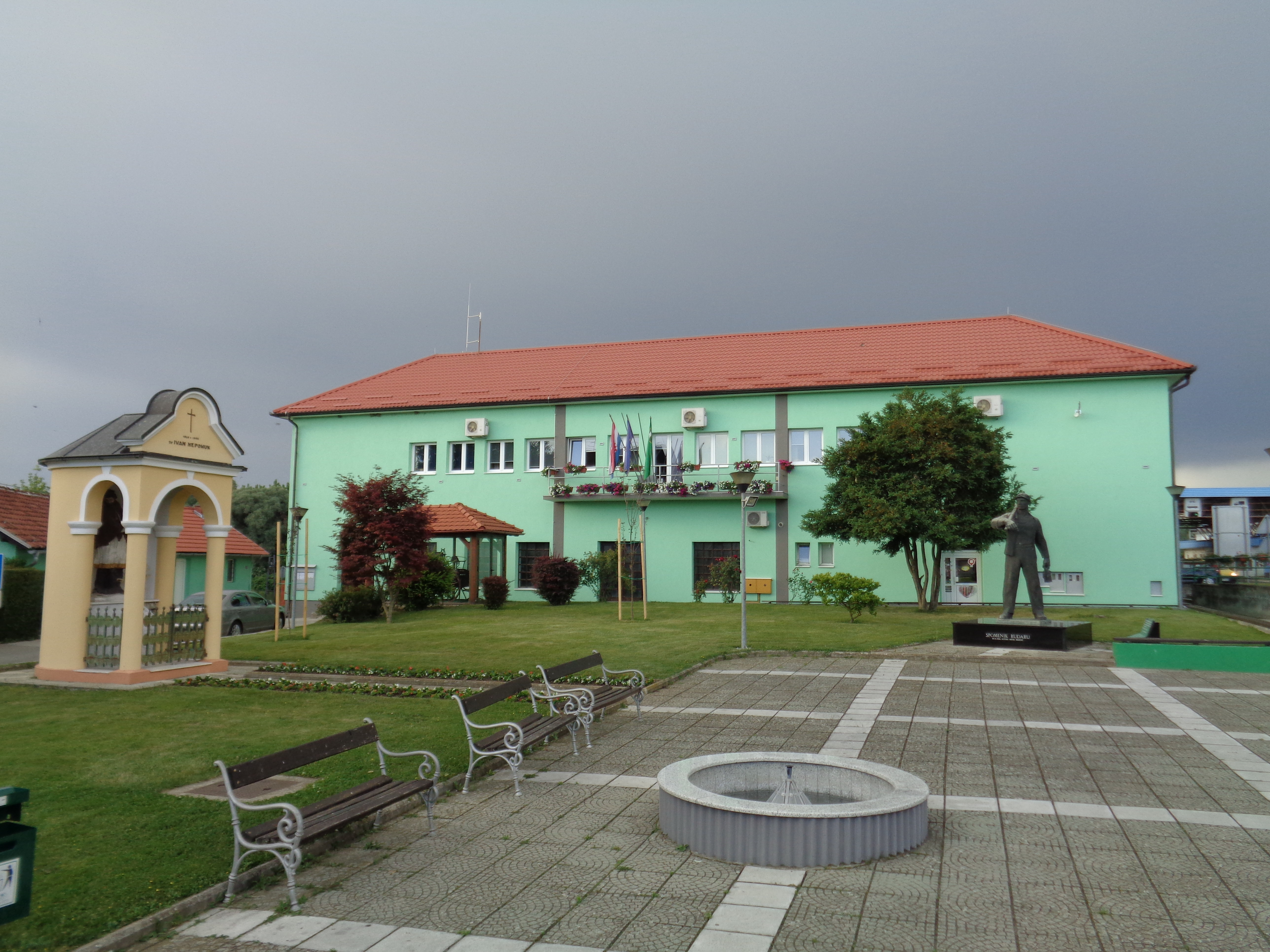
Mursko Središće

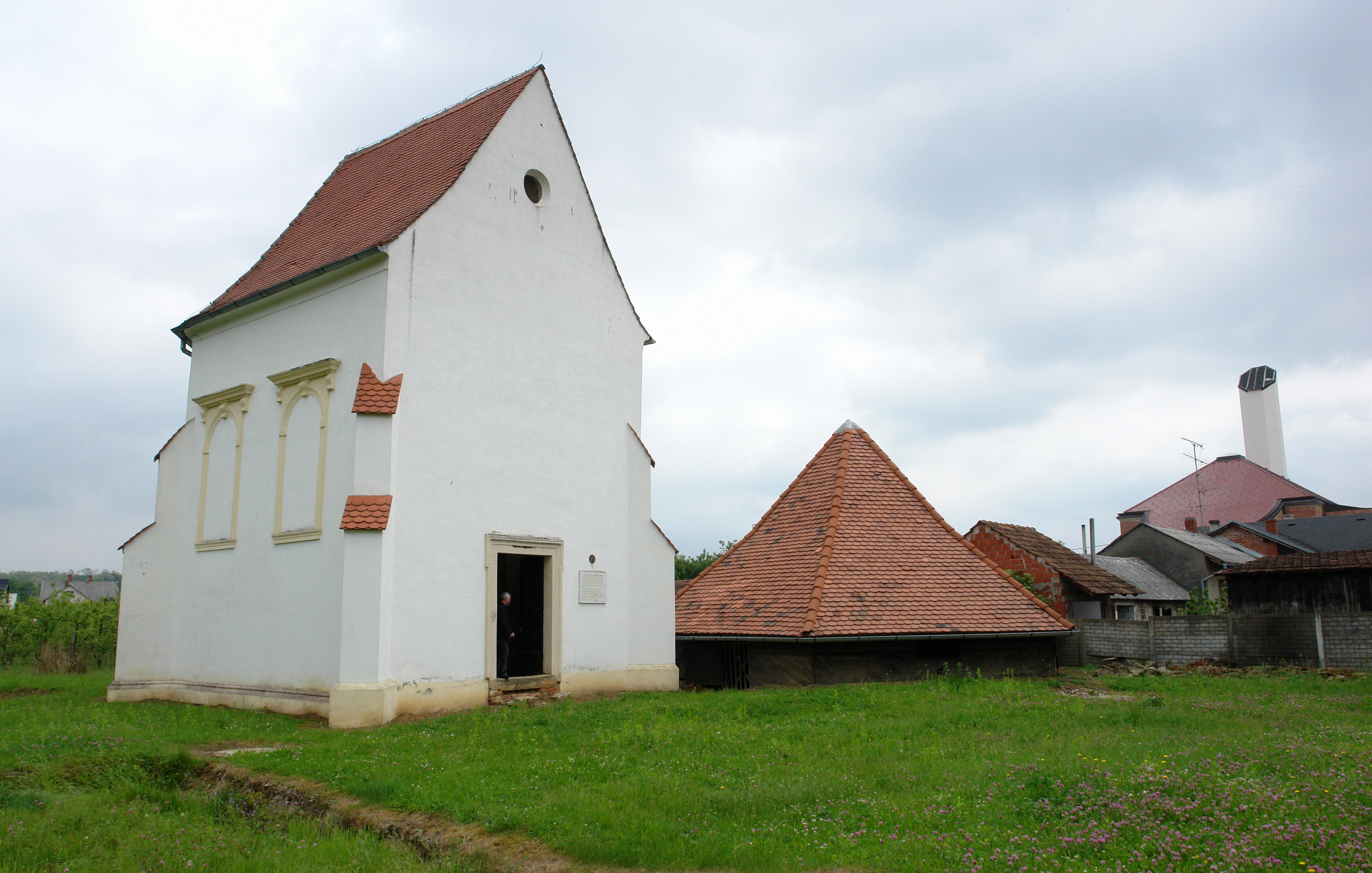
Šenkovec

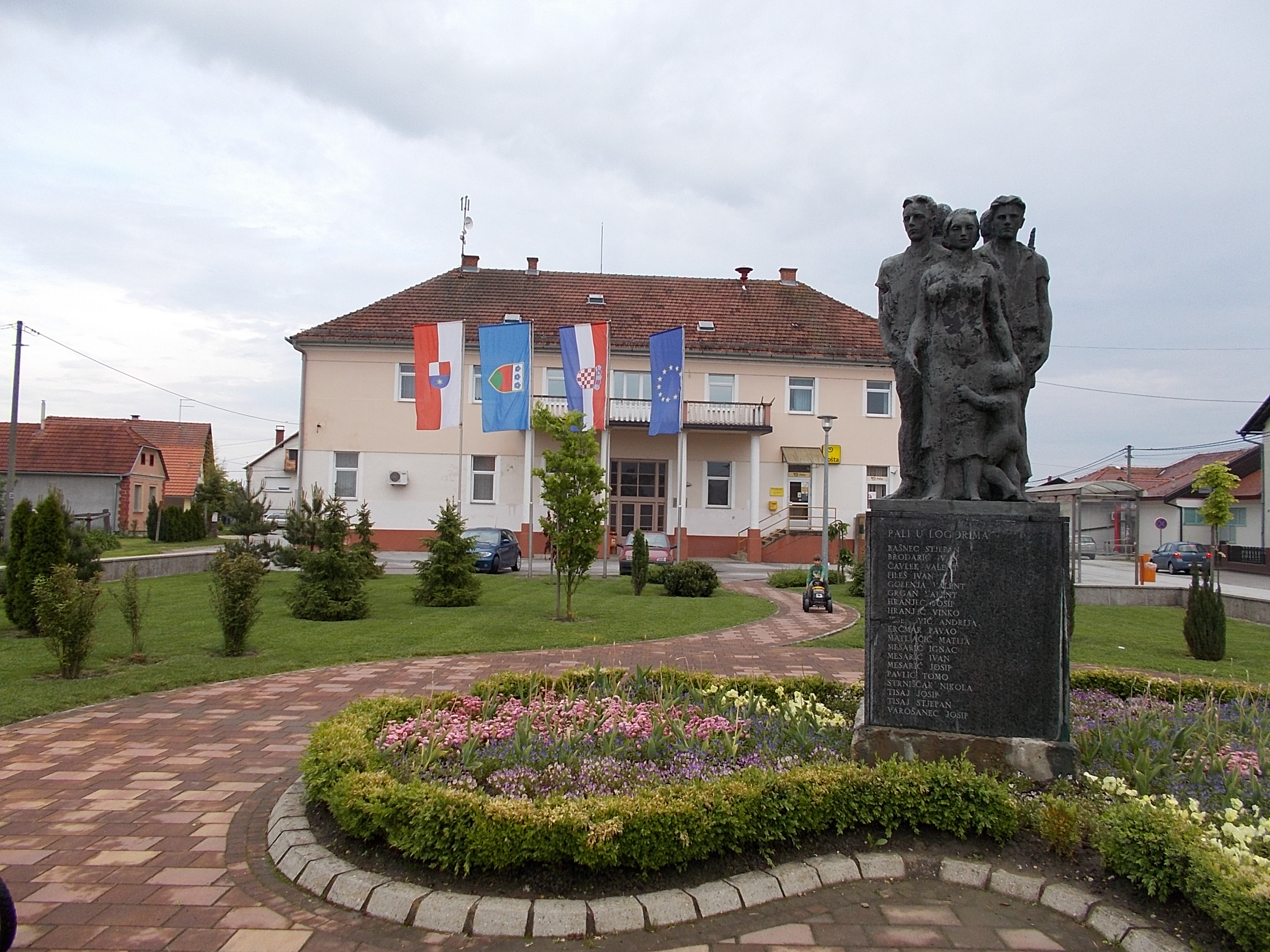
Goričan

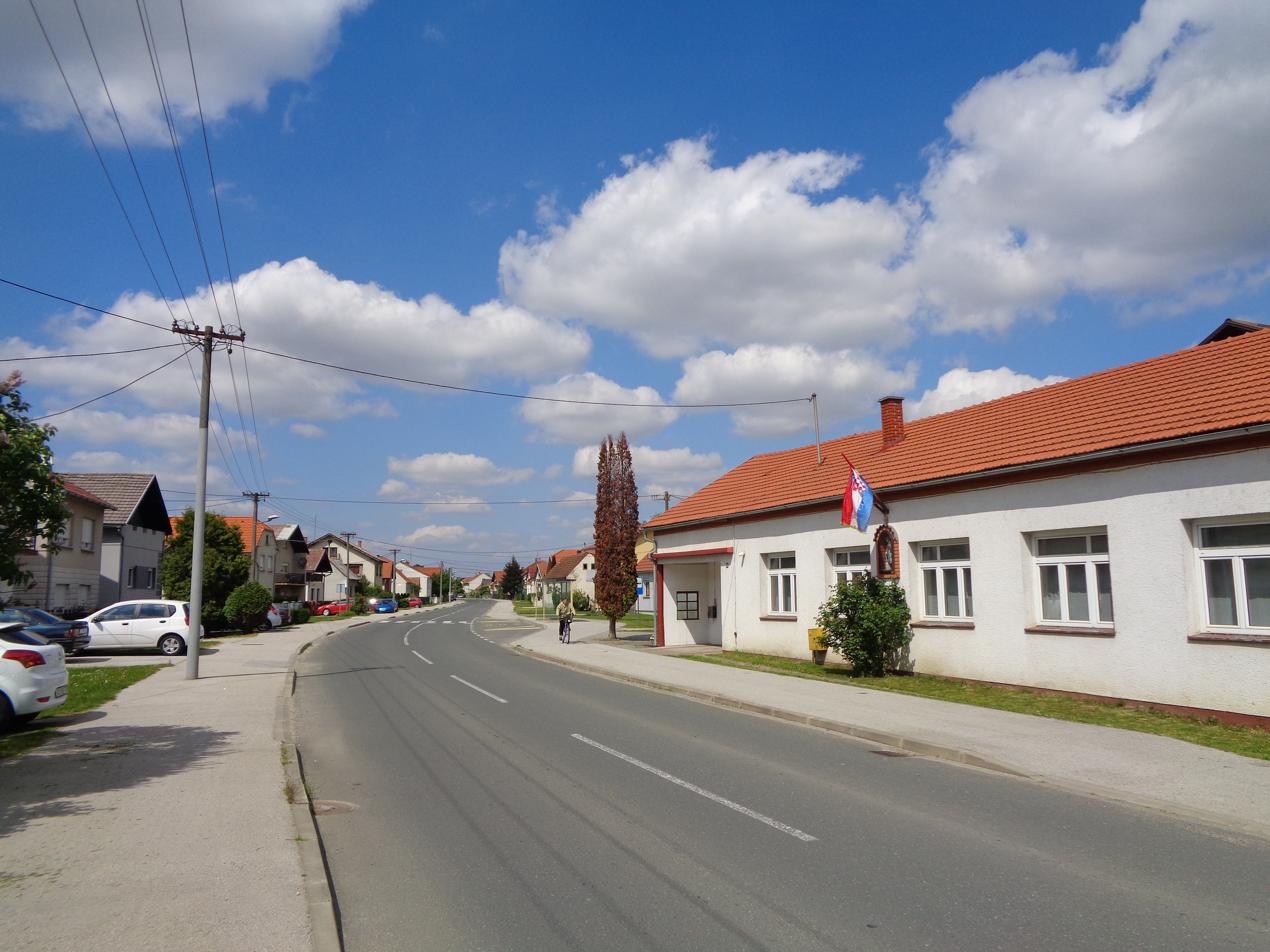
Savska Ves

== Notable people ==
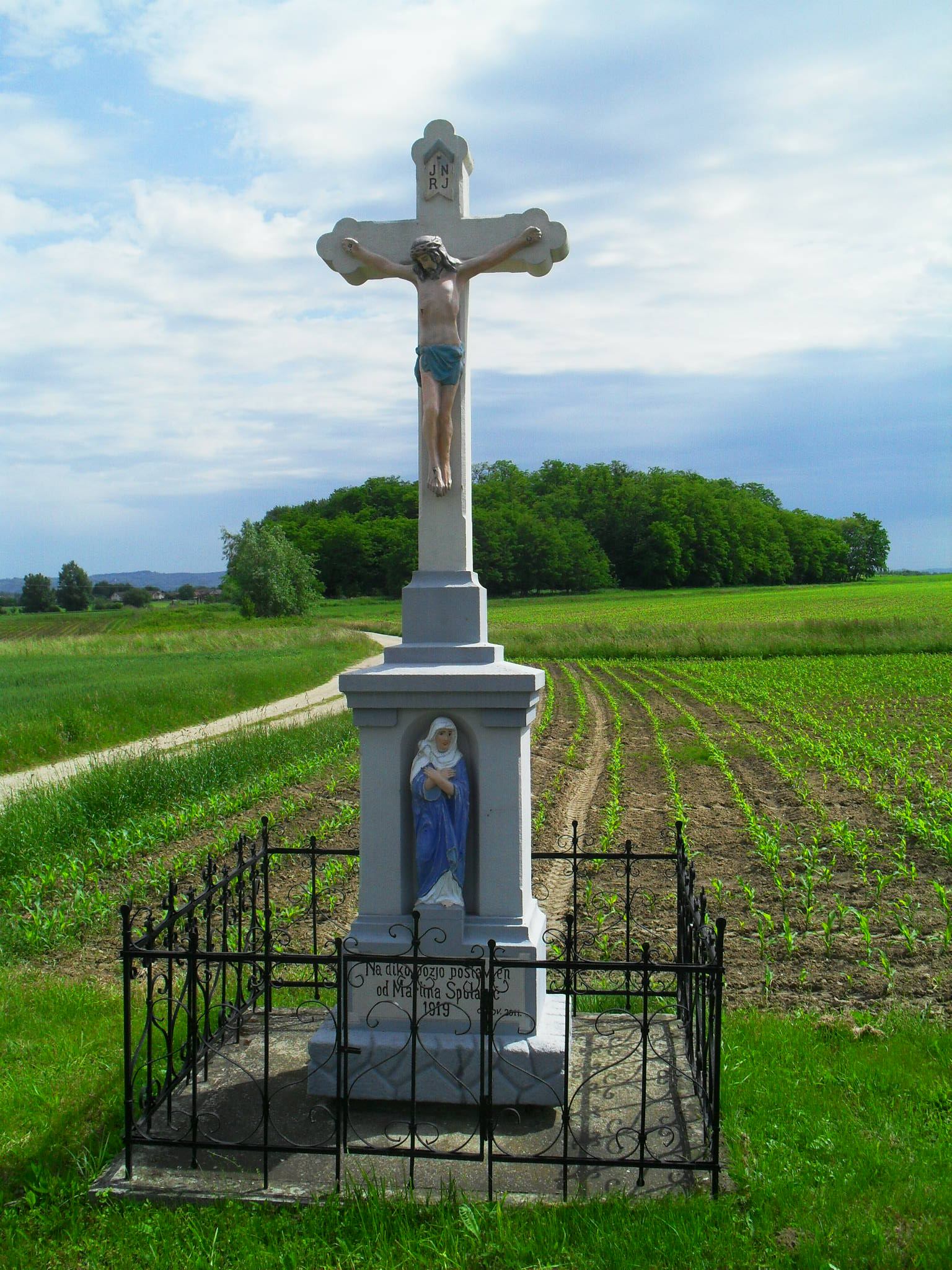
Shrine near Selnica with Kajkavian inscriptions

- Lidija Bajuk - musician, entertainer
- Lujo Bezeredi - sculptor
- Joža Horvat - adventurer, writer
- Robert Jarni - football player and manager
- Ladislav Kralj-Međimurec - painter
- Dražen Ladić - football player (goalkeeper) and manager
- Franjo Punčec - tennis player
- Ivan Ranger - painter
- Rudolf Steiner - philosopher, thinker
- Ignacije Szentmartony - explorer
- Josip Štolcer-Slavenski - composer
- Nikola Zrinski - soldier, poet, philosopher
- Petar Zrinski - soldier
- Vinko Žganec - folklorist, ethnomusicologist
