= Feštetić =

Feštetić may refer to:

== People ==
- Feštetić family, a Croatian and Hungarian noble family originating in Croatia
- Imre Festetics (1764–1847), a Hungarian nobleman and geneticist
- Leo Festetics (1800–1884), Hungarian composer
- György Festetics (1815–1883), Hungarian politician
- Marie Festetics (1839–1923), Austro-Hungarian countess
- Andor Festetics (1843–1930), Austro-Hungarian politician
- Tasziló Festetics (1850–1933), Austro-Hungarian nobleman and politician
- Count Sándor Festetics (1882–1956), Hungarian politician
- Antal Festetics (born 1937), Austrian biologist

== Places ==
- Feštetić Castle, in Pribislavec, a village at Čakovec, northern Croatia
- Festetics Palace, in Keszthely, Zala, Hungary

== Other uses ==
- Festetics String Quartet, a musical ensemble from Budapest, Hungary
