= Lady Mary Douglas-Hamilton =

Princess of Monaco (1850–1922)

Lady Mary Victoria Douglas-Hamilton
- Hereditary Princess of Monaco
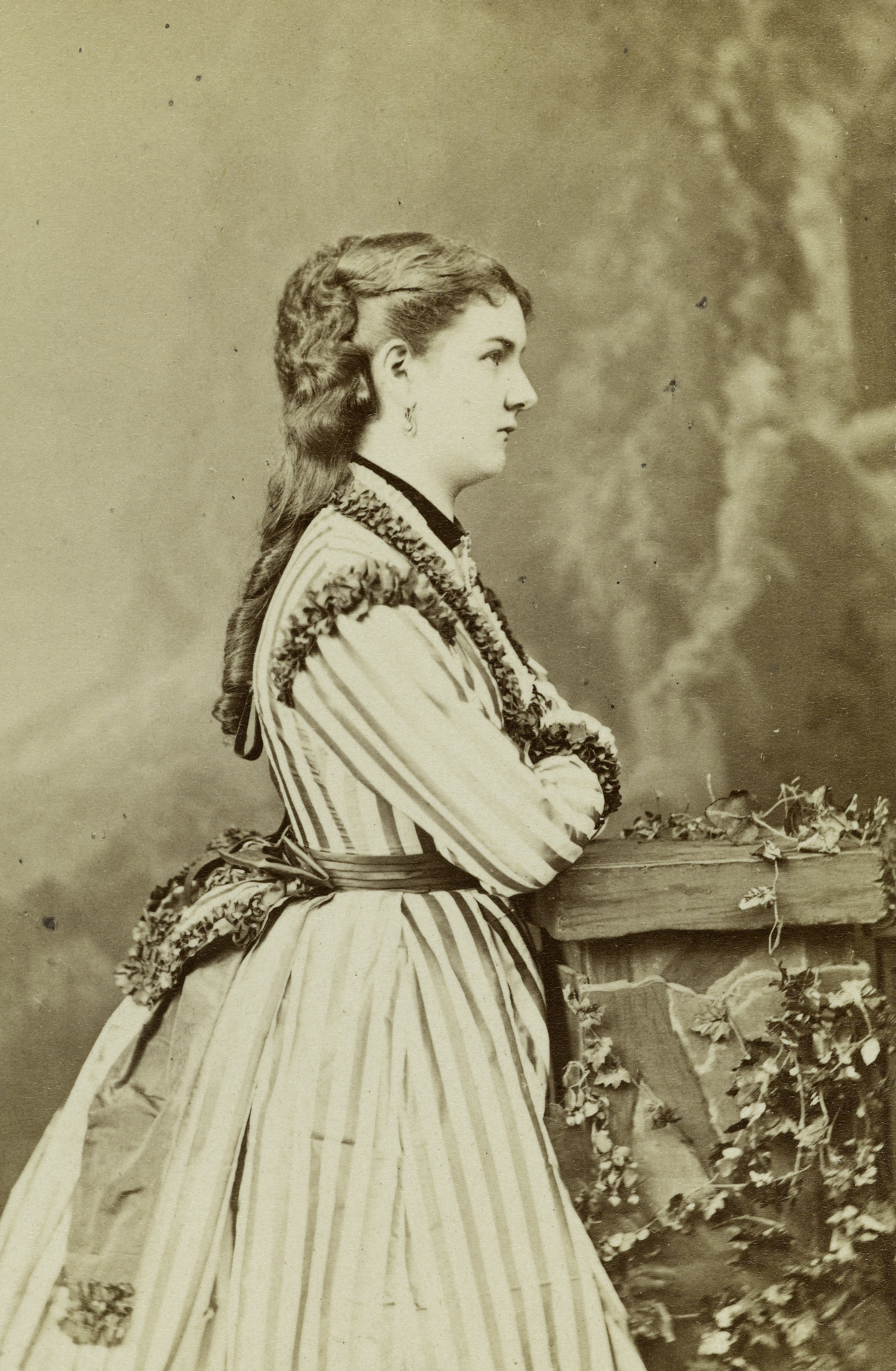
- Born: Lady Mary Victoria Douglas-Hamilton; 11 December 1850; Hamilton Palace, Scotland
- Died: 14 May 1922 (aged 71); Budapest, Hungary
- Burial: Festetics Mausoleum
- Spouse: Albert, Hereditary Prince of Monaco (later Albert I) (m. 1869; ann. 1880) Tassilo Festetics von Tolna (m. 1880)
- Issue: Louis II, Prince of Monaco; Countess Mária Matild Festetics de Tolna; Prince György Tasziló Festetics de Tolna; Countess Alexandra Olga Festetics de Tolna; Countess Karola Friderika Festetics de Tolna
- House: Hamilton
- Father: The 11th Duke of Hamilton
- Mother: Princess Marie Amelie of Baden

Lady Mary Victoria Douglas-Hamilton (11 December 1850 – 14 May 1922), was a Scottish noblewoman who was the Hereditary Princess of Monaco by marriage to Albert, Hereditary Prince of Monaco.

== Life ==
Lady Mary was born as the youngest child and the only daughter of the 11th Duke of Hamilton and of his wife, Princess Marie Amelie of Baden.

=== Hereditary Princess of Monaco ===
Lady Mary's first marriage, on 21 September 1869 at Château de Marchais, was to Prince Albert, only child and heir apparent of Charles III, Prince of Monaco. The marriage was arranged upon the wish of the Monegasque princely house, as it had long been an ambition of his mother and grandmother to marry him to a member of the British royal house. While Queen Victoria refused a match between Albert and one of her closer family members, Lady Mary was suggested as a suitable replacement. However, Lady Mary and Albert's marriage was annulled on 3 January 1880 and civilly dissolved on 28 July 1880 by order of Charles III. Lady Mary supposedly hated the heat of the Mediterranean area.

Lady Mary and Albert had a single son, Louis, who would take the throne of Monaco with the regnal name Louis II upon his father's death. Via Louis II, Lady Mary is the great-great-grandmother of the current Sovereign Prince of Monaco, Albert II.

=== Life in Hungary ===
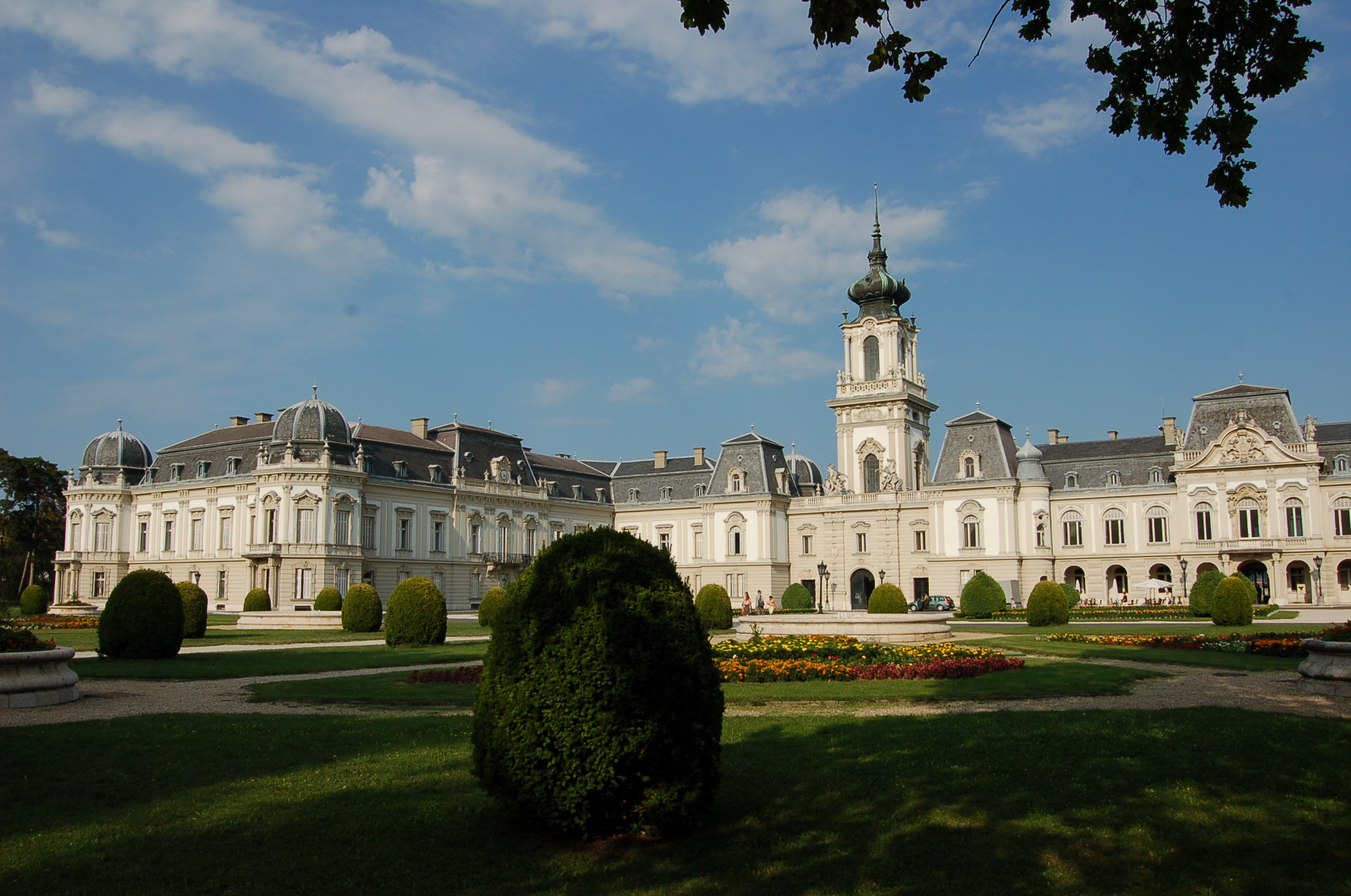
Festetics Palace, the main residence of the Festetics family in Keszthely, Hungary

Lady Mary's second marriage, on 2 June 1880, was to Count Tassilo Festetics de Tolna. The couple had four children, Countess Mária Matild Georgina (1881–1953), who married Prince Karl Emil von Fürstenberg; Prince György (1882–1941); Countess Alexandra Olga Eugénia (1884–1963), who married Prince Karl von Windisch-Graetz; and Countess Karola Friderika Mária (1888—1951), who married Oskar Gautsch Freiherr von Frankenthurn.

During her 40-year marriage to Count, later Prince, Tassilo Festetics de Tolna, Lady Mary oversaw the enlargement and improvement of the main family seat, Festetics Palace, and its gardens, in Keszthely, western Hungary.

On numerous occasions, she and her husband entertained her brother the Duke of Hamilton and his great friend the Prince of Wales. There are still portraits hanging in the Palace of numerous members of her family, including one of her father in full Highland dress. Outside the palace, on either side of the main entrance, there are the armorial bearings of both Lady Mary and her husband.

The Helikon Library at the Palace contains many works that were brought to Keszthely by Lady Mary from her father’s and brother's collections at Hamilton Palace.

The Palace grounds, on the shores of Lake Balaton, contains a Festetics family Mausoleum which is the final resting place of Lady Mary and her husband.

== Ancestry ==
Ancestors of Lady Mary Douglas-Hamilton

16. James Hamilton, 5th Duke of Hamilton
8. Archibald Hamilton, 9th Duke of Hamilton
17. Anne Spencer
4. Alexander Hamilton, 10th Duke of Hamilton
18. Alexander Stewart, 6th Earl of Galloway
9. Lady Harriet Stewart
19. Lady Catherine Cochrane
2. William Hamilton, 11th Duke of Hamilton
20. William Beckford
10. William Thomas Beckford
21. Maria Hamilton
5. Susan Beckford
22. Charles Gordon, 4th Earl of Aboyne
11. Lady Margaret Gordon
23. Lady Margaret Stewart
1. Lady Mary Victoria Douglas-Hamilton
24. Charles Frederick, Grand Duke of Baden
12. Charles Louis, Hereditary Prince of Baden
25. Princess Caroline Louise of Hesse-Darmstadt
6. Charles, Grand Duke of Baden
26. Louis IX, Landgrave of Hesse-Darmstadt
13. Landgravine Amalie of Hesse-Darmstadt
27. Countess Palatine Henriette Caroline of Zweibrücken
3. Princess Marie Amelie of Baden
28. Claude de Beauharnais, 1st Count des Roches-Baritaud
14. Claude de Beauharnais, 2nd Count des Roches-Baritaud
29. Marie-Anne-Françoise Mouchard de la Garde
7. Stéphanie de Beauharnais
30. Claude François de Lézay-Marnézia, 3rd Marquis of Lézay
15. Claudine Françoise de Lézay-Marnézia
31. Marie Claudine de Nettancourt-Vaubécourt
