= Klauzál Square Market Hall, Budapest =

Market hall in Budapest, Hungary built in 1897

Coordinates: 47.5002°N 19.0646°E

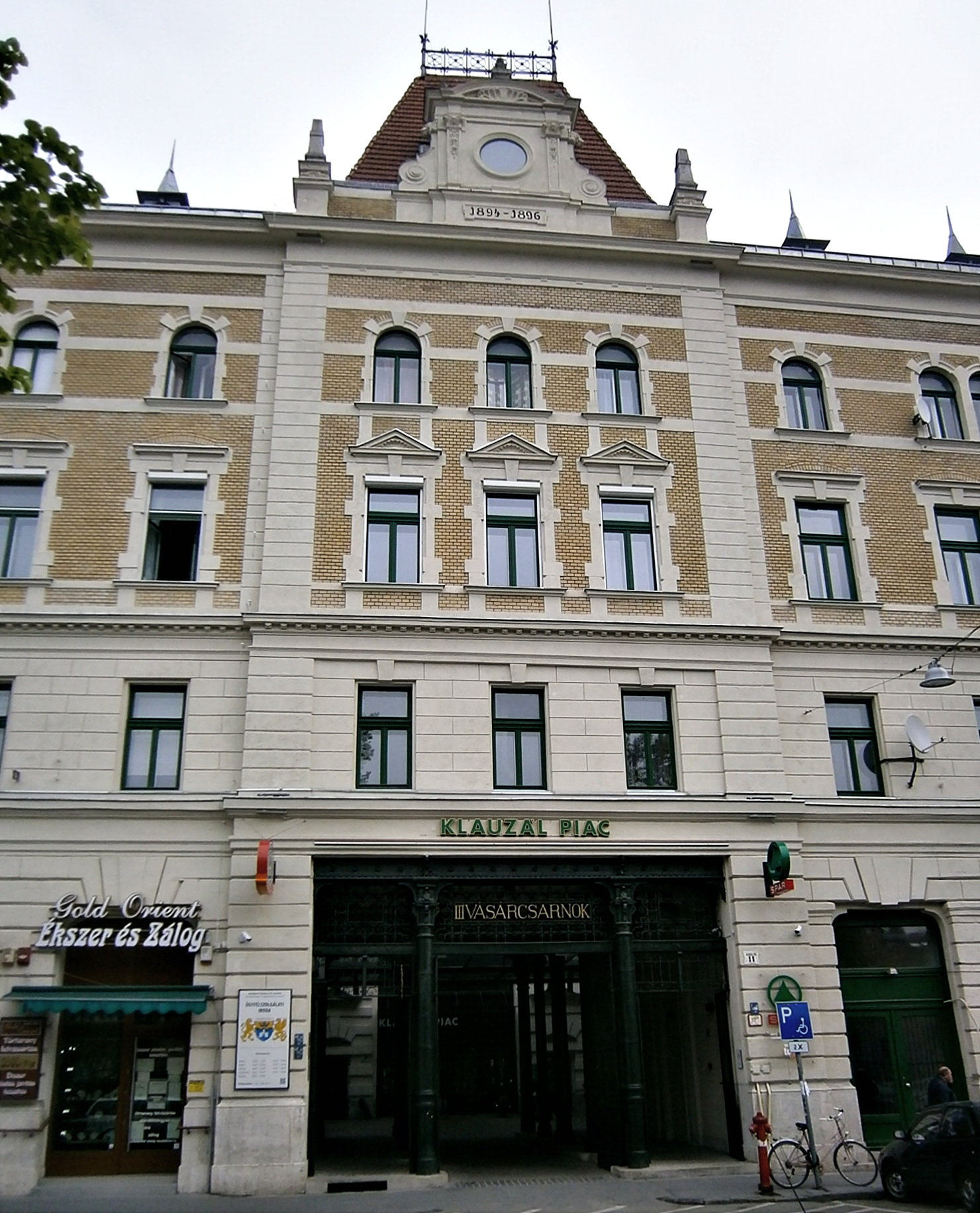

The Klauzál Square Market Hall or Market Hall III (formerly István Square Market Hall) is one of the great Budapest market halls built under the monarchy.

The building, located on Klauzál Square, in the district VII, was built in 1897 under the name of Market No. III. Its designers were the architects of the Budapest engineering office, József Kommer and Pál Klunzinger. In connection with the market hall, an apartment building was also built on Klauzál Square, which made it possible to rent outlets at lower prices. The number of contemporary sales outlets was over 300. Interestingly, Kosher food was available in a separate space in the hall, being in the Jewish Quarter.

The building, which became dilapidated in the second half of the 20th century, was renovated in 2014-2015, taking into account its original state and modern needs.

== Gallery ==
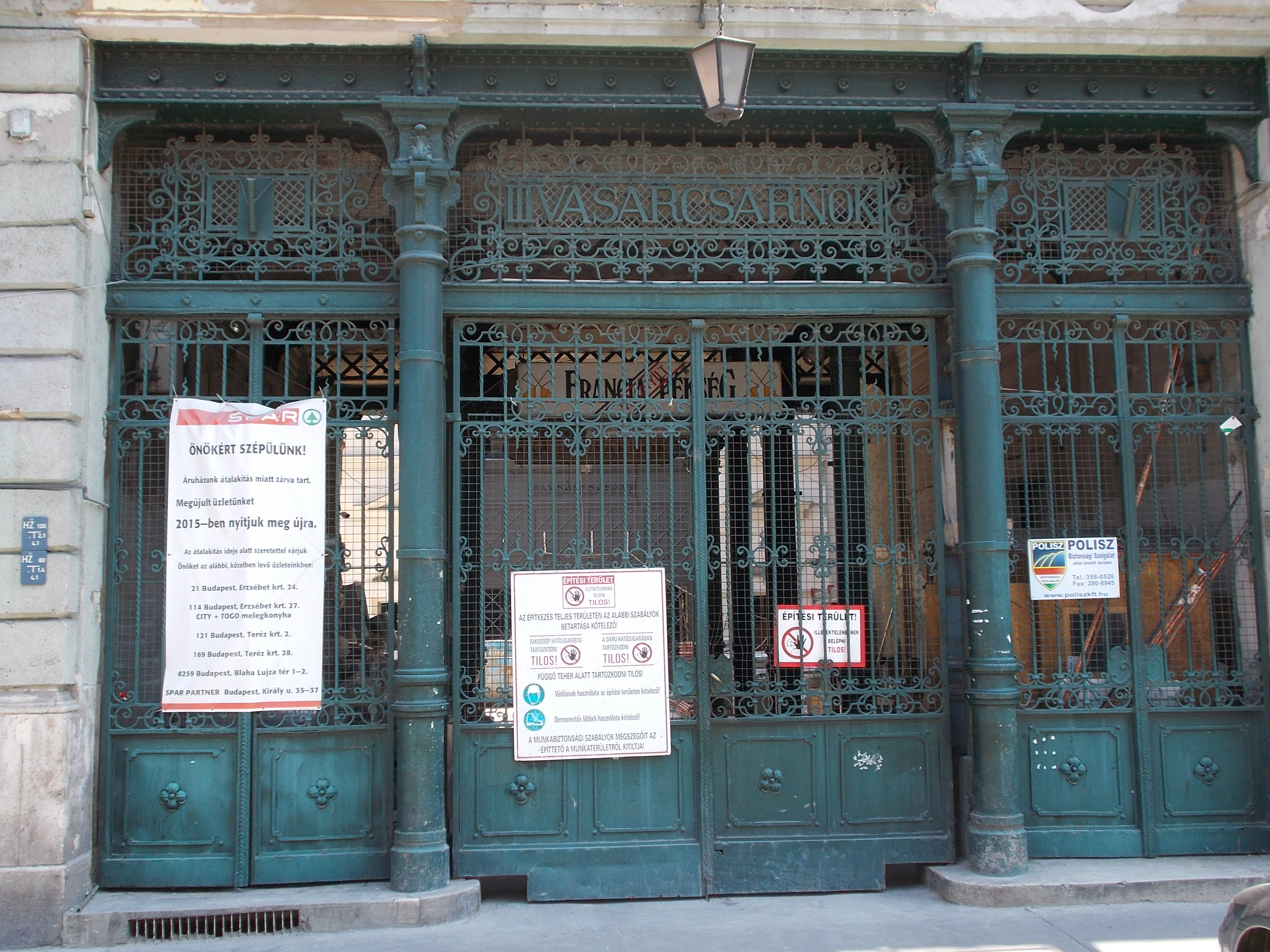

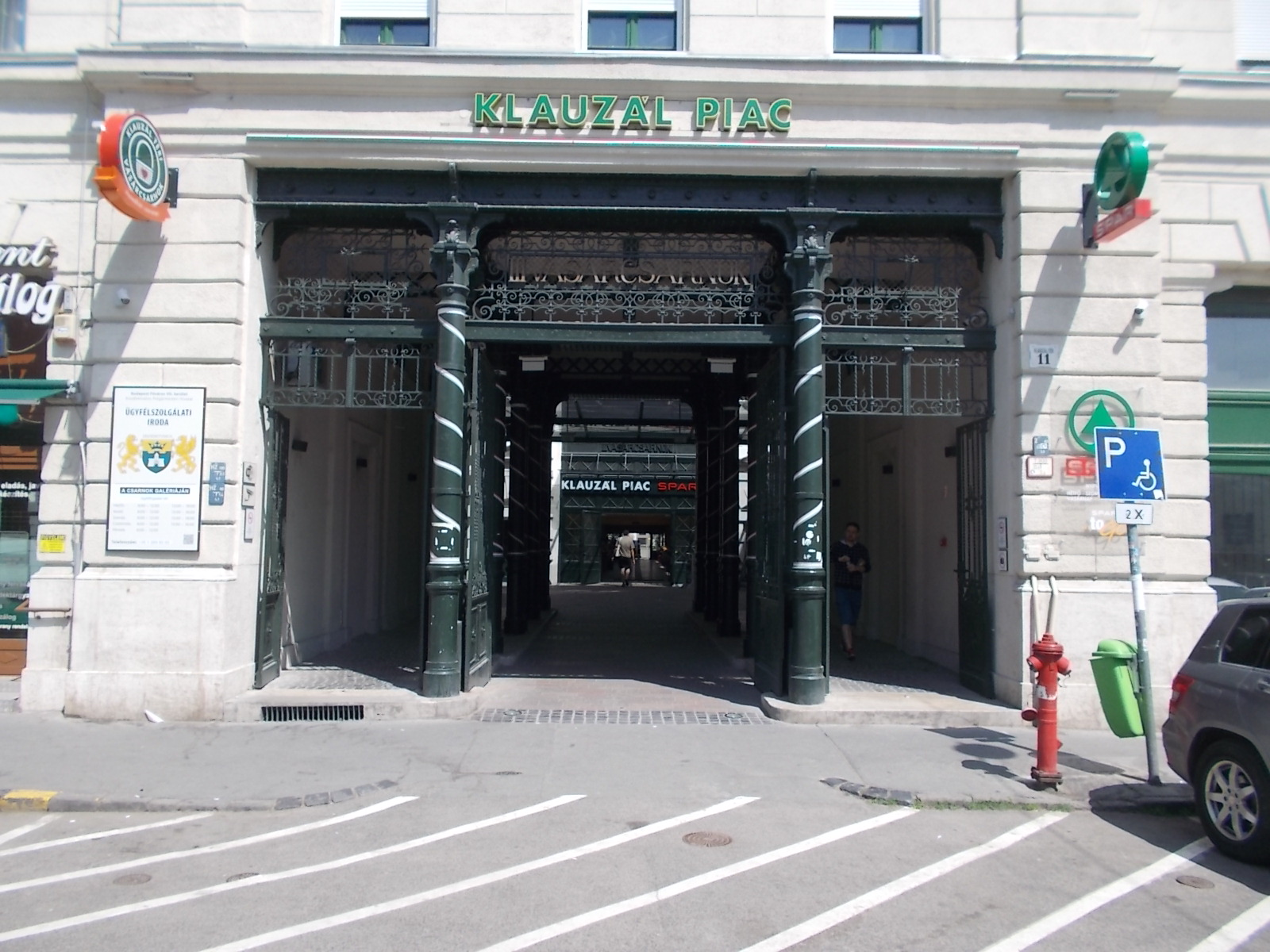

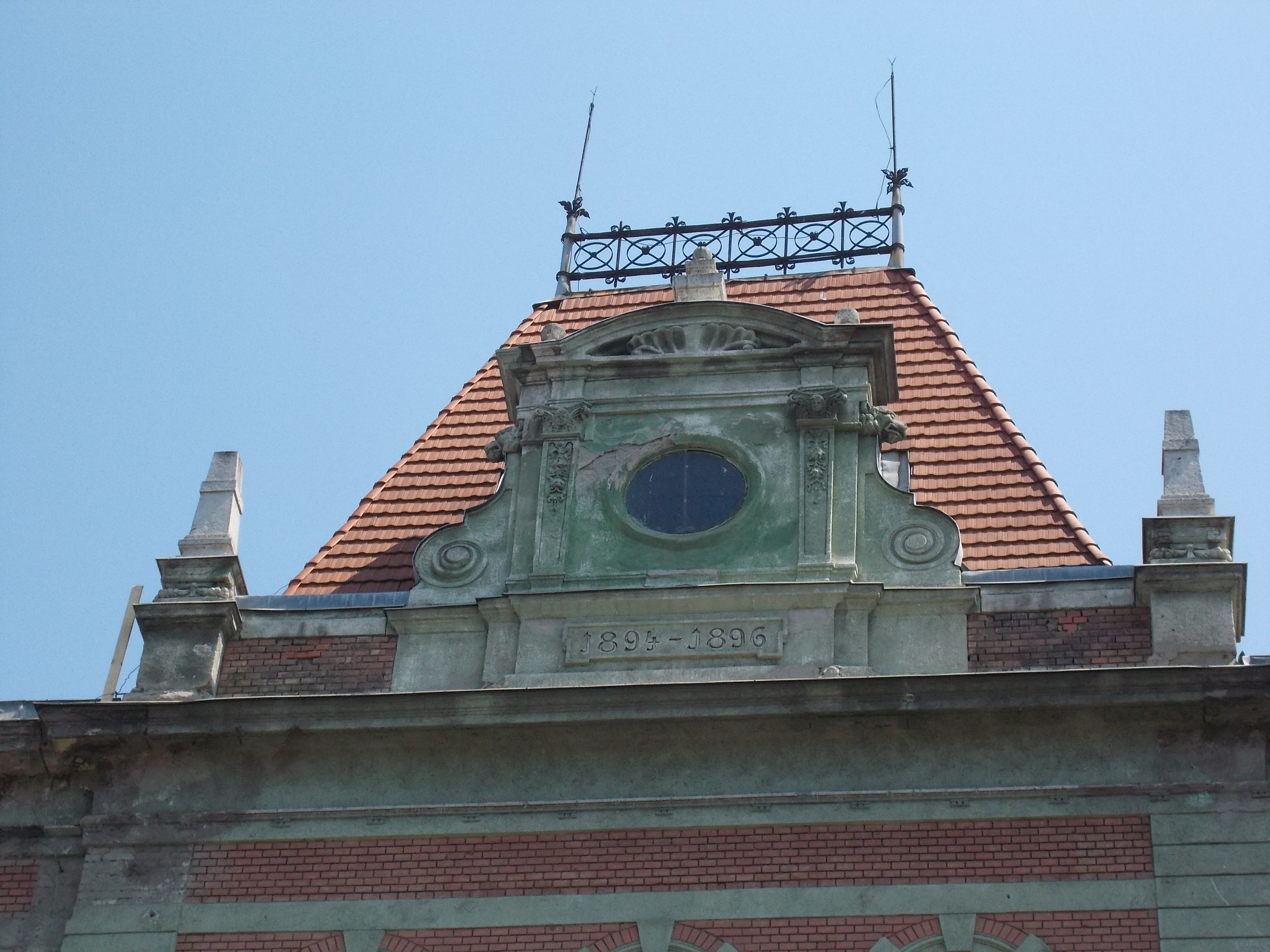

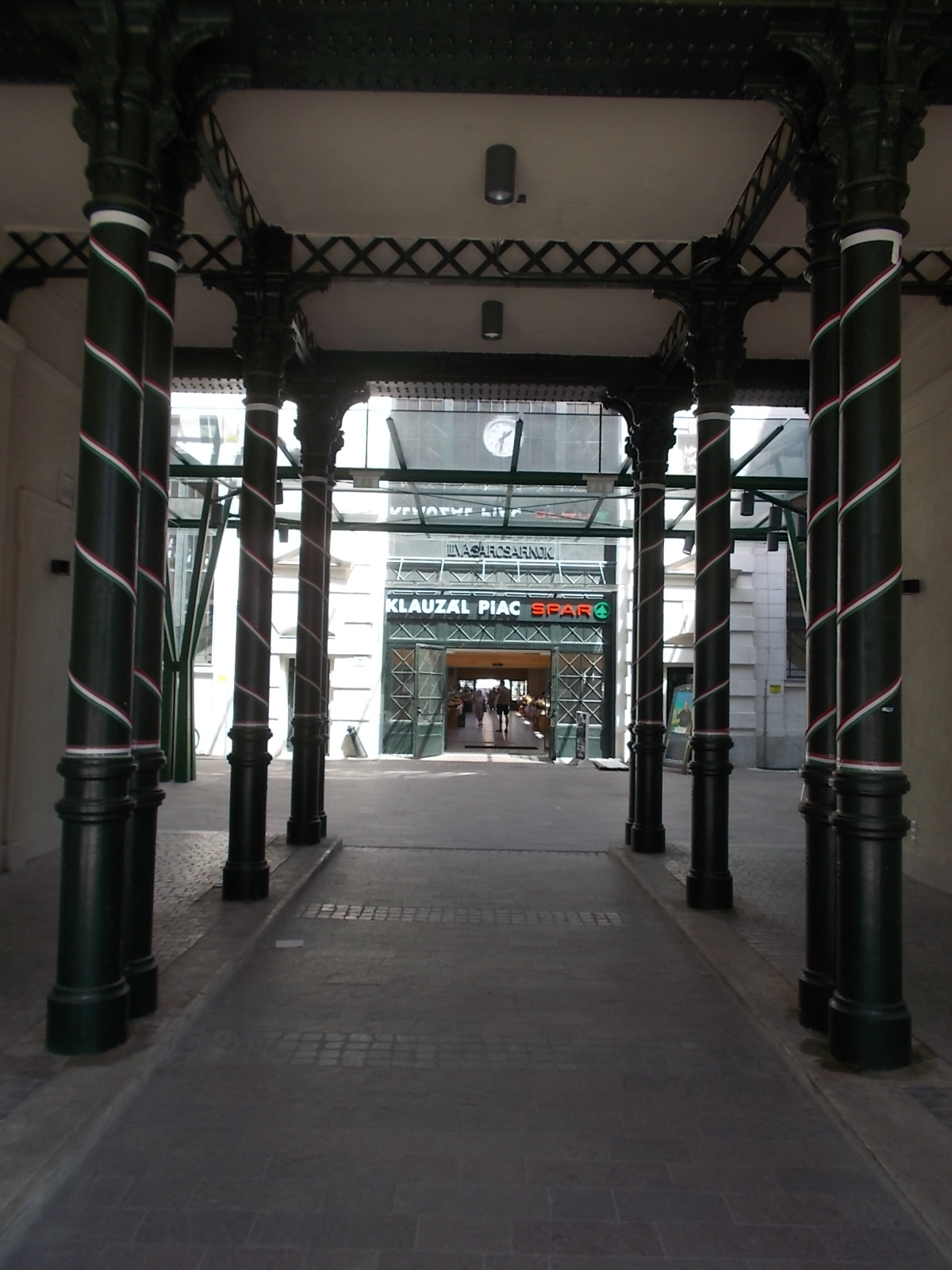

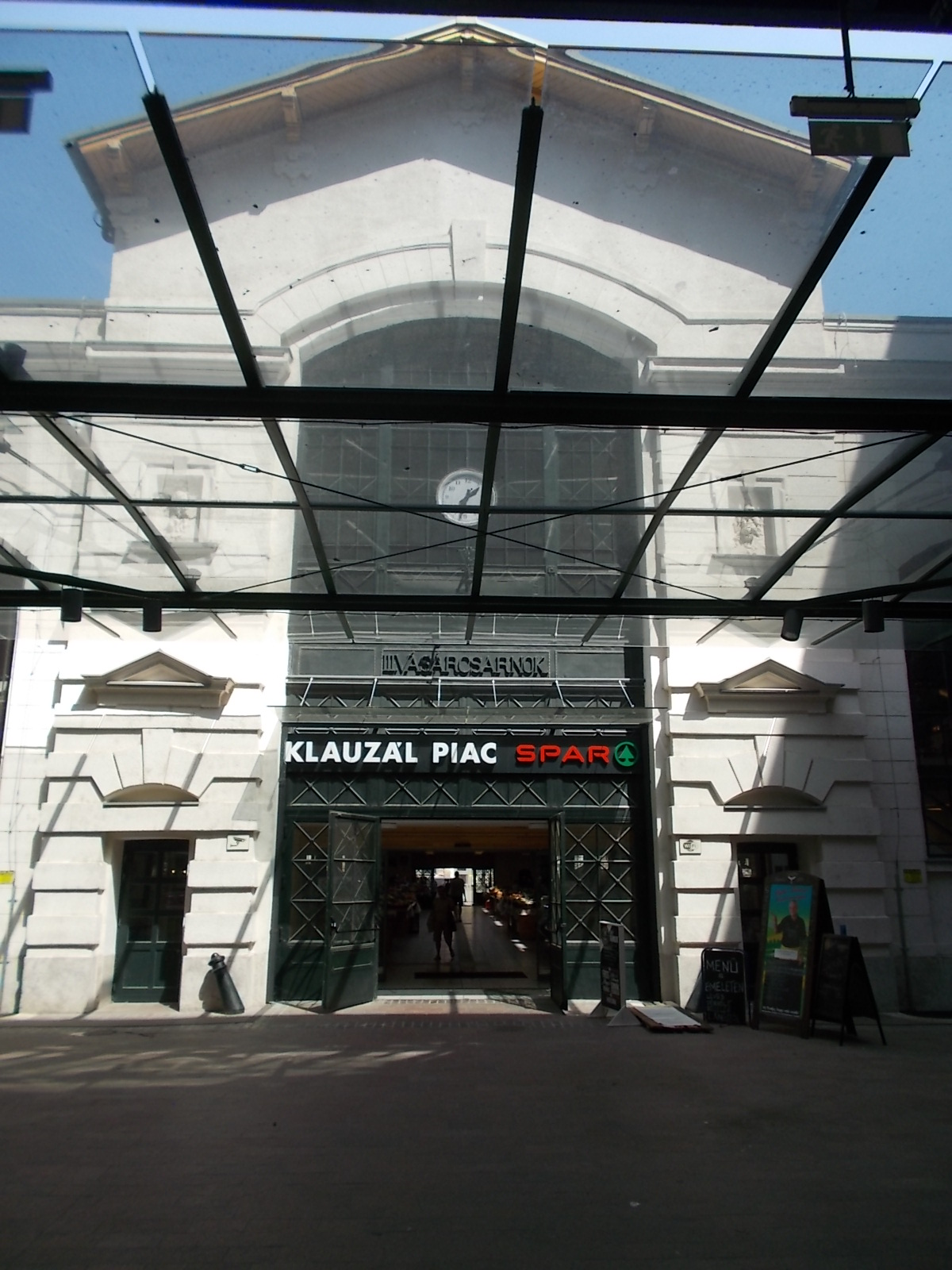

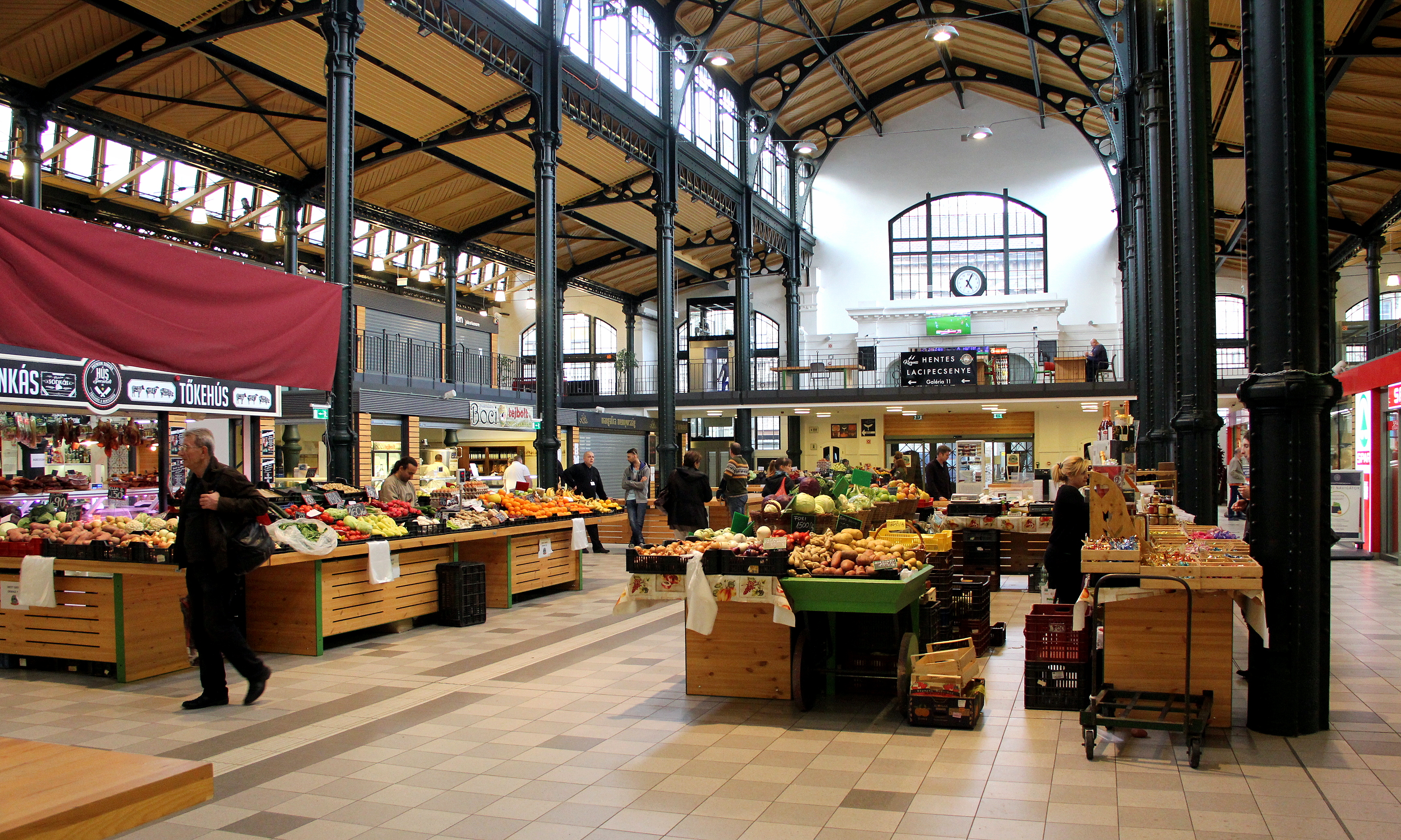

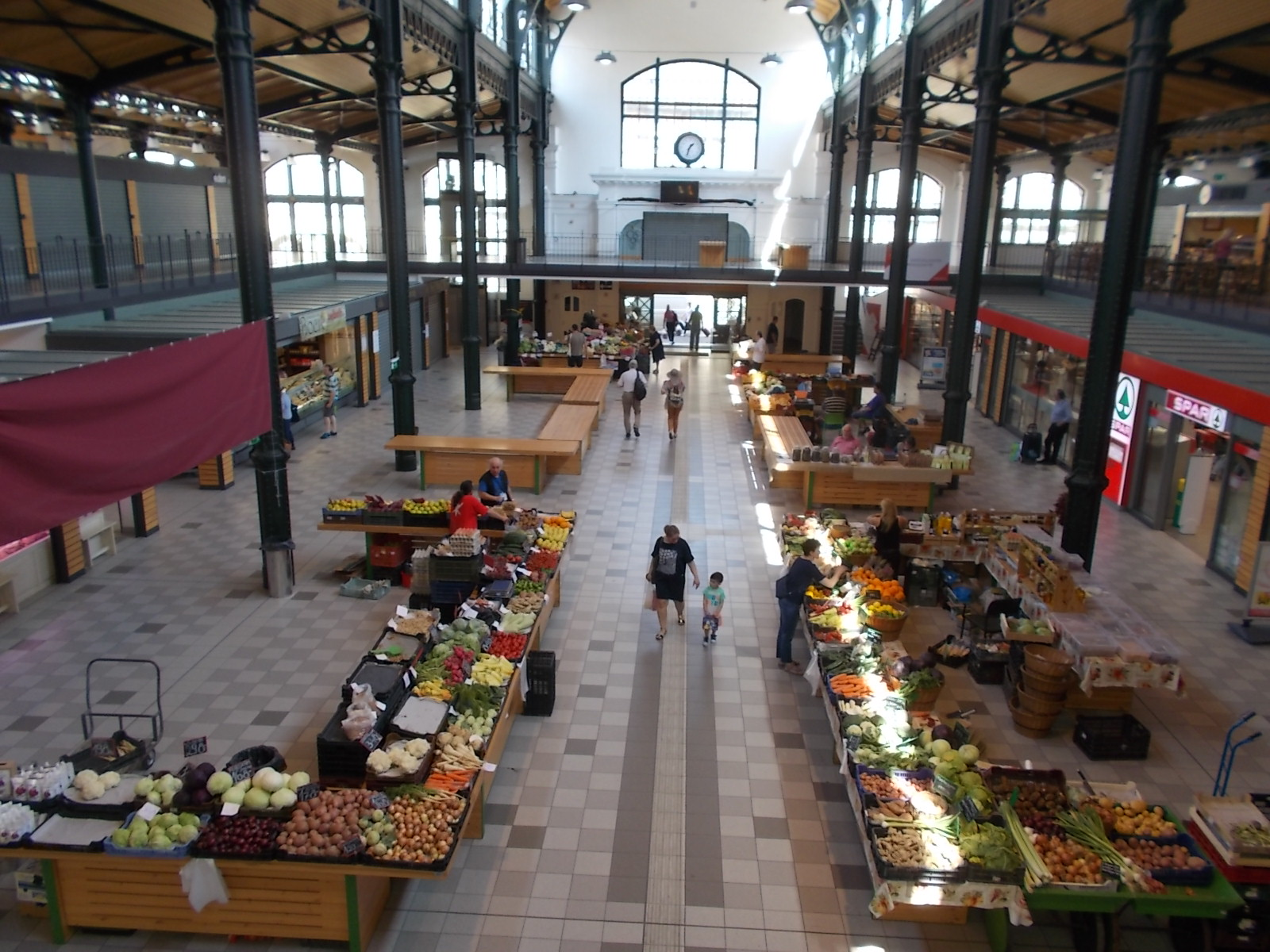

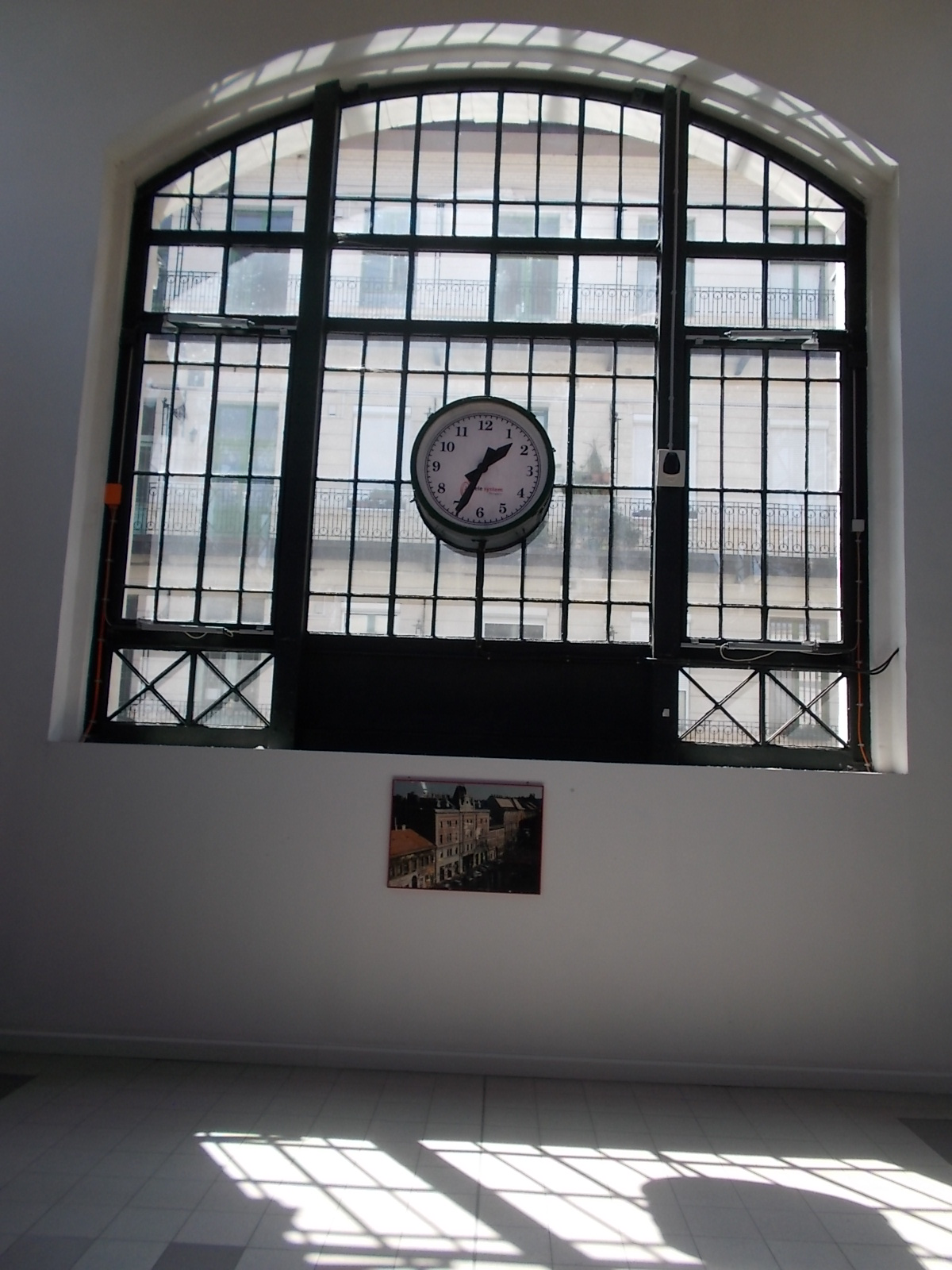
