= Gábor Klauzál =

Hungarian politician (1804–1866)

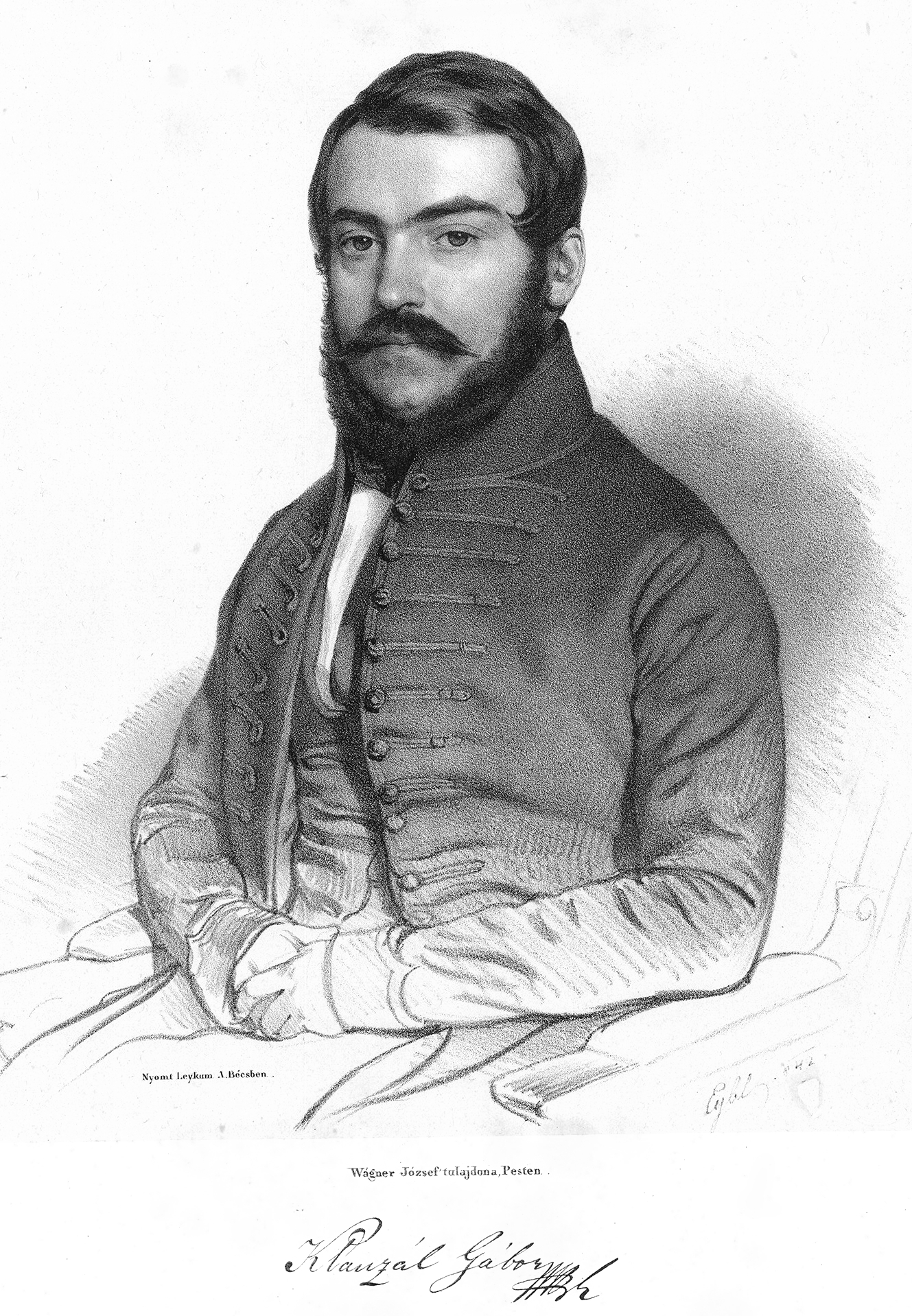

Minister of Agriculture, Industry and Trade of Hungary
- In office 23 March 1848 – 2 October 1848
- Preceded by: position established
- Succeeded by: Kázmér Batthyány

Personal details
- Born: 18 November 1804 Pest, Kingdom of Hungary
- Died: 3 August 1866 (aged 61) Kalocsa, Kingdom of Hungary
- Party: Opposition Party (1847–1848); Deák Party (1865–1866)
- Spouse: Emma Schmidt
- Children: Gábor; Mária; Emma
- Profession: politician

Gábor Klauzál de Szlavovicz (18 November 1804 – 3 August 1866) was a Hungarian politician, who served as Minister of Agriculture, Industry and Trade during the Hungarian Revolution of 1848 in the first government of Hungary. He studied in Szeged. He was a member of the National Assembly of Hungary from 1832 and served as one of the leaders of the liberal opposition on the Diet of 1843–44. He retired from politics in 1844 until the outbreak of the revolution.

As a minister he represented negotiating, moderate politics, he opposed the extreme politics which wanted to separate from the Austrian Empire, so Klauzál did not support the complete independence. He stuck out for calling to account of Count Franz Philipp von Lamberg's killers. During the beginning of the fights, he pulled back to his possessions. He was a member of the Deák Party in the 1860s and became a member of the National Assembly in 1861 and 1865.

The Klauzál Square in Budapest is named after him.

Political offices
Preceded by position established	Minister of Agriculture, Industry and Trade; 1848	Succeeded by Kázmér Batthyány
