= Belica, Međimurje County =

Belica
- Municipality
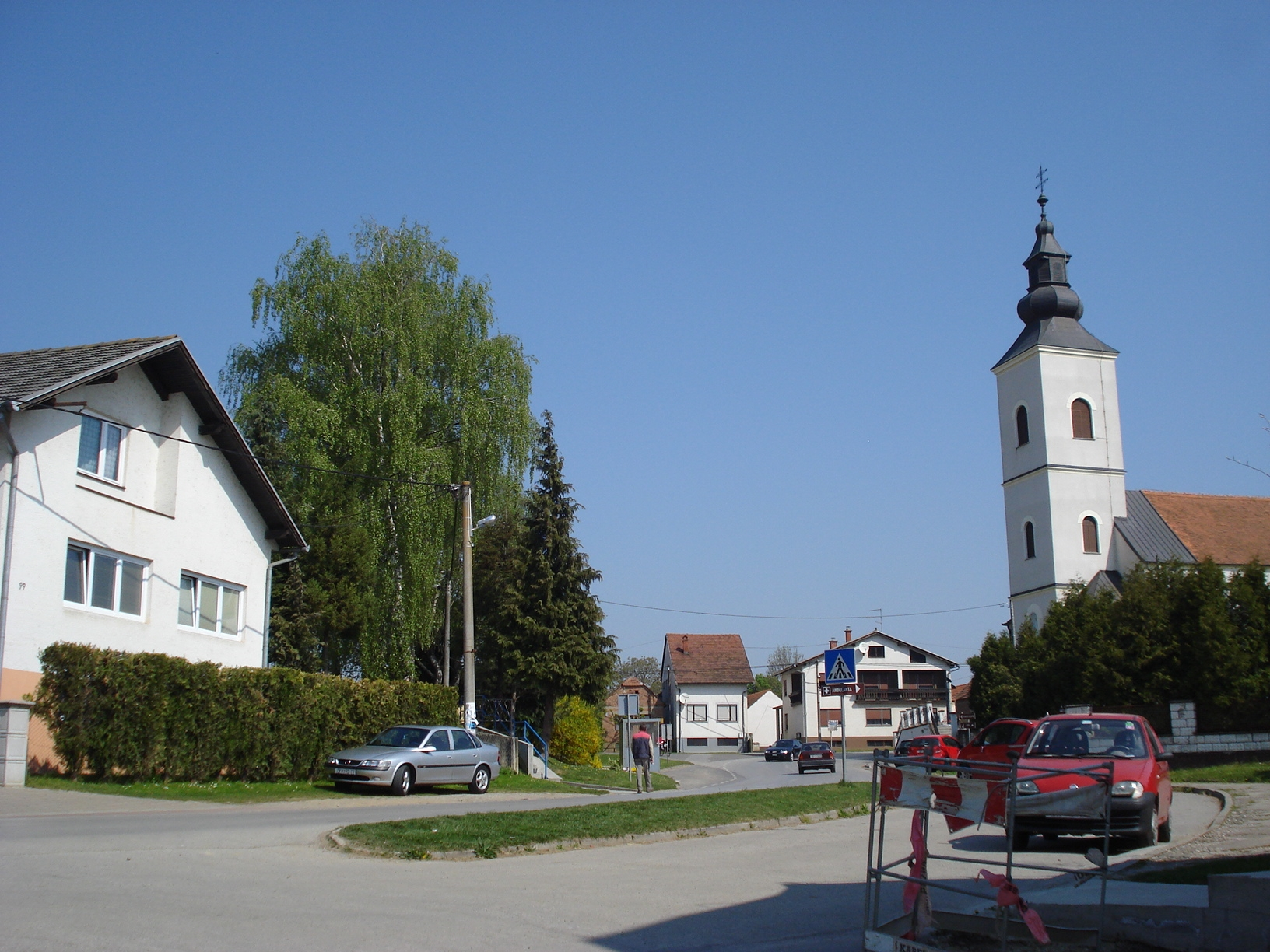
- Village centre

- Location within Croatia
- Coordinates: 46°24′N 16°31′E
- Country: Croatia
- Region: Northern Croatia (Međimurje)
- County: Međimurje County

Government
  - Municipal mayor: Petar Janušić (HNS)

Area
  - Municipality: 27.7 km^{2} (10.7 sq mi)
  - Urban: 17.1 km^{2} (6.6 sq mi)

Population (2021)
  - Municipality: 2,822
  - Density: 102/km^{2} (264/sq mi)
  - Urban: 2,038
  - Urban density: 119/km^{2} (309/sq mi)
- Time zone: UTC+1 (CET)
  - Summer (DST): UTC+2 (CEST)
- Postal code: 40319 Belica
- Website: belica.hr

Belica is a village and municipality in Međimurje County. The municipality seat is in the village of Belica, located around 5 kilometres east of Čakovec, the largest city of Međimurje County.

The municipality is known for its agriculture, especially potato farming. There is even a monument dedicated to potatoes, unveiled in August 2007, and a potato museum, unveiled in August 2025.

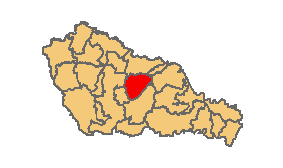
Location within Međimurje County

== History ==
Belica most likely got its name from a feudal lord named Bela at the beginning of the 13th century. The first historical mention of today's Belica dates back to 1256. A hundred years later, the Belch estate between the Mura and Drava rivers is mentioned. The current name Belica was first mentioned in 1638.

The first official population census was carried out during the reign of Emperor Joseph II. In 1786, there were 515 inhabitants in Belica, of which 244 were female, or 89 families living in 74 houses. The number of inhabitants in Belica decreased at the beginning of the 19th century. Official statistics show that there were only 62 houses in the village, in which there were 486 inhabitants.

A fire broke out in Belica on September 9, 1891, destroying 43 houses and a large number of barns. More than 60 families, or almost 250 people, lost everything they owned. The Croatian Peasant Savings Bank in Belica was founded on October 27, 1927, by Ljuboslav Kuntarić and in 1940 the bank had 215 members. Electrification was completed in the village in 1952, the village got asphalt in 1966, and the public water system was established in 1977.

== Demographics ==
According to the 2021 census, the Belica municipality had a total population of 2,822 living in the two villages that the municipality consists of:

- Belica, population 2,038
- Gardinovec, population 784

A total of 2,779 people living in the municipality (98.48%) identified themselves as Croats during the 2021 census.

Belica: Population trends 1857–2021
v

| population | 1856 | 2097 | 2366 | 2649 | 2710 | 2963 | 3378 | 3641 | 4062 | 4112 | 3951 | 3740 | 3664 | 3635 | 3509 | 3176 | 2822 |
| | 1857 | 1869 | 1880 | 1890 | 1900 | 1910 | 1921 | 1931 | 1948 | 1953 | 1961 | 1971 | 1981 | 1991 | 2001 | 2011 | 2021 |

Sources: Croatian Bureau of Statistics publications

== Administration ==
The current mayor of Belica is Petar Janušić (HNS) and the Belica Municipal Council consists of 13 seats.

| Groups | Councilors per group |
| HNS | 4 / 13 |
| NPS | 4 / 13 |
| SDP | 3 / 13 |
| HDZ | 2 / 13 |

== Culture ==
There is a kart circuit between Belica and the nearby village of Pribislavec. Both Belica and Gardinovec have their own football clubs, NK BSK Belica and NK Radnički Gardinovec, who compete in local amateur leagues.
