= Festetics family =

Hungarian noble family

Festetics Feštetić
- Country: Habsburg monarchy
- Founded: 15th century
- Founder: Petar Feštetić
- Current head: Georg Festetics

The House of Festetics (singular, not plural) or Feštetić (in Croatian) is a historic noble family of Hungarian counts and princes originating in Croatia, which dates back to the 15th century.

A prominent family during the Austro-Hungarian Empire, they are mostly known for the baroque Festetics Palace and the Viennese Prince Tasziló Festetics.

== Counts Festetics of Tolna ==
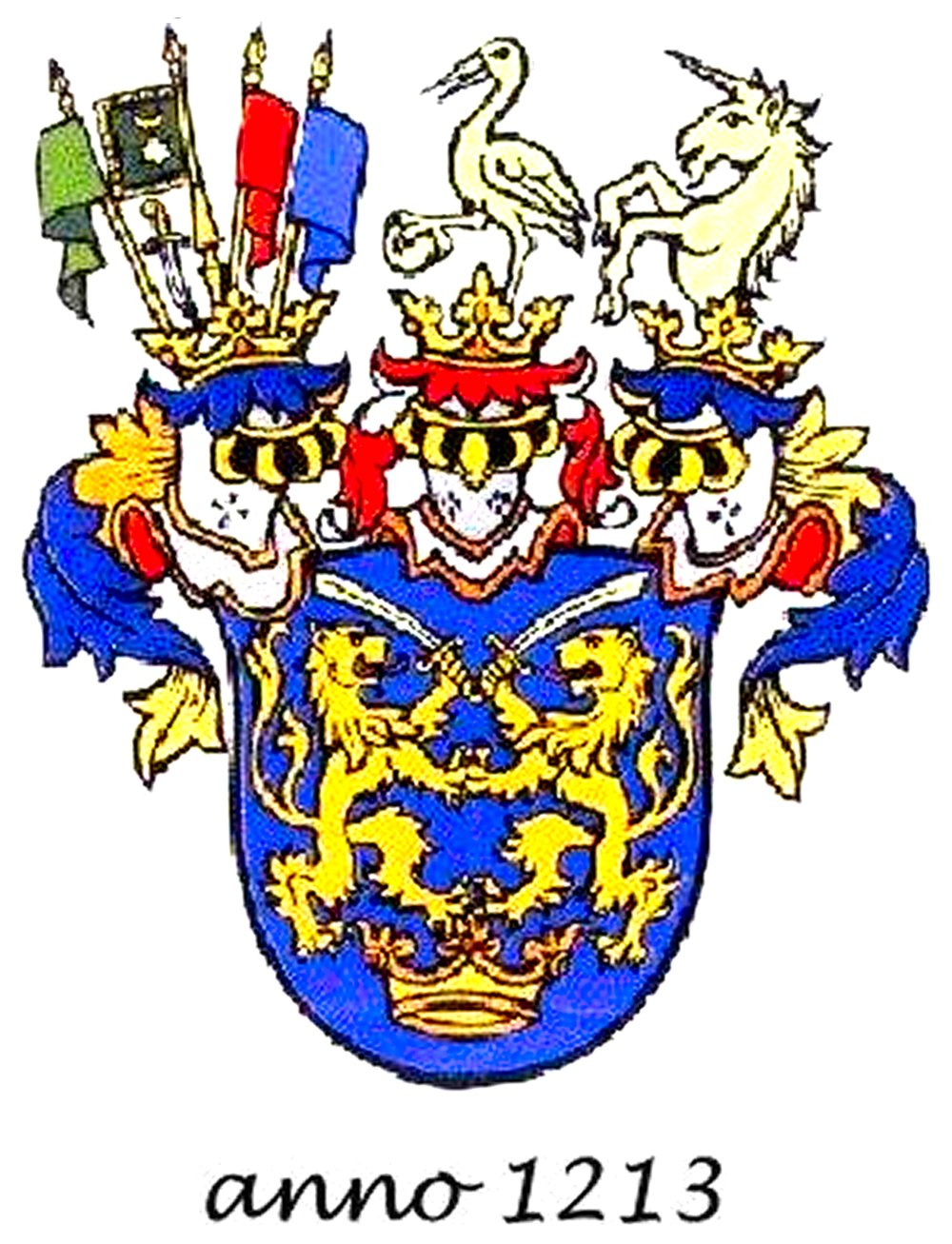
Original coat of arms of the Festetics family (1213)

The progenitor of the family is considered to be Peter Festetić or Petrus Ferztheschych from Roženica, Pokupsko in central Croatia, whose name was mentioned as such in the protocol from the second part of the 15th century. Born during the reign of Matthias Corvinus, he held large estates throughout Turopolje, southwest of Zagreb. Another protocol from 1570 mentions Mihovil Festetić (probably Peter's son), who served as ministerialis of the Bishop of Zagreb.

On 8 August 1746, Mihovil's descendants, Josef and Kristof Festetics (the two sons of the second marriage of Paul Festetics who moved to Hungary) added de Tolna to their surname (von Tolna in Austria).

On 5 November 1766, Josef's eldest son Pal Festetics de Tolna (1725–1782) was made a count by Queen Maria Theresa of Hungary. On 24 February 1772, Kristof's eldest son Pal Festetics de Tolna (1722–1782) was made a count by Queen Maria Theresa of Hungary, who was also Archduchess of Austria and Holy Roman Empress. The title of count was hereditary, inheritable by all legitimate male-line descendants of the family.

== Princes Festetics of Tolna ==
On 21 June 1911, Count Tassilo Festetics de Tolna (1850–1933) was made a prince (Fürst) with the style of Serene Highness (Durchlaucht) by King Francis Joseph I of Hungary. His grandson, Prince Georg (born 1940) is the current head of the house and third Fürst.

== Dutch nobility incorporation ==
In 1973, Count Dénes Festetics de Tolna (1943) was incorporated in the Dutch nobility with the title of count; the title of count(ess) is inheritable by all male-line descendants.

== Notable members ==
Among the other prominent members of the family are:

- Antal Festetics (born 1937), Austrian biologist
- Andor Festetics (1843–1930), Hungarian politician
- György Festetics (1815–1883), Hungarian politician
- Leo Festetics (1800–1884), Hungarian composer
- Sándor Festetics (1882–1956), Hungarian politician
- Tassilo Festetics de Tolna (1813–1883), Austrian general
- Ernő Festetics de Tolna (1915–1957), racing driver

Festetics/Feštetić may also refer to:

- the Feštetić Castle, located in Pribislavec, a village near Čakovec, Međimurje County, northern Croatia
- the Festetics Palace, located in Keszthely, Hungary
- the Festetics String Quartet, from Budapest, Hungary

== See also ==
- List of titled noble families in the Kingdom of Hungary
