= Klauzál tér (Budapest) =

Square in Budapest, Hungary

Coordinates: 47.499779°N 19.063722°E

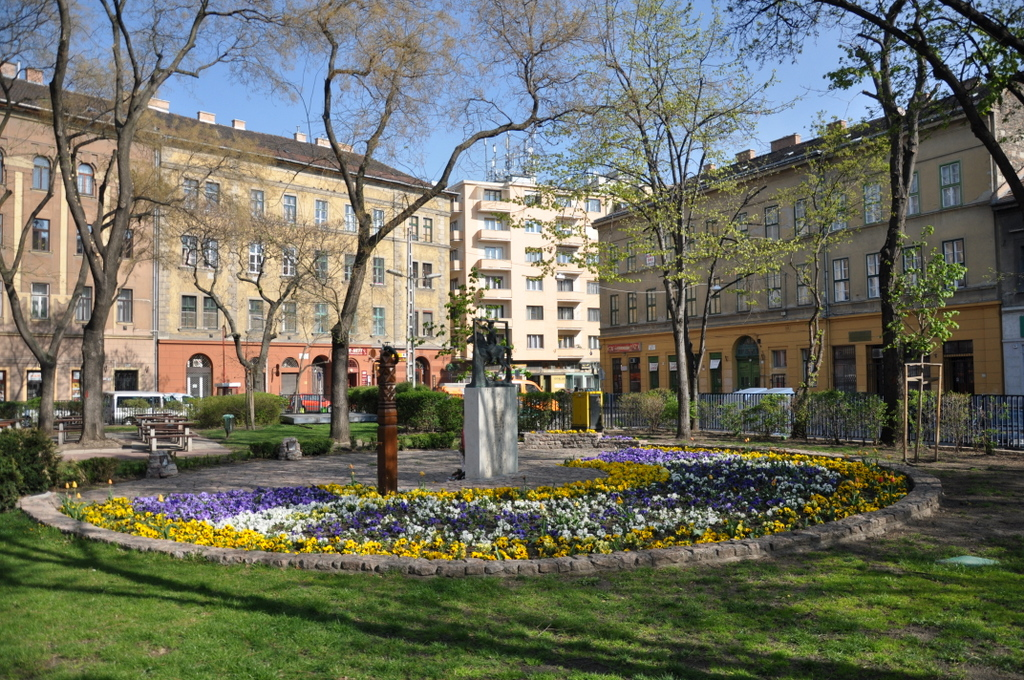
Klauzál Square, Budapest

The Klauzál tér (or Klauzal Square) was the largest square in the former Jewish quarter of Budapest, Hungary. Located in the seventh district, it was the heart of the city's old Jewish quarter. Nowadays, this area is also known as the party district in Hungarian bulinegyed, because of its many pubs nearby.

== History ==
The original name of this square was Stephans Platz. After 1874, it was known as István tér. In 1907, the square was named after Gábor Klauzál. Gábor Klauzál was a minister of the Reform Age. In the year of 1848 he was the Minister of Agriculture, Industry and Trade of Hungary.

A theater opened in the square in the year of 1872, but destroyed in the year of 1874 because of a conflagration. A shopping hall (not open air market), Klauzál Square Market Hall, opened in 1897, in the place of former theater; this was the third shopping hall in Budapest.

Jenő Brandi lived here in this area. In memory of Attila Gérecz, martyr of the 1956 Revolution, a plaque was erected at Klauzál tér 9 (Klauzál square 9). Another interesting about the square is that the old tram Nr. 2 went through it. The tram line ran from Keleti Railway Station to Angyalföld.
