= Kázmér Batthyány =

Hungarian politician (1807–1854)

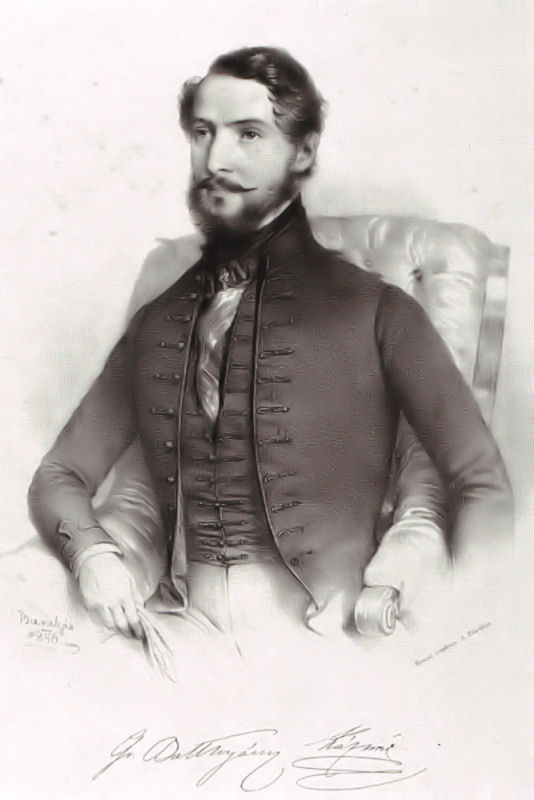

Minister of Foreign Affairs of Hungary
- In office 8 May 1849 – 16 July 1849
- Preceded by: Pál Esterházy
- Succeeded by: György Festetics

Personal details
- Born: 3 June 1807; Pozsony, Kingdom of Hungary
- Died: 13 July 1854 (aged 47); Paris, Second French Empire
- Political party: Opposition Party (1847–1848)
- Spouse: Auguszta Keglevich de Buzin
- Children: 0
- Profession: politician

Count Kázmér Antal Ferenc Batthyány de Németújvár (3 June 1807 – 13 July 1854) was a Hungarian politician, who served as Minister of Foreign Affairs during the Hungarian Revolution of 1848. At the beginning he was a conservative aristocrat politician but his views changed after a journey to Western Europe. He gradually became liberal and learnt the Hungarian language. In the House of Magnates of Hungary he supported the reforms of the industry and traffic. He also supported the protection of Hungarian products and the liberation of the serfs.

At the time of the revolution he fought in Délvidék against the rebel Serbs as a volunteer. In 1849 Bertalan Szemere appointed him as Minister of Foreign Affairs. The position's new title shows that Hungary wanted to separate from the Habsburg monarchy. Batthyány also served as acting Minister of Agriculture, Industry and Trade. In August 1849 he immigrated to Turkey along with Lajos Kossuth. From 1851 he lived in Paris.

Political offices
Preceded by Pál Esterházy	Minister of Foreign Affairs; 1849	Succeeded by György Festetics
Preceded by Gábor Klauzál	Minister of Agriculture, Industry and Trade; Acting; 1849	Succeeded by István Gorove
