= György Festetics =

Hungarian politician

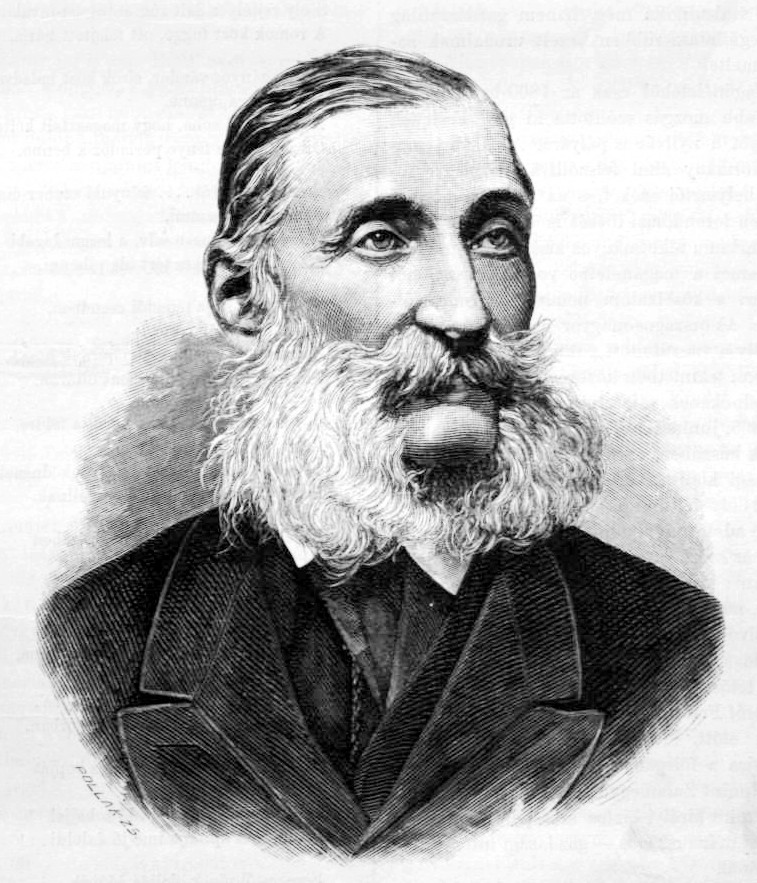

Minister besides the King of Hungary
- In office 20 February 1867 – 19 May 1871
- Preceded by: Kázmér Batthyány
- Succeeded by: Béla Wenckheim

Personal details
- Born: 23 April 1815 Vienna, Empire of Austria
- Died: 12 February 1883 (aged 67) Vienna, Austria-Hungary
- Party: Independent
- Profession: politician

Count György László Festetics de Tolna (23 April 1815 – 12 February 1883) was a Hungarian politician, who served as Minister besides the King between 1867 and 1871.

== Early life and ancestry ==
He was the offspring from the Hungarian noble House of Festetics. His father was Count Festetics László (1785–1846), and his mother was Princess Josefine of Hohenzollern-Hechingen (1790-1856). His paternal grandfather was count György Festetics de Tolna (1755-1819), who founded the prestigious agricultural college Georgikon, the first of its kind in Europe, that operated in the Festetics Palace in Keszthely.

== Private life ==
On 17 February 1849 he married Countess Eugénia Erdődy (b. November 1826; d. August 1894), daughter of Count Kajetan Erdődy (1795-1856) and Countess Ernestine of Lerchenfeld-Prennberg (1798-1863). They were parents of Prince Tasziló Festetics von Tolna.

== Ancestry ==
Ancestors of György Festetics

16. Baron Kristóf Festetics de Tolna
8. Count Pál Festetics de Tolna
17. Judit Mezőszegedi
4. Count György Festetics de Tolna
18. Count Imre Bossányi de Nagybossány
9. Countess Júlia Bossányi de Nagybossány
19. Éva Korláthköy
2. Count László Festetics de Tolna
20. István Sallér de Jakabháza
10. István Sallér de Jakabháza
21. Countess Klára Nádasdy de Nemes
5. Judit Sallér de Jakabháza
22. István Motesiczky
11. Judit Motesiczky de Felsőmontesicz et Keselőkő
23. Countess Anna Sándor de Szlavnicza
1. György Festetics
24. Count Herrmann Friedrich of Hohenzollern-Hechingen
12. Count Franz Xaver of Hohenzollern-Hechingen
25. Countess Josefa von Oettingen-Spielberg
6. Hermann, Prince of Hohenzollern-Hechingen
26. Count Herman IX Otto van Hoensbroeck-Geulle
13. Countess Anna von Hoensbroech
27. Countess Anna Maria von Daun gen. Zievel, Herrn zu Bettenburg
3. Princess Josefine of Hohenzollern-Hechingen
28. Ernst Jakob, Domherr zu Köln, Erbtruchseß von Waldburg-Wurzach
14. Franz Ernst, Erbtruchseß Gf von Waldburg zu Zeil und Friedberg
29. Countess Anna Ludovika von Waldburg zu Wolfegg
7. Countess Maria Antonia von Waldburg zu Zeil und Wurzach
30. Albrecht Eusebius, Count of Königsegg-Rothenfels
15. Maria Eleonora, Countess von Königsegg und Rothenfels
31. Countess Klara Philippina von Manderscheid

Political offices
Preceded by Kázmér Batthyány	Minister besides the King; 1867–1871	Succeeded by Béla Wenckheim
