= Pribislavec =

- Municipality
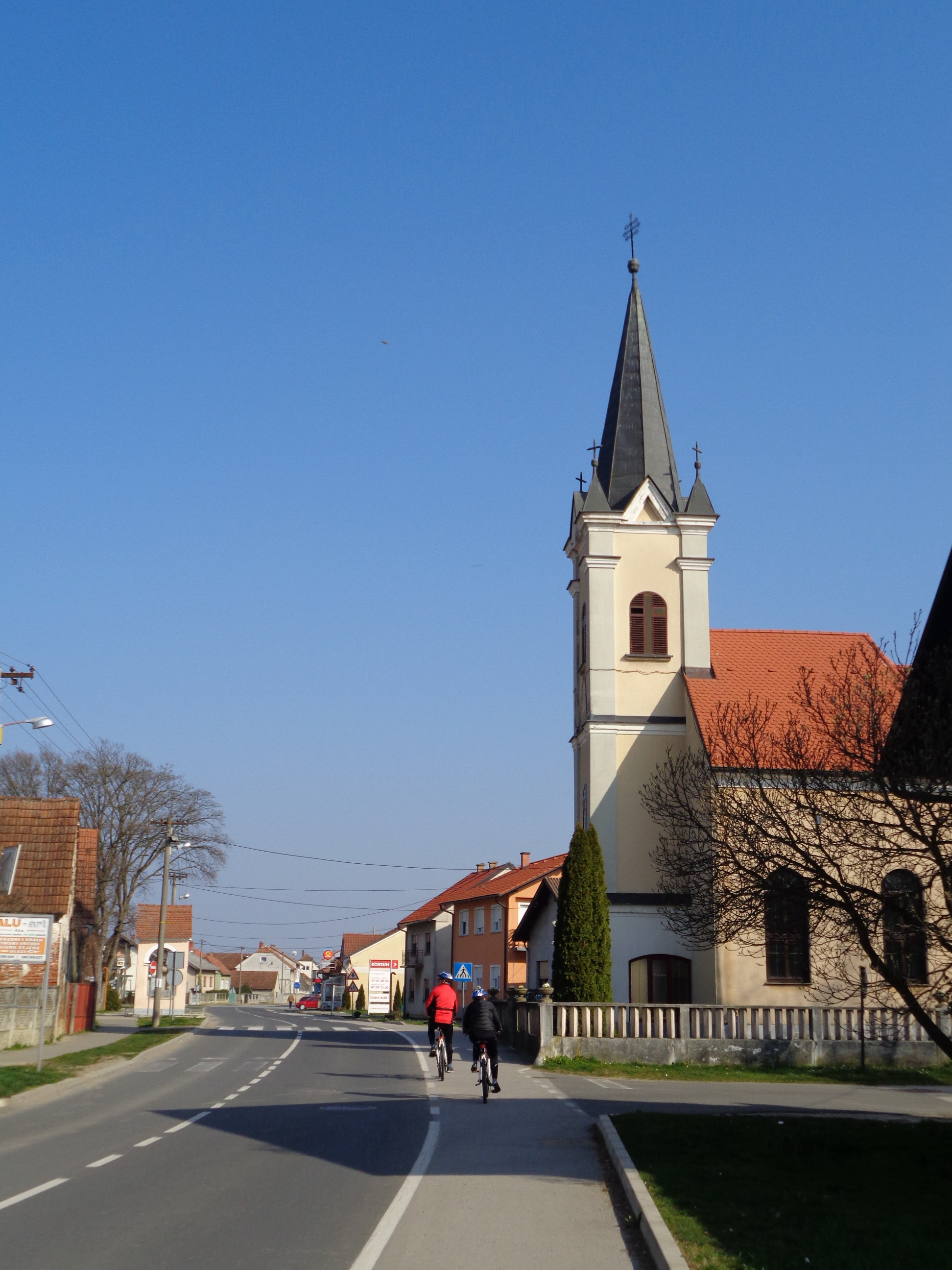
- Main street in Pribislavec

- Location of Pribislavec in Croatia
- Coordinates: 46.39°N 16.48°E
- Country: Croatia
- Region: Northern Croatia (Međimurje)
- County: Međimurje County

Government
  - Mayor: Matija Ladić (Democrats)

Area
  - Municipality: 11.1 km^{2} (4.3 sq mi)
  - Urban: 11.1 km^{2} (4.3 sq mi)

Population (2021)
  - Municipality: 2,963
  - Density: 267/km^{2} (691/sq mi)
  - Urban: 2,963
  - Urban density: 267/km^{2} (691/sq mi)
- Time zone: UTC+1 (CET)
  - Summer (DST): UTC+2 (CEST)
- Website: pribislavec.hr

Pribislavec (Hungarian: Zalaújvár; Kajkavian: Prslavec) is a village and municipality in Međimurje County, in northern Croatia.

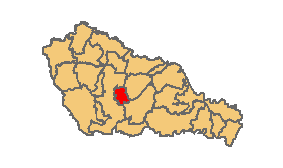
Location within Međimurje County

== History ==
Pribislavec is first mentioned in the 14th century as possessio Pobozlouhaza as a possession of the Lacković noble family. In a charter issued in 1478 the village is recorded as Pribislawecz. Its name is derived from the personal name Pribislav which is of Slavic origin. In 1870, count Juraj Feštetić built the Neo-Gothic Feštetić Castle in the village.

The Municipality of Pribislavec was established in October 2001.

=== 2019 Anti-Romani Demonstrations ===
On June 1, 2019, a group led by Alen Pancer, a veteran of the Croatian War of Independence, announced anti-romani demonstrations under the title "I want a normal life" (Croatian: Želim normalan život) at the county's administrative center in Čakovec. Veljko Kajtazi, the parliamentary representative of the Roma national minority, expressed his surprise with the singling out of the Roma which disturbed the entire community. Kajtazi expressed his dissatisfaction with the fact that the City of Čakovec did not permit the follow-up counter-protest for the next day. Kajtazi's press conference in the Croatian Parliament was interrupted by Croatian Growth MP Hrvoje Zekanović. The independent Serb weekly paper Novosti wrote that the organizer of the demonstration was Željka Markić, a sympathizer of Ruža Tomašić who is associated with nationalist and right wing groups. The organizers denied that the protest was anti-Romani stating that even "among the Roma there are honorable and honest people". The European Roma Rights Centre called upon authorities of the Međimurje County to clarify why they supported the protest stating that "it is unacceptable for a multicultural, democratic and antifascist state to tolerate demonstrations against entire groups of people". Prior to gathering, the demonstration was condemned by the President of the Union of Roma in Croatia, Suzana Krčmar and the representative of the Međimurje Roma community, Matija Oršuš. Pribislavec Municipality Mayoress Višnja Ivačić expressed her full support for the demonstration and invited other municipalities in the county to join in.

== Demographics ==
According to the 2021 census, the Pribislavec municipality had a total population of 2,963. Pribislavec is the only village in the municipality.

Pribislavec: Population trends 1857–2021
v

population	537	634	831	954	1017	1121	1395	1617	1940	2028	2167	2354	2568	2746	2929	3136	2963
	1857	1869	1880	1890	1900	1910	1921	1931	1948	1953	1961	1971	1981	1991	2001	2011	2021

Sources: Croatian Bureau of Statistics publications

== Administration ==
The current mayor of Pribislavec is Matija Ladić and the Pribislavec Municipal Council consists of 13 seats.

Groups	Councilors per group
Democrats	7 / 13
DOSIP	5 / 13
Independent	1 / 13

== Sports ==
Pribislavec has an own football club, NK Polet Pribislavec, whose home ground is located in the western part of the village. It has a capacity of around 1,000 and is equipped with floodlighting. The club won the Međimurje County First League in 2010 and were promoted to the Croatian Fourth League.

Pribislavec Airfield is a small sports airfield located between Pribislavec and Belica. It has one grassy runway and is mostly used by light aircraft and gliders. A kart circuit is also located between Pribislavec and Belica, next to the airfield.

== See also ==
- Feštetić Castle

== Literature ==
- Obad Šćitaroci, Mladen; Bojanić Obad Šćitaroci, Bojana; Dundović, Boris (2013). "Manors and Gardens in Northern Croatia in the Age of Historicism" (PDF). Centropa. pp. 175–186. ISSN 1532-5563. Archived from the original (PDF) on 2025-05-05.
