= Feštetić Castle =

Castle in Northern Croatia

Coordinates: 46°23′45″N 16°28′40″E

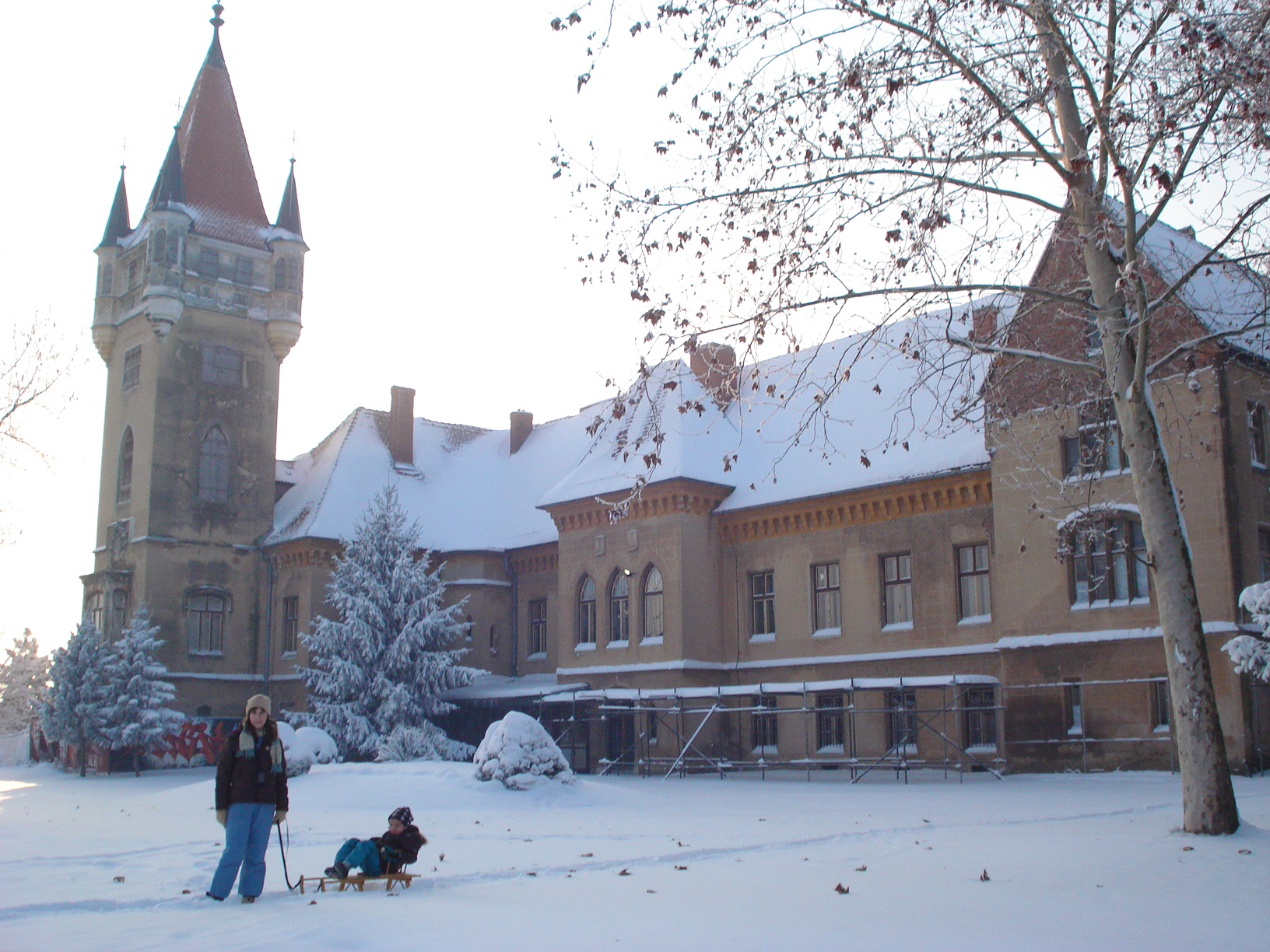
Feštetić castle in winter - eastern side

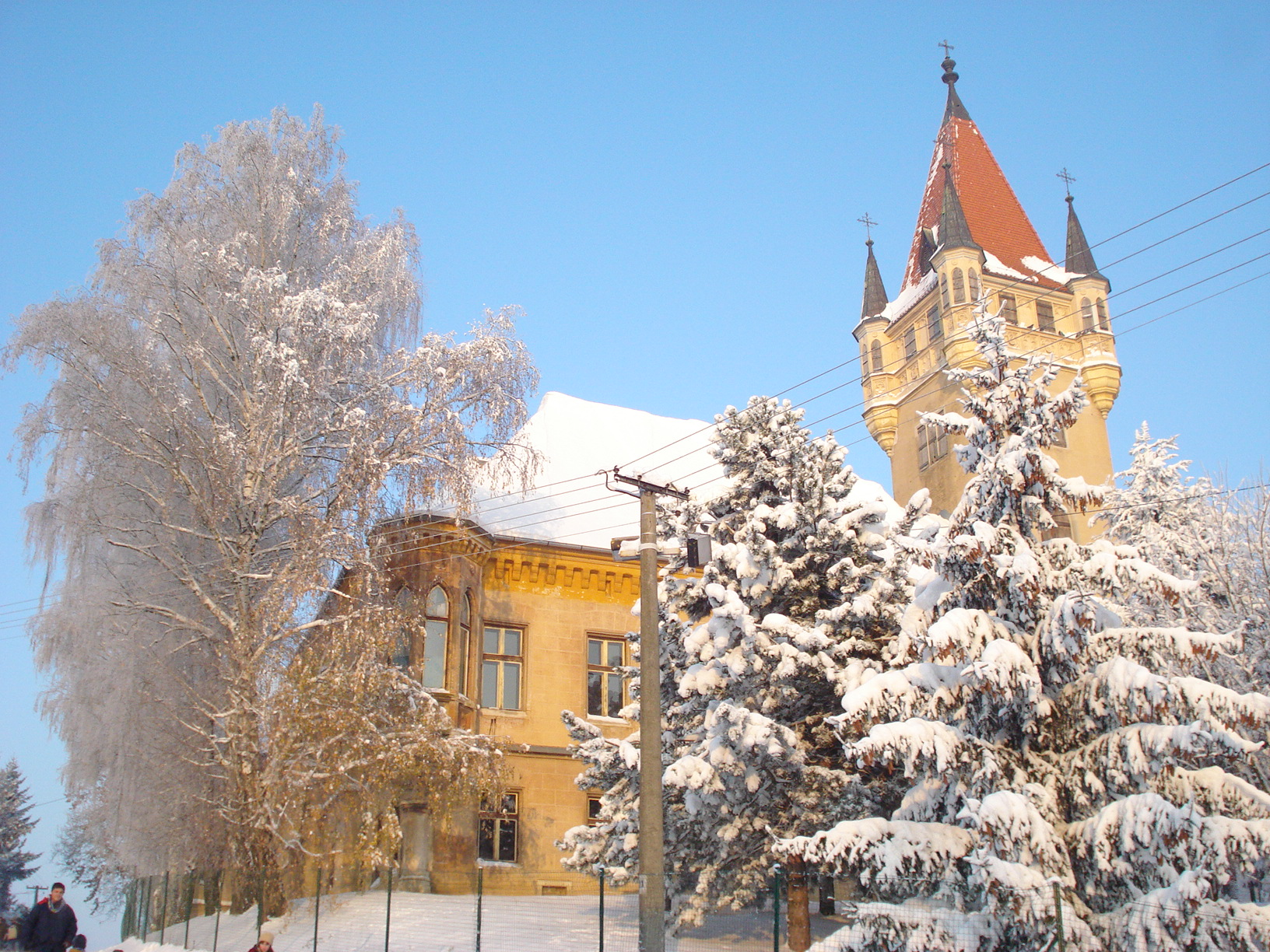
A winter idyll at the castle - south view

Feštetić Castle (Croatian: Dvorac Feštetić or Kaštel Feštetić) is a castle in Pribislavec, a village next to the town of Čakovec, northern Croatia.

It was built most probably in the 16th century and owned by the members of the Zrinski family (count Adam Zrinski) almost till the end of the 17th century. The name of the castle comes from the Croatian-Hungarian Feštetić family, who possessed it from 1791 until 1923.

Before its reconstruction in 1870, ordered by count György Festetics, the castle was surrounded by a park and a lovely garden with a chapel in it. The reconstruction gave it the neogothic look, especially marked by a tower (steeple) on the southeastern side, bay windows, garlands and door and window jambs.

Although having been devastated and ablazed for several times during the wars in the past centuries, this building structure, considered by many as the most beautiful and most romantic castle in Međimurje County, was always renewed. It now functions as a local primary school.
