= Festetics String Quartet =

The Festetics Quartet (Hungarian pronunciation: [ˈfɛʃtɛtit͡ʃ]) are a string quartet from Budapest, Hungary.

The members are Istvan Kertesz, first violin; Erika Petoefi, second violin; Péter Ligeti, Kriszta Véghelyi, viola; and Rezső Pertorini, cello. The quartet uses period instruments, and is named after the Festetics family, founders of the famous Helikon music library. Its repertoire includes string quartets by Josef Haydn, Wolfgang Amadeus Mozart, Ludwig van Beethoven, and Franz Schubert.

The Festetics Quartet has recorded all of the Haydn string quartets, available on CD.
