= Tasziló Festetics (Hungarian noble, born 1850) =

Hungarian nobleman

Tasziló Festetics de Tolna
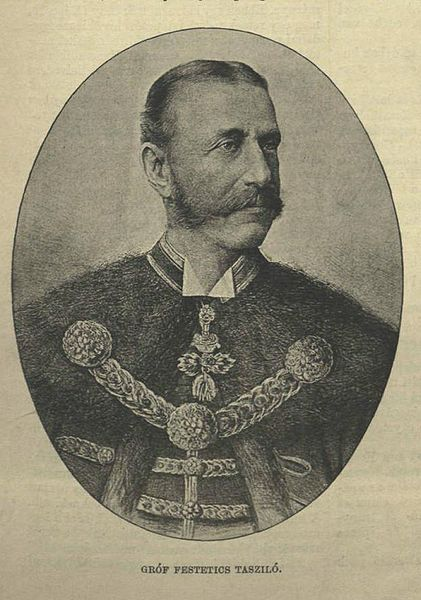
- Born: 5 May 1850; Vienna, Austrian Empire
- Died: 4 May 1933 (aged 82); Keszthely, Kingdom of Hungary
- Buried: Festetics Mausoleum
- Noble family: Festetics
- Spouse: Lady Mary Victoria Douglas-Hamilton (m. 1880; died 1922)
- Issue: Mária Matild Festetics de Tolna; György Tasziló Festetics de Tolna; Alexandra Olga Festetics de Tolna; Karola Friderika Festetics de Tolna
- Father: Count György Festetics de Tolna
- Mother: Countess Eugénia Erdődy de Monyorókerék et Monoszló

Prince Tasziló Festetics de Tolna (5 May 1850 – 4 May 1933) was a Hungarian landowner and a member of the House of Festetics.

== Early life ==
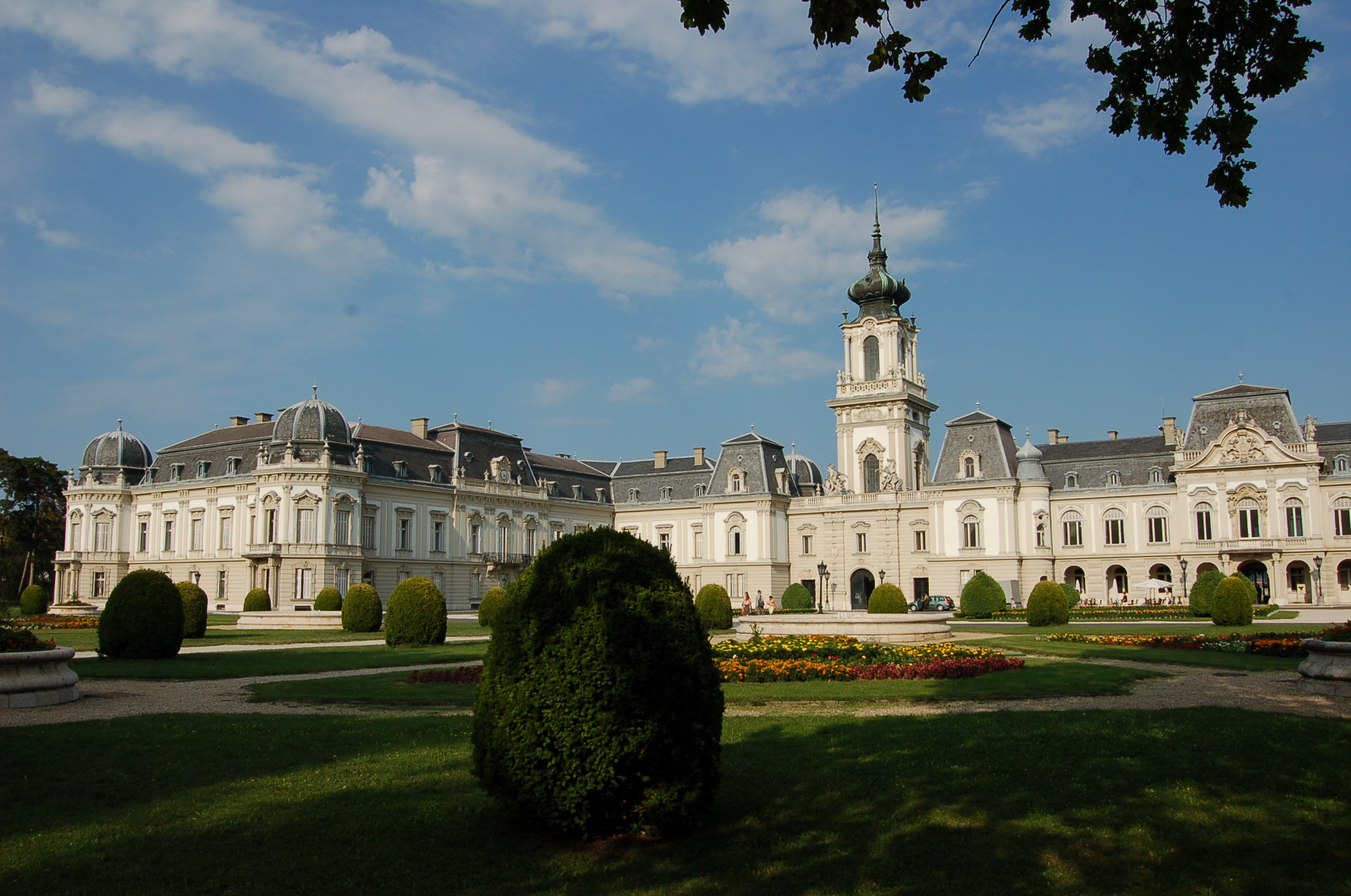
Festetics Palace

He was born in Vienna, the son of Count György Festetics de Tolna, who served as Minister of Foreign Affairs of Hungary from 1867 to 1871, and his wife, Countess Eugénia Erdõdy de Monyorókerék et Monoszló (1826-1894).

His paternal grandparents were Count Laszlo Festetics von Tolna (1785–1846) and his wife, Princess Josefine of Hohenzollern-Hechingen (1790-1856). His maternal grandparents were Count Kajetan Erdődy (1795-1856) and his wife, Countess Ernestine of Lerchenfeld-Prennberg (1798-1863).

== Career ==
On 21 June 1911 Count Tasziló Festetics de Tolna was made a Prince with the style of Serene Highness (Durchlaucht) by Emperor Francis Joseph I of Austria.

== Personal life ==
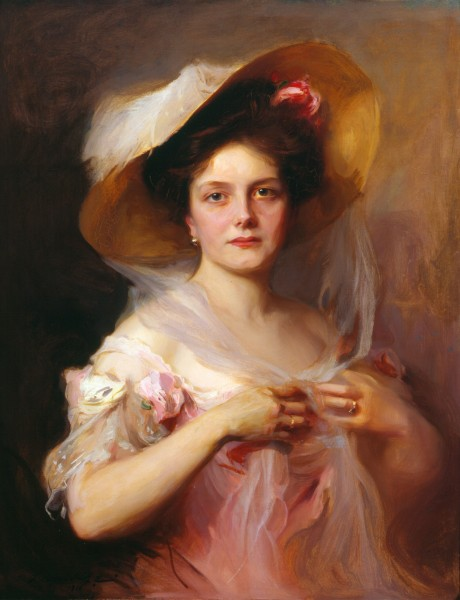
Portrait of his eldest daughter, Princess Karl-Emil von Fürstenberg, by Philip de László, 1906

In 1880, Festetics married Lady Mary Victoria Douglas-Hamilton (1850–1922), the former wife of Albert I, Prince of Monaco. Lady Mary was the only daughter of William Hamilton, 11th Duke of Hamilton and Princess Marie Amelie of Baden). From her first marriage, she was the mother of Louis II, who became the reigning Prince of Monaco on 26 June 1922. Together, the couple had four children:

- Countess Mária Mathilde Georgina Festetics de Tolna (1881–1953), who married Prince Karl-Emil von Fürstenberg, the second son of Prince Maximilian Egon I of Fürstenberg and Countess Leontine von Khevenhüller-Metsch (a daughter of the 5th Prince of Khevenhüller-Metsch).
- Prince György Tasziló József Festetics de Tolna (1882–1941), who married Countess Marie Franziska von Haugwitz.
- Countess Alexandra Olga Eugénia Festetics de Tolna (1884–1963), who was married Prince Karl von Windisch-Grätz (brother of Prince Otto of Windisch-Graetz, who married Archduchess Elisabeth Marie of Austria) and later to Prince Erwin of Hohenlohe-Waldenburg-Schillingsfürst, the second son of Prince Konrad of Hohenlohe-Schillingsfürst.
- Countess Karola Friderika Mária Festetics de Tolna (1888–1951), who married Baron Oskar Gautsch von Frankenthurn, son of Baron Paul Gautsch von Frankenthurn, Minister-President of Cisleithania.

His wife died on 14 May 1922 in Budapest. Prince Tasziló died at Festetics Palace, Keszthely, on 4 May 1933, the day before his 83rd birthday. His grandson Georg (born 1940) is the current head of the house.

=== Descendants ===
Through his eldest daughter Mária, he was a great-grandfather of Princeess Ira von Fürstenberg, Prince Egon von Fürstenberg, and Prince Karl von Schwarzenberg.

== See also ==
- Festetics family
