= Leó Festetics =

Patron of music and amateur composer

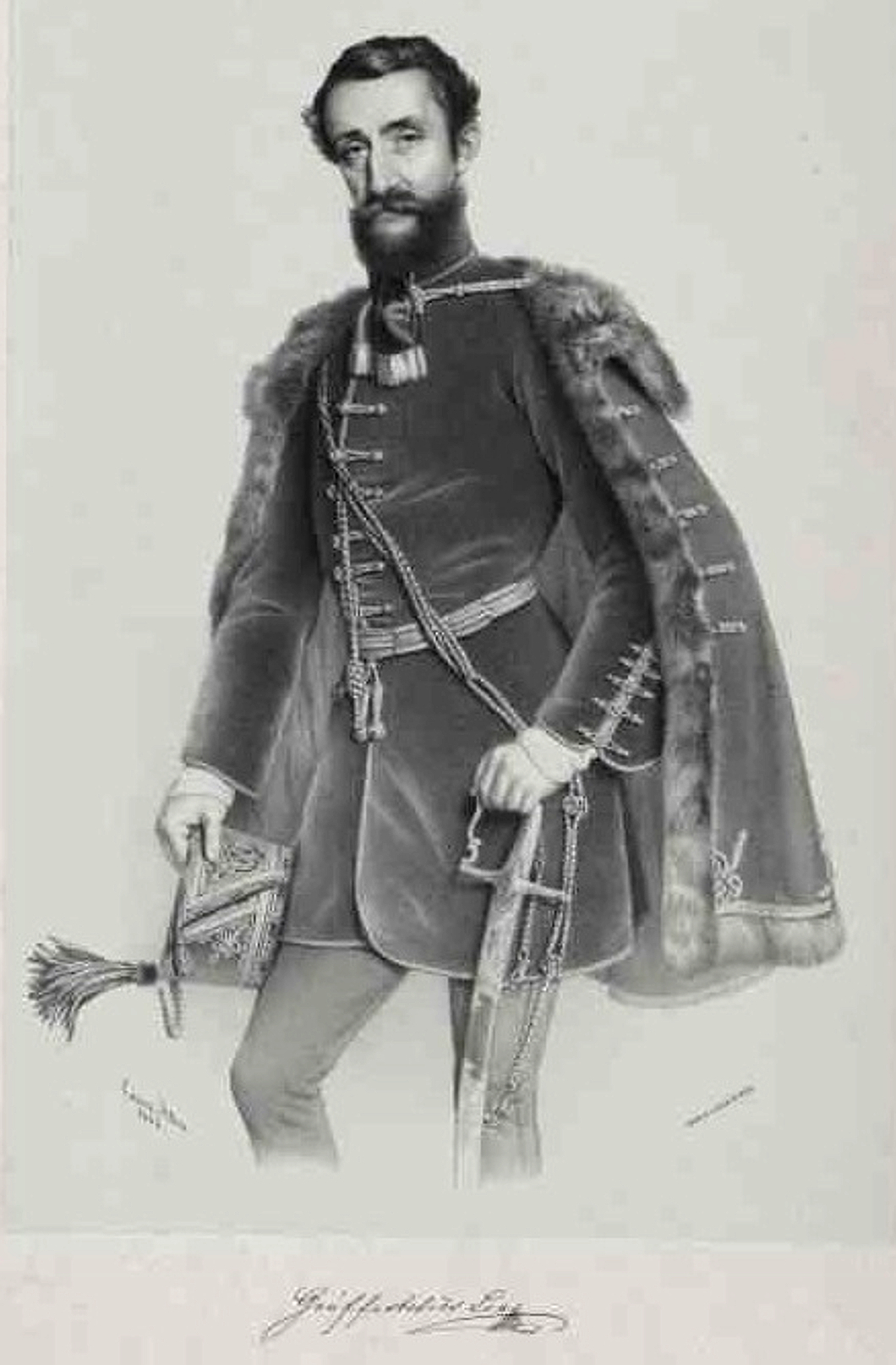
Leó Festetics (c.1855)

Count Leó Festetics de Tolna (8 October 1800, Pécs, Hungary – 15 November 1884), was a patron of music and an amateur composer, from a prominent Croatian Hungarian family, Festetics.

He was a friend and correspondent of Franz Liszt, who dedicated to him his Hungarian Rhapsody No. 13 in A minor (1847, pub. 1853). Liszt based his Spanisches Ständchen (S. 487) on a melody provided by Count Festetics. In 1856, Festetics published his designs for a theatre (British Library collection). His 1858 composition Les Noces du Pâtre was edited and "elaborated" by Liszt that same year.
