= Antal Festetics =

Antal Festetics, exactly (German: Antal-Erwin Graf Festetics von Tolna; born 12 June 1937 in Budapest, Hungary), is a Hungarian-Austrian biologist, zoologist and behavioural researcher. A student of Konrad Lorenz, in 1973 he became a university professor and director of the Institute for Hunting Biology at the University of Göttingen. In 1981 he became an honorary professor at the University of Vienna. He was awarded for the establishment of national parks in Austria and Hungary, as well as the Austrian State Prize for Environmental Protection in 1988.

== Decorations and awards ==
- 1962 and 1964 - Theodor Körner Prize for Art and Science
- 1971 - Award of the City of Vienna
- 1982 - International Nature Conservation prize of World Wide Fund for Nature
- 1982 - Grand Decoration of Burgenland
- 1987 - World Conservation Order of the Golden Ark (Netherlands)
- 1987 - Grand Gold Decoration of Styria
- 1988 - Austrian State Prize for Environmental Protection ("Konrad Lorenz Award")
- 1989 - Honorary Doctor of Agricultural Sciences Keszthely (Georgikon) the University of Pannonia, Veszprém ("Dr. agr hc")
- 1990 - Paracelsus Ring of Villach
- 1992 - Grand Gold Medal of the City of Vienna
- 1994 - Golden Lion
- 1997 - Gold Medal of Honour of Vienna
- 1997 - Platinum Romy for lifetime achievement
- 1998 - Conservation Award "Pro Natura" (Hungary)
- 1998 - Merit Cross 1st Class of the Federal Republic of Germany (Verdienstkreuz 1. Klasse)
- 2006 - Austrian Cross of Honour for Science and Art, 1st class
- 2007 - Commander's Cross of Burgenland
- European Academy of Sciences and Arts
