= Festetics Palace =

Baroque palace in Keszthely, Zala, Hungary

Coordinates: 46.7706°N 17.2417°E

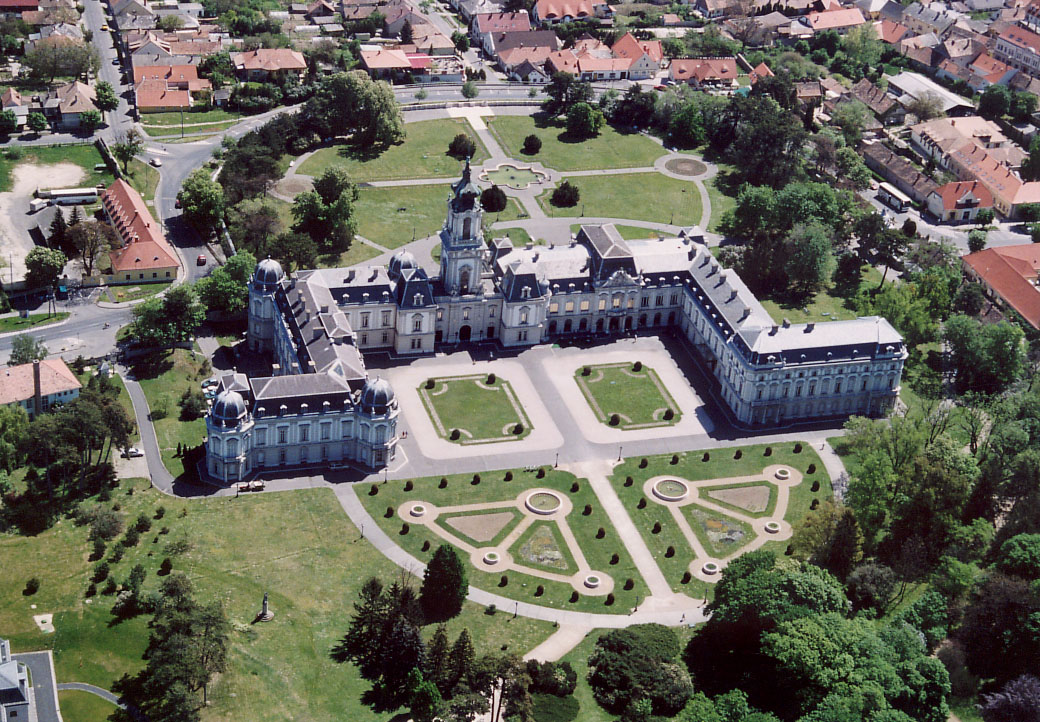
Aerial view of the Festetics Palace

The Festetics Palace is a Baroque palace located in the town of Keszthely, Zala, Hungary. The building now houses the Helikon Palace Museum.

The palace's construction, started by Kristóf Festetics in 1745, lasted more than a century. During this time, the palace, built at first on the foundations of a ruined castle, was tripled in size in two subsequent building campaigns, most recently in the 1880s, to designs by Viktor Rumpelmayer, living in Vienna.

When Rumpelmayer died in 1885, the work was carried to completion by architects Gusztáv Haas and Miksa Paschkisch. The result is one of the three largest country houses in Hungary.

== History ==
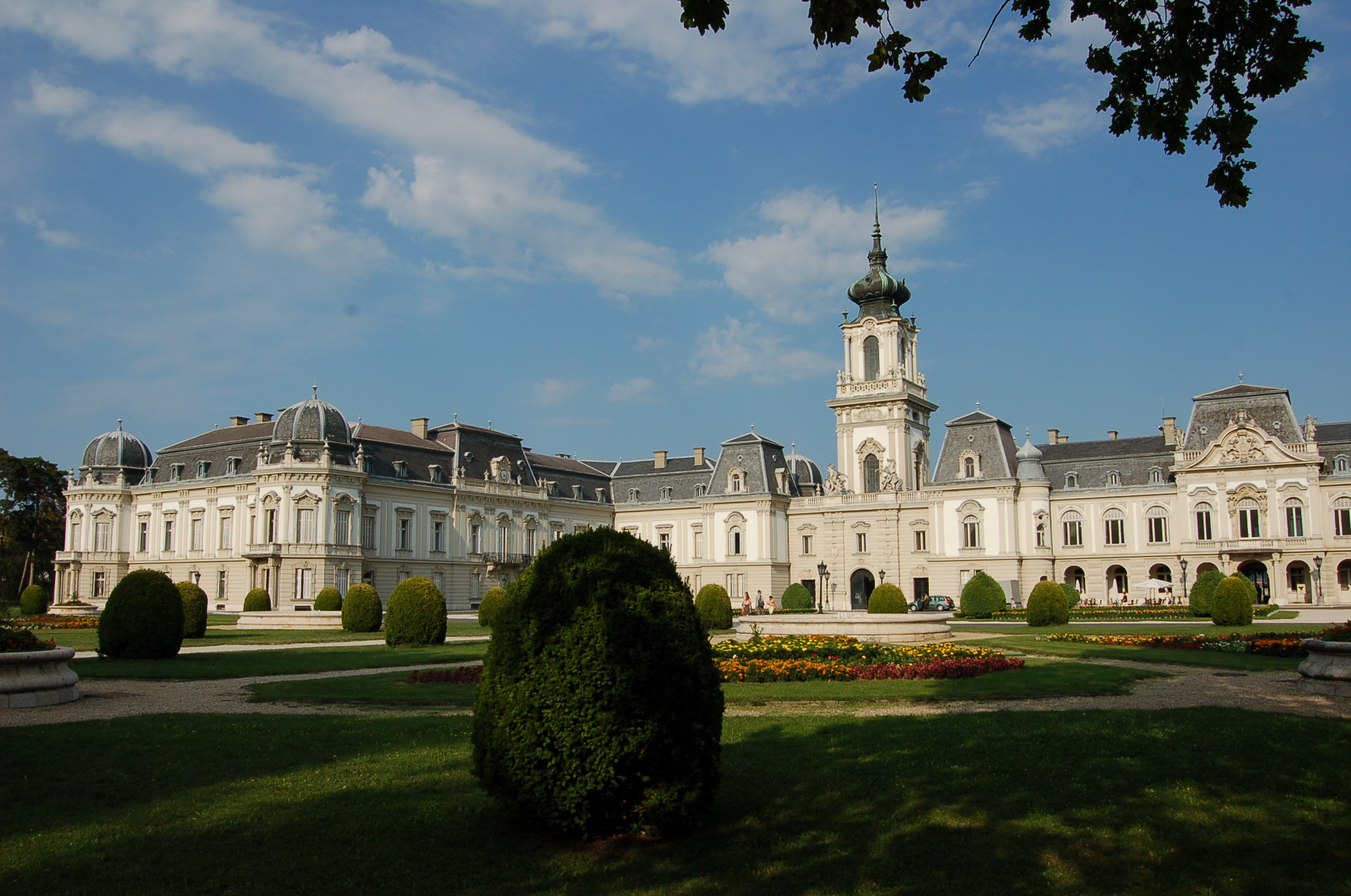
The garden front

The Counts Festetics were progressive landowners: Kristóf Festetics founded a hospital, Pál Festetics established a school in the town, and in 1797, Count György Festetics opened an agricultural college, the Georgikon, the first of its kind in Europe, which is still in operation as a faculty of the University of Pannonia.

The palace's library wing was built by Count György Festetics in 1799–1801, with guidance from András Fischer of the Vienna Academy. Execution was entrusted to local artisans. The dining room (now a concert hall) has stucco decor by Mátyás Vathner from the town of Pápa. Stonework was executed by the local mason József Zitterbart, locksmithing by a local master craftsman, József Dobrolán, tiled stoves by József Pittermann and inlaid floors and woodwork by master carpenter János Kerbl, who was also responsible for the fittings in the library.

The book collection was made available to students of the Georgikon.

In 1815 Dr Richard Bright (namesake of Bright's Disease) lived here.

The central axis of the garden front is centered on one pavilion of the corps de logis, rather than on the prominent central tower of the extension built in the 1880s, with prominent mansard roofs and richly framed dormer windows typical of the neo-Baroque French Second Empire style, and neo-Renaissance woodwork in some of the interiors. On the entrance side facing the town, the axis remains centered on the original baroque structure, now a flanking wing.

The elaborate expansion was carried out for Count Tasziló Festetics, who married Lady Mary Douglas-Hamilton (1850-1922) on 2 June 1880. He entertained Albert Edward, Prince of Wales, in October 1885 and again in 1888 during his "incognito" Hungarian visits, accompanied by his great friend the Duke of Hamilton, the brother-in-law of Festetics.

The parterres in which the palace stands were extended in the nineteenth century with a naturalistic landscape park in the English fashion.

Prince Tasziló Festetics died in possession of the palace on 4 May 1933, and unlike the surrounding area it was not damaged during the Second World War. The property continued to belong to the Festetics family until it was nationalized by the Communists in 1949.

== Recent history ==
Since 1974, the palace has housed the independent Helikon Palace Museum; it is visited by 200,000 people each year.

The great book collection remaining in the palace is the only substantial aristocratic library now surviving in Hungary. Portraits of the Festetics family, including some in tartans, are also still in the palace. The stable block now houses a collection of coaches and carriages. Open-air concerts are held in the grounds during the summer.

From November 2019 until March 2020, the palace was the main filming location for the 'Little Palace' setting of the fantasy Netflix series Shadow and Bone.

== Gallery ==
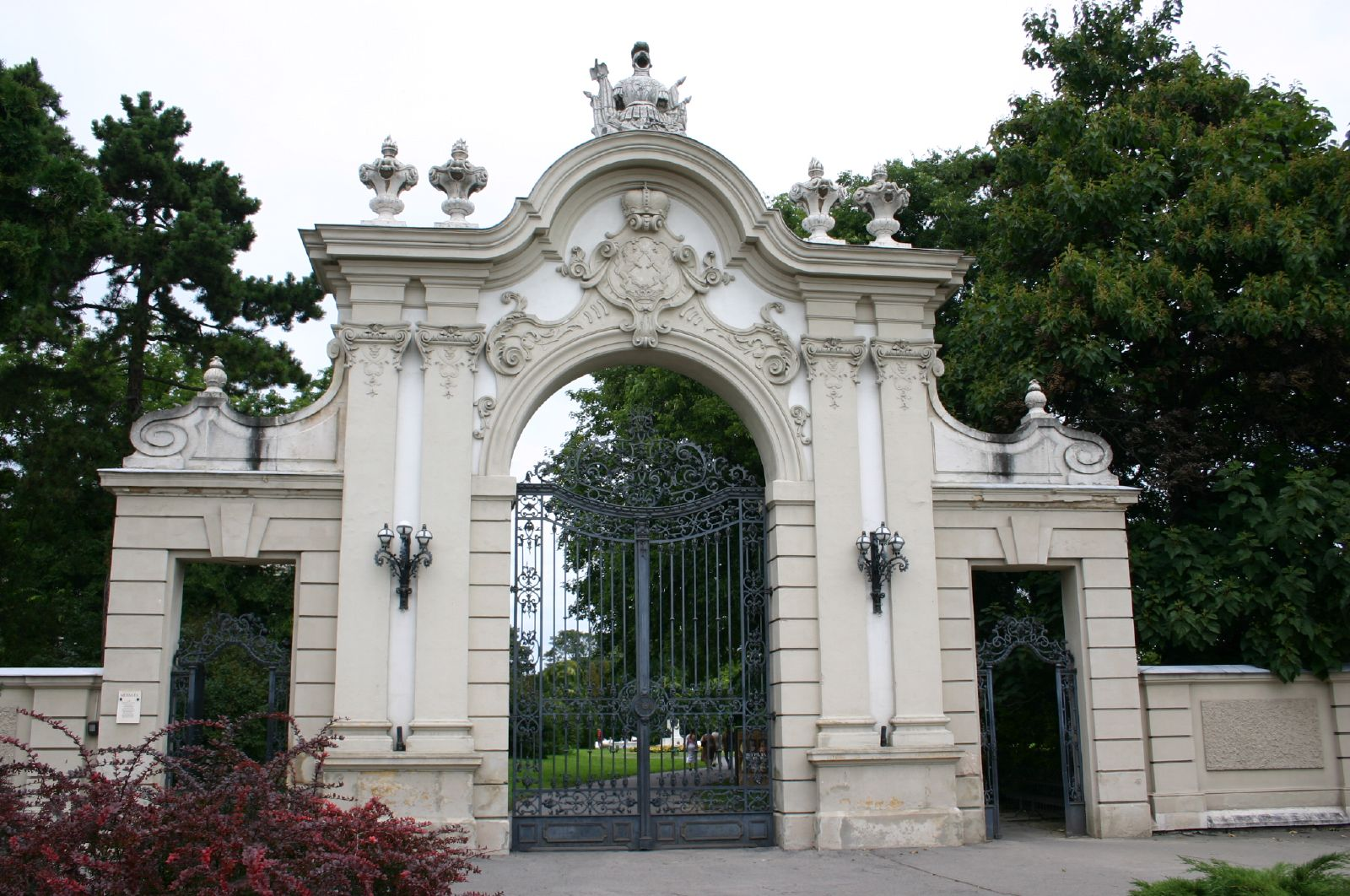
Neo-Baroque garden gateway

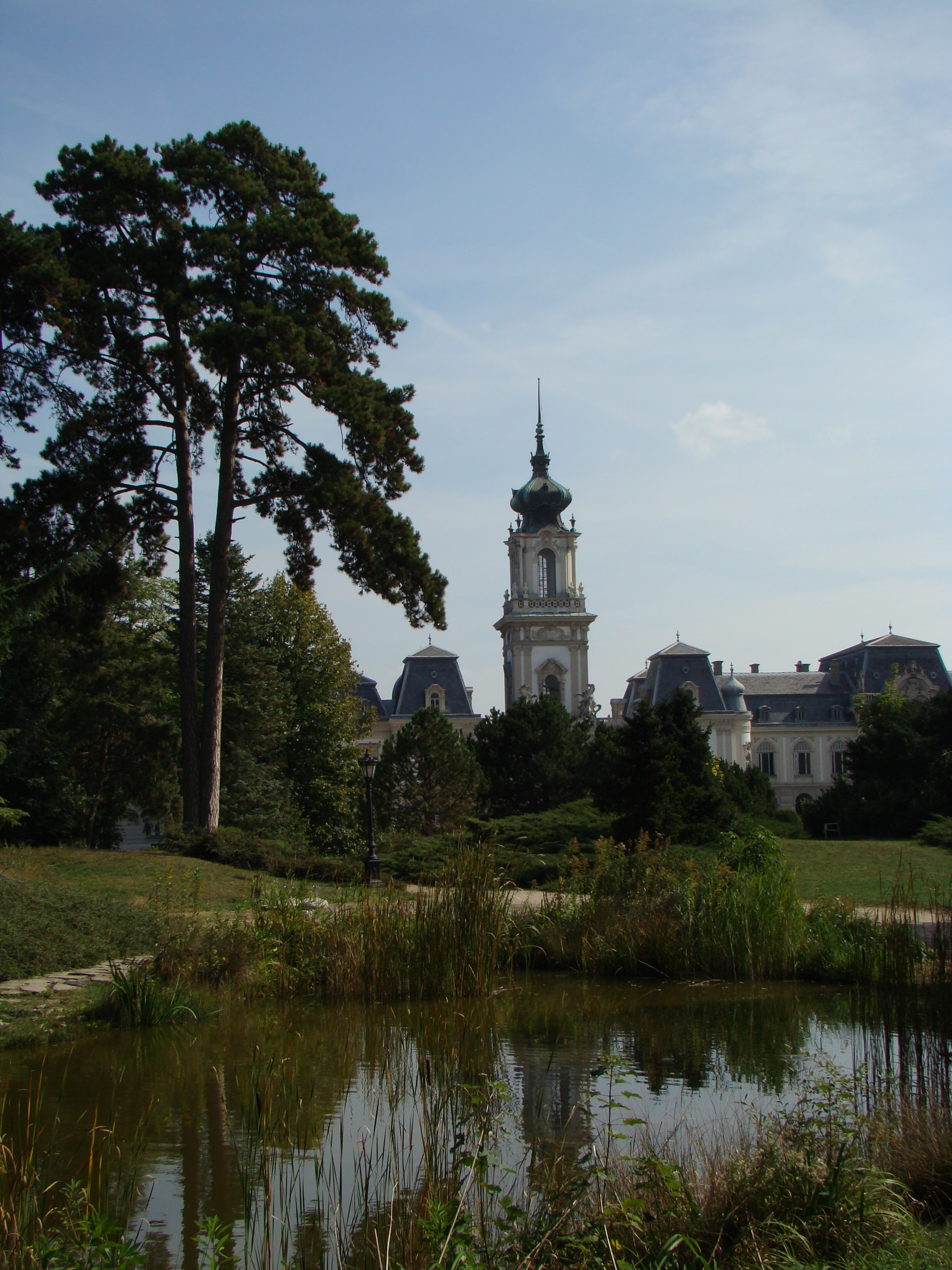
View of the garden

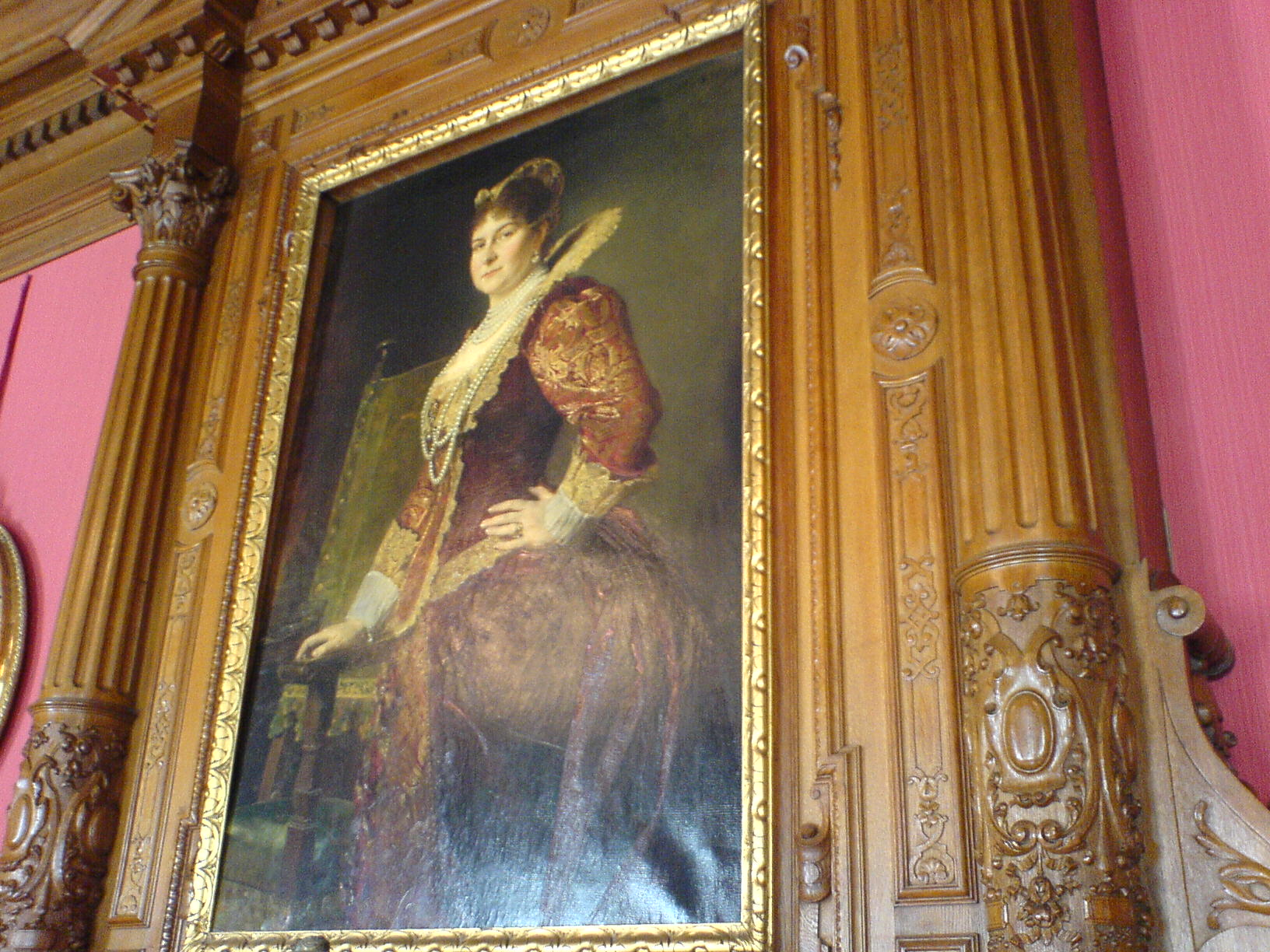
Interior of the palace

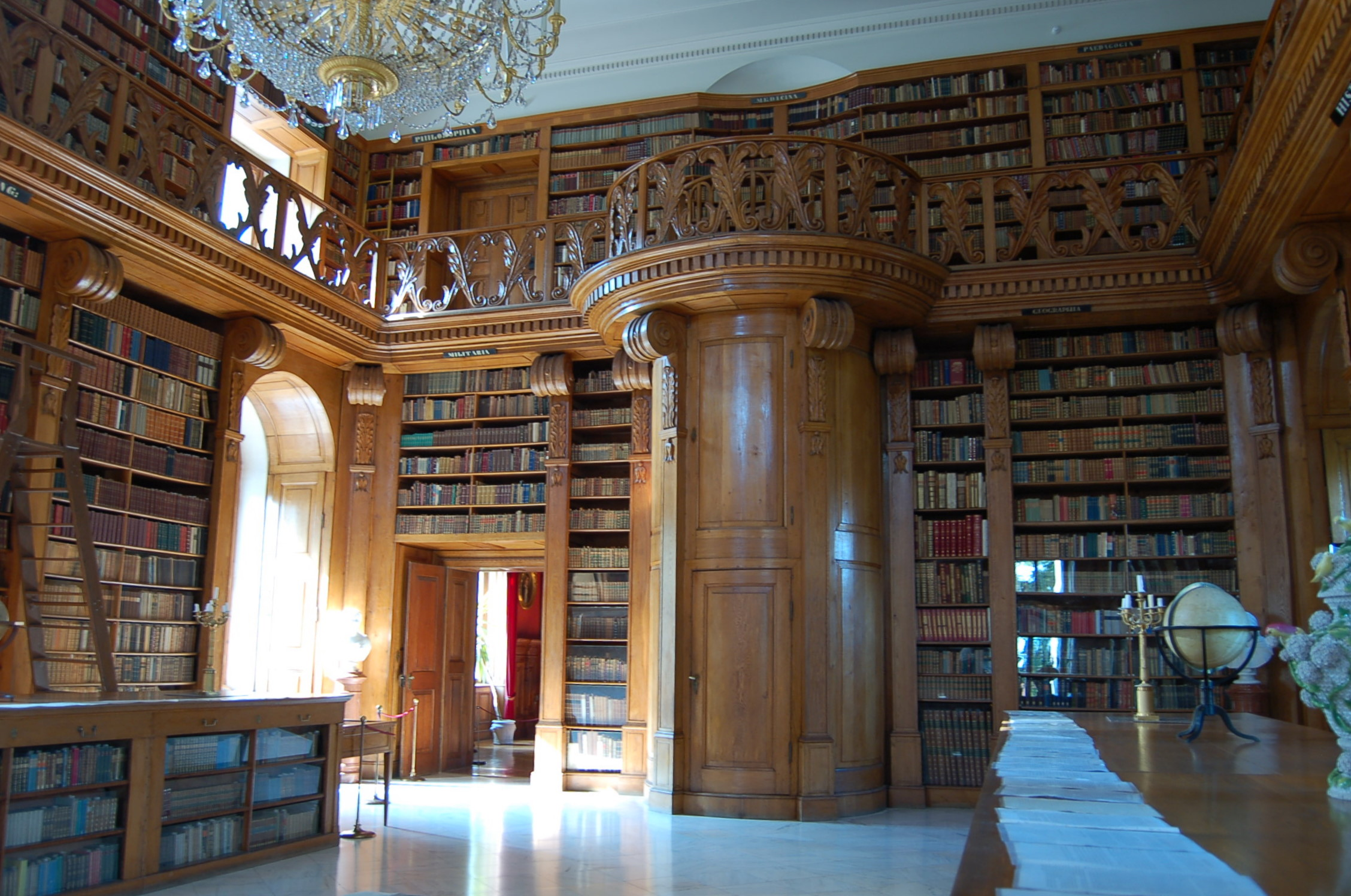
View of the library
