= D20 road (Croatia) =

Road in Croatia

D20 state road

Route information
- Length: 50.4 km (31.3 mi)

Major junctions
- From: D3 near Čakovec
- A4 in Čakovec interchange
- To: D2 in Koprivnica

Location
- Country: Croatia
- Counties: Međimurje, Koprivnica-Križevci
- Major cities: Čakovec, Koprivnica

Highway system
- Highways in Croatia

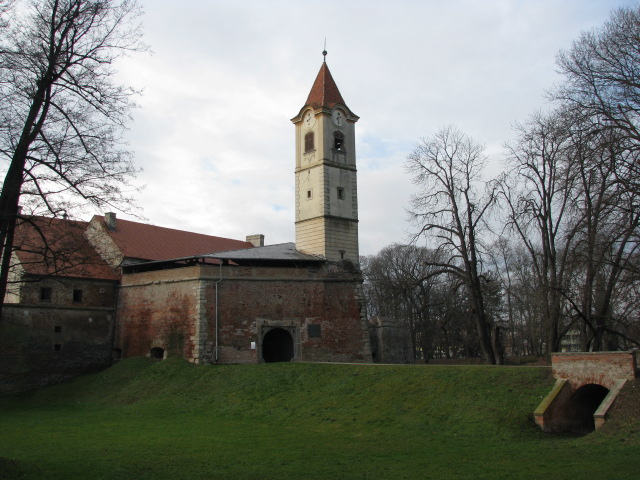
Čakovec, at the western terminus of the D20 road

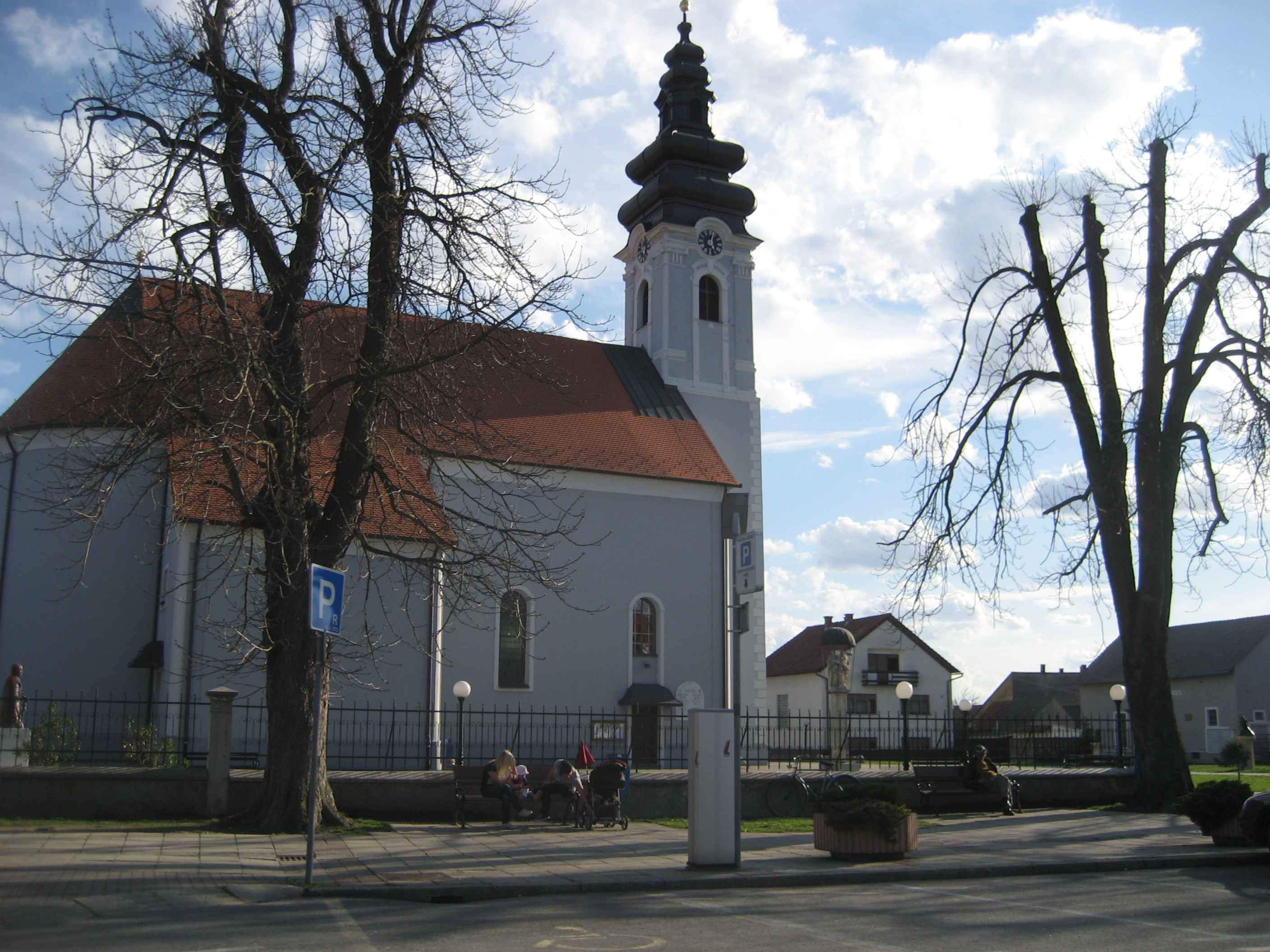
Prelog, on the D20 road route

D20 is a state road in Međimurje and Podravina regions of Croatia connecting Koprivnica to the D3 state road near Čakovec, and the road also serves as a connecting road to the A4 motorway as it forms a junction with the A4 Čakovec interchange. The road is 50.4 km (31.3 mi) long.

Like all other state roads in Croatia, the D20 is managed and maintained by Hrvatske ceste, state owned company.

== Traffic volume ==
Traffic is regularly counted and reported by Hrvatske ceste, operator of the road.

D20 traffic volume
Road	Counting site	AADT	ASDT	Notes
D20	1319 Ivanovec	5,460	6,183	Between the Ž2232 junction and Čakovec interchange (A4)
D20	1305 Prelog	3,776	3,921	Between the Ž2038 and Ž2033 junctions.

== Road junctions and populated areas ==
D20 junctions/populated areas
Type	Slip roads/Notes
	D3 to Čakovec (D209) and Varaždin (D2) (to the south) and to Goričan border crossing to Hungary (to the north). The western terminus of the road.
	Ž2022 to Mala Subotica and Orehovica.
	A4 Čakovec interchange to Varaždin and Zagreb (to the south) and to Goričan border crossing to Hungary (to the north).
	Ž2038 to Sveti Križ and Podbrest.
	Prelog; Ž2026 to Donji Kraljevec and Goričan. Ž2033 to Sveti Juraj u Trnju (D3) and Otok.
	Cirkovljan
	Draškovec; Ž2255 to Donji Kraljevec. Ž2039 to Oporovec.
	Donji Mihaljevec
	Sveta Marija
	Ž2040 to Donji Vidovec and Kotoriba.
	Donja Dubrava; Ž2041 to the Ž2040 county road.
	Drava Bridge - 175 m (574 ft) long.
	Ž2076 to Selnica Podravska, Slokovec and Sigetec Ludbreški (D2).
	Ž2081 to Zablatje, Kuzminec and Rasinja.
	Ž2078 to Legrad. The western D20/Ž2078 intersection. The Ž2078 road loops from the D20 to Legrad and back forming 2 intersections with the latter.
	Ž2078 to Legrad. The eastern D20/Ž2078 intersection.
	Đelekovec; Ž2082 to Imbriovec. Ž2260 to Drnje (D41).
	Koprivnica; D2 to Ludbreg (D24) and Varaždin (D3) (to the west) and to Virovitica (D5) and Osijek (D7) (to the east). The eastern terminus of the road.
