= Donji Vidovec =

- Municipality
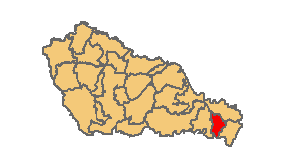
- Location within Međimurje County

- Location within Croatia
- Coordinates: 46°20′N 16°47′E
- Country: Croatia
- Region: Northern Croatia (Međimurje)
- County: Međimurje County

Government
  - Municipal mayor: Bojana Petrić (NPS)

Area
  - Municipality: 13.8 km^{2} (5.3 sq mi)
  - Urban: 13.8 km^{2} (5.3 sq mi)

Population (2021)
  - Municipality: 1,197
  - Density: 86.7/km^{2} (225/sq mi)
  - Urban: 1,197
  - Urban density: 86.7/km^{2} (225/sq mi)
- Time zone: UTC+1 (CET)
  - Summer (DST): UTC+2 (CEST)
- Postal code: 40327 Donji Vidovec
- Area code: 040
- Website: donjividovec.hr

Donji Vidovec (Hungarian: Muravid; Kajkavian: Dolnji Vidovec) is a municipality in Međimurje County, Croatia.

== History ==
Archaeological discoveries from the ancient period have been found in the area of Donji Vidovec. Donji Vidovec was the center of population of the entire eastern Međimurje region from Čukovec and Donji Mihaljevec to Legrad and Kotoriba. For a long time it was called Bistrica, which it got after the nearby stream Bistrec. It was first mentioned in 1226 as an estate named Bistrec. In 1771, Donji Vidovec had 127 houses and 744 inhabitants.

== Geography ==
The village is located in the south-eastern part of Međimurje County, and borders the municipalities of Sveta Marija, Donja Dubrava and Kotoriba. It is also close to the Drava and the outflow canal from Lake Dubrava, a reservoir on the river. The centre of Čakovec, the county seat of Međimurje County, is located around 31 kilometres from Donji Vidovec, while the town of Prelog is located around 14 kilometres from the village. Donji Vidovec also borders the Legrad municipality of Koprivnica-Križevci County and the Mali Bukovec municipality of Varaždin County.

== Demographics ==
According to the 2021 census, the Donji Vidovec municipality had a total population of 1,197. Donji Vidovec is the only village in the municipality.

Donji Vidovec: Population trends 1857–2021
v

population	1686	1774	1867	2082	2166	2301	2323	2187	2387	2306	2279	2141	1904	1756	1595	1399	1197
	1857	1869	1880	1890	1900	1910	1921	1931	1948	1953	1961	1971	1981	1991	2001	2011	2021

Sources: Croatian Bureau of Statistics publications

== Administration ==
The current mayor of Donji Vidovec is Bojana Petrić (NPS) and the Donji Vidovec Municipal Council consists of 9 seats.

Groups	Councilors per group
NPS	5 / 9
HSLS-MDS	3 / 9
HDZ	1 / 9
