= Cirkovljan =

- Village
- Location within Croatia
- Coordinates: 46°20′38″N 16°39′00″E
- Country: Croatia
- County: Međimurje County
- Municipality: Prelog

Area
  - Total: 8.1 km^{2} (3.1 sq mi)

Population (2021)
  - Total: 694
  - Density: 86/km^{2} (220/sq mi)
- Time zone: UTC+1 (CET)
  - Summer (DST): UTC+2 (CEST)
- Postal code: 40323 Prelog
- Area code: 040

Cirkovljan (Hungarian: Drávaegyház) is a village in Međimurje County, Croatia.

The village is administratively part of the wider area of the town of Prelog. It is located on the D20 state road, approximately halfway between Prelog and Draškovec. The centre of Čakovec, the county seat of Međimurje County, is located around 19 kilometres from the village. The population of Cirkovljan in the 2001 census was 819.

The village is mainly surrounded by agricultural fields and some forests. There are also two gravel pits nearby, between Cirkovljan and Lake Dubrava.
