= Marina =

Dock with moorings and facilities for yachts and small boats

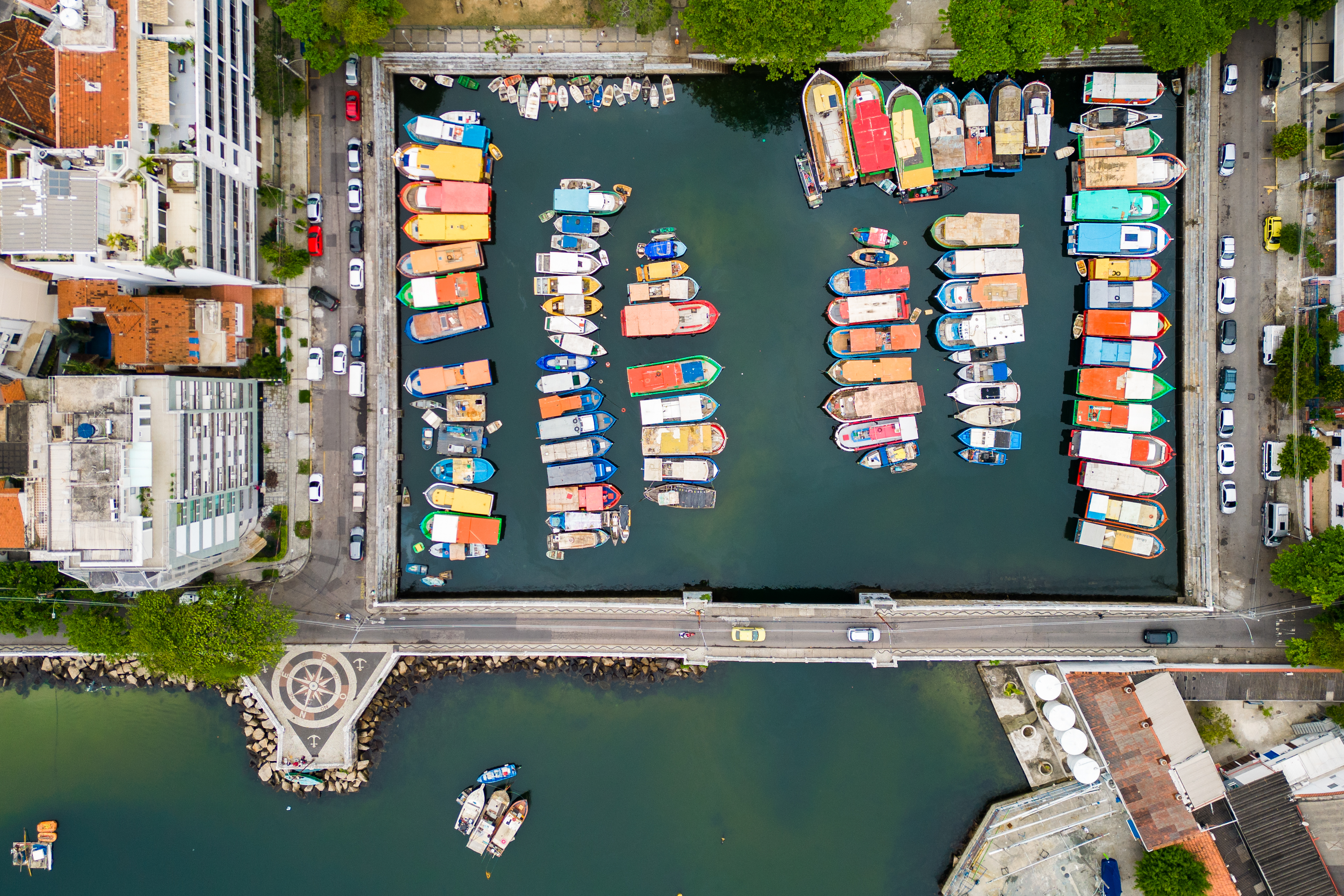
Marina on Portugal Avenue, Rio de Janeiro, Brazil

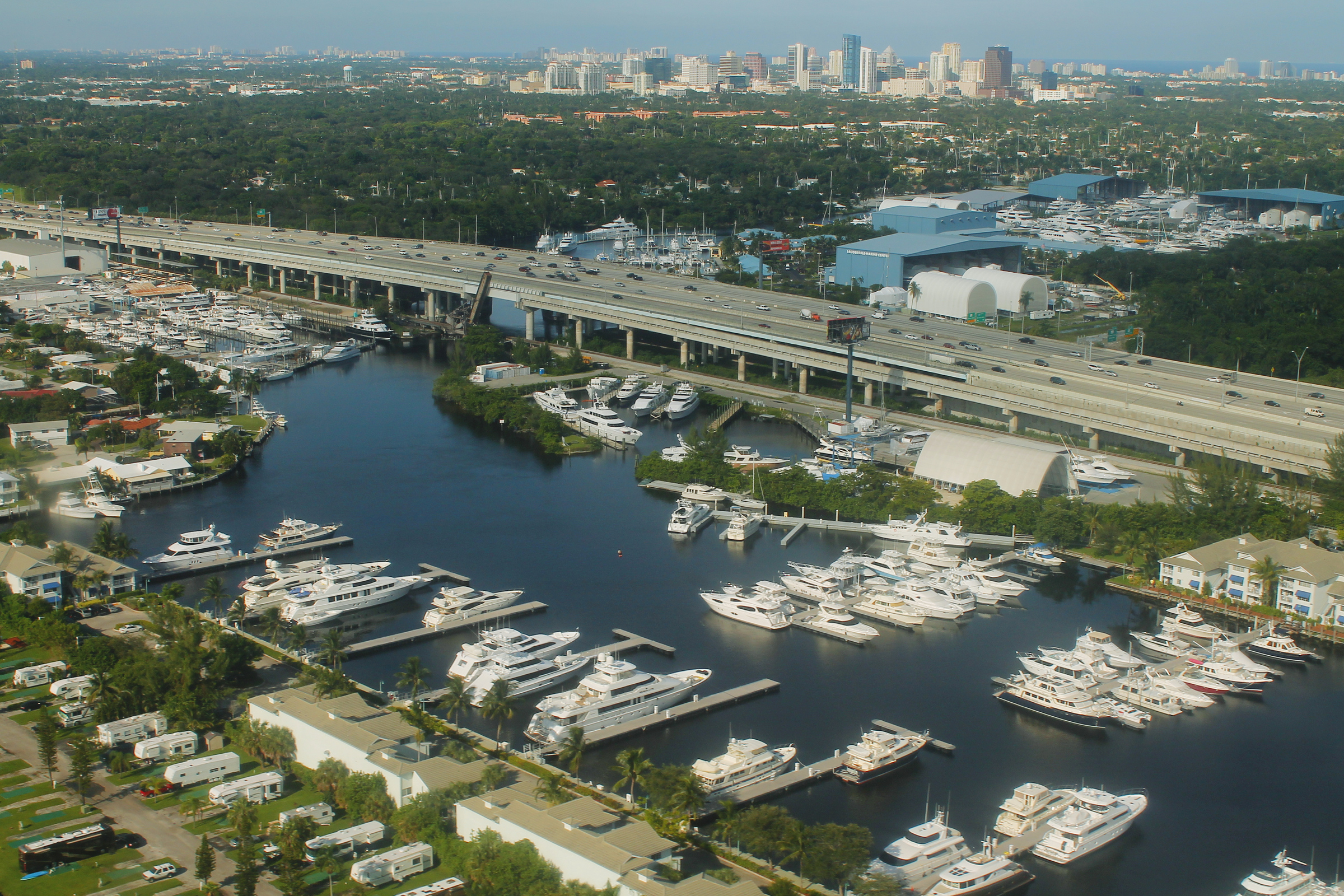
Marina in Fort Lauderdale, Florida

A marina (from Spanish [maˈɾina], Portuguese [mɐˈɾinɐ] and Italian [maˈriːna]: "related to the sea") is a dock or area of water with piers and moorings for securing and parking yachts and small boats. A marina differs from a port in that a marina is not designed to handle large passenger ships or freighters, and is often for leisure boating activities such as yachting, sailing and boat tours.

The word marina may also refer to an inland wharf on a river or canal that is used exclusively by ferries and tour boats such as canal narrowboats.

== Emplacement ==
Marinas may be located along the banks of rivers connecting to lakes or seas and may be inland. They are also located on coastal harbors (natural or man made) or coastal lagoons, either as stand alone facilities or within a port complex.

== History ==
In the 19th century, the few existing pleasure craft shared the same facilities as trading and fishing vessels. The marina appeared in the 20th century with the popularization of yachting.

== Facilities and services ==
A marina with floating docks on False Creek inlet in Vancouver, Canada

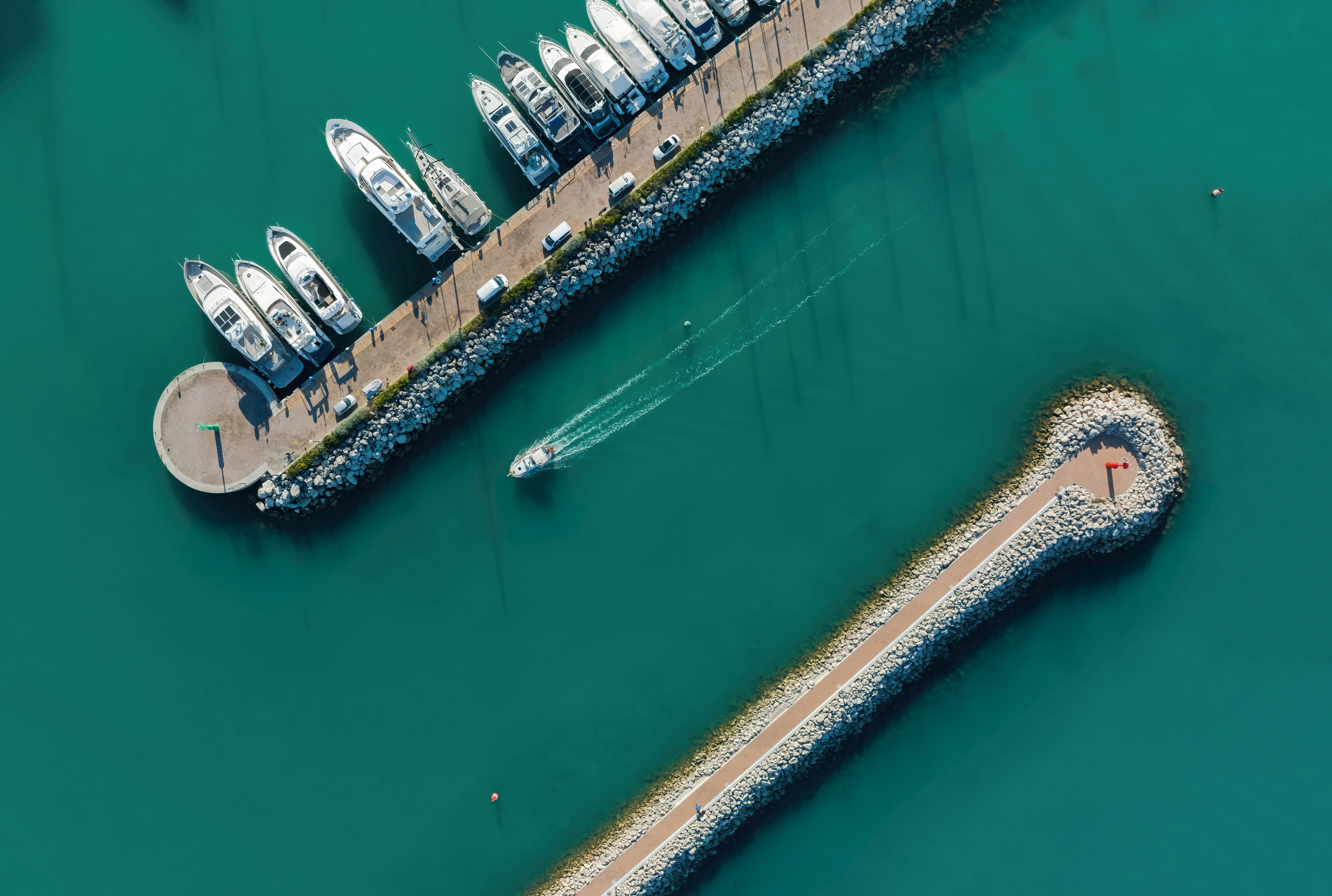
Entering to Izola Marina, Slovenia

Marina Prelog on Lake Dubrava, Croatia

A marina may have refuelling, washing and repair facilities, marine and boat chandlers, stores and restaurants. A marina may include ground facilities such as parking lots for vehicles and boat trailers. Slipways (or boat ramps) transfer a trailered boat into the water. A marina may have a travel lift, a specialised crane used for lifting heavier boats out of the water and transporting them around the hard stand. A marina may provide in- or out-of-water boat storage.

Fee-based services such as parking, use of picnic areas, pubs, and clubhouses for showers are usually included in long-term rental agreements. Visiting yachtsmen usually have the option of buying each amenity from a fixed schedule of fees; arrangements can be as wide as a single use, such as a shower, or several weeks of temporary berthing. The right to use the facilities is frequently extended at overnight or period rates to visiting yachtsmen. Since marinas are often limited by available space, it may take years on a waiting list to get a permanent berth.

== Moorings and access ==
Boats are moored on buoys, on fixed or floating walkways tied to an anchoring piling by a roller or ring mechanism (floating docks, pontoons). Buoys are cheaper to rent but less convenient than being able to walk from land to boat. Harbor shuttles (water taxis) or launches, may transfer people between the shore and boats moored on buoys. The alternative is a tender such as an inflatable boat. Facilities offering fuel, boat ramps and stores will normally have a common-use dock set aside for such short term parking needs.

Where the tidal range is large, marinas may use locks to maintain the water level for several hours before and after low water.

== Economic organisation ==
Marinas may be owned and operated by a private club, especially yacht clubs — but also as private enterprises or municipal facilities. Marinas may be standalone private businesses, components of a resort, or owned and operated by public entities.

== See also ==
- List of marinas
