= Draškovec =

- Village
- Street in Draškovec

- Location within Croatia
- Coordinates: 46°21′04″N 16°40′37″E
- Country: Croatia
- County: Međimurje County
- Municipality: Prelog

Area
  - Total: 9.4 km^{2} (3.6 sq mi)

Population (2021)
  - Total: 539
  - Density: 57/km^{2} (150/sq mi)
- Time zone: UTC+1 (CET)
  - Summer (DST): UTC+2 (CEST)
- Postal code: 40325 Draškovec
- Area code: 040

Draškovec (Hungarian: Ligetvár) is a village in Međimurje County, Croatia.

The village is part of the wider area of Prelog and is located around 5 kilometres from the town. The county seat of Međimurje County, Čakovec, is located just over 20 kilometres from the village. Draškovec is connected with the village of Hemuševec, with other nearby villages including Cirkovljan and Oporovec. It had a population of 595 in the 2011 census.

The D20 state road goes through the village.
