= Prelog =

Prelog may refer to:

- Prelog, Croatia, a town in Međimurje County in northern Croatia
- Prelog, Slovenia, a settlement in the Municipality of Domžale in Slovenia
- Prelog (surname)
- Prelog strain, an interaction in organic chemistry
