= Mladost Stadium =

Mladost Stadium may refer to:

- Mladost Stadium (Kruševac), a stadium in Kruševac, Serbia
- Mladost Stadium (Lučani), a stadium in Lučani, Serbia
- Stadion Mladost, Strumica, a stadium in Strumica, Macedonia
- Stadion SRC Mladost, Čakovec, a stadium in Čakovec, Croatia
- Sportski park Mladost, a HAŠK Mladost athletic stadium in Zagreb, Croatia
- Mladost Stadium (Prelog), a former football and speedway stadium in Croatia
