= Lake Dubrava =

- Dubravsko jezero (Croatian)
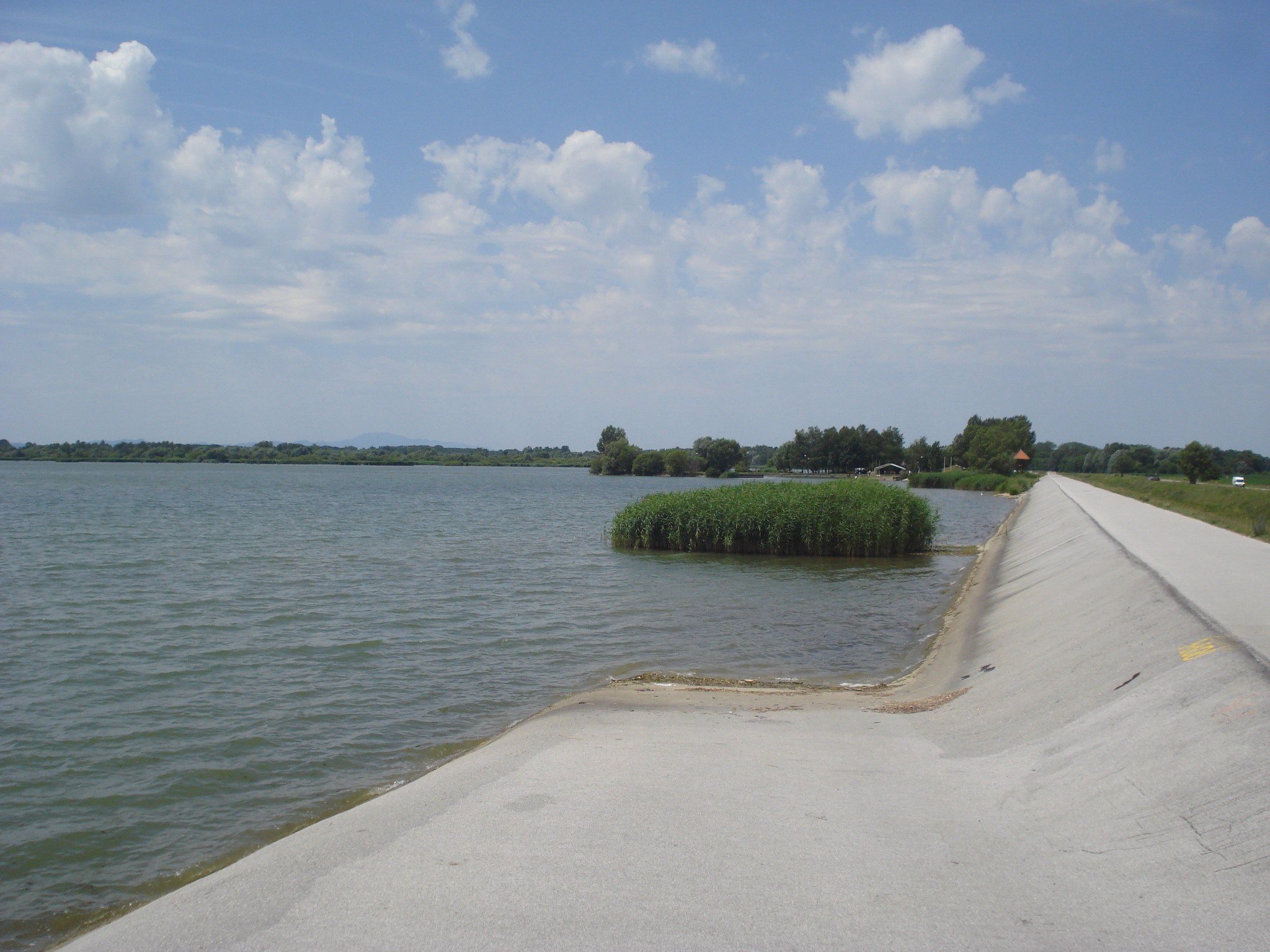
- Lake Dubrava - western part

- Location within Croatia
- Interactive map of Lake Dubrava
- Location: Međimurje County, Croatia; Varaždin County, Croatia
- Coordinates: 46°19′N 16°39′E
- Type: reservoir
- Primary inflows: Drava
- Primary outflows: Drava
- Basin countries: Croatia
- Surface area: 17.1 km^{2} (6.6 sq mi)
- Surface elevation: 138 m (453 ft)
- Settlements: Prelog

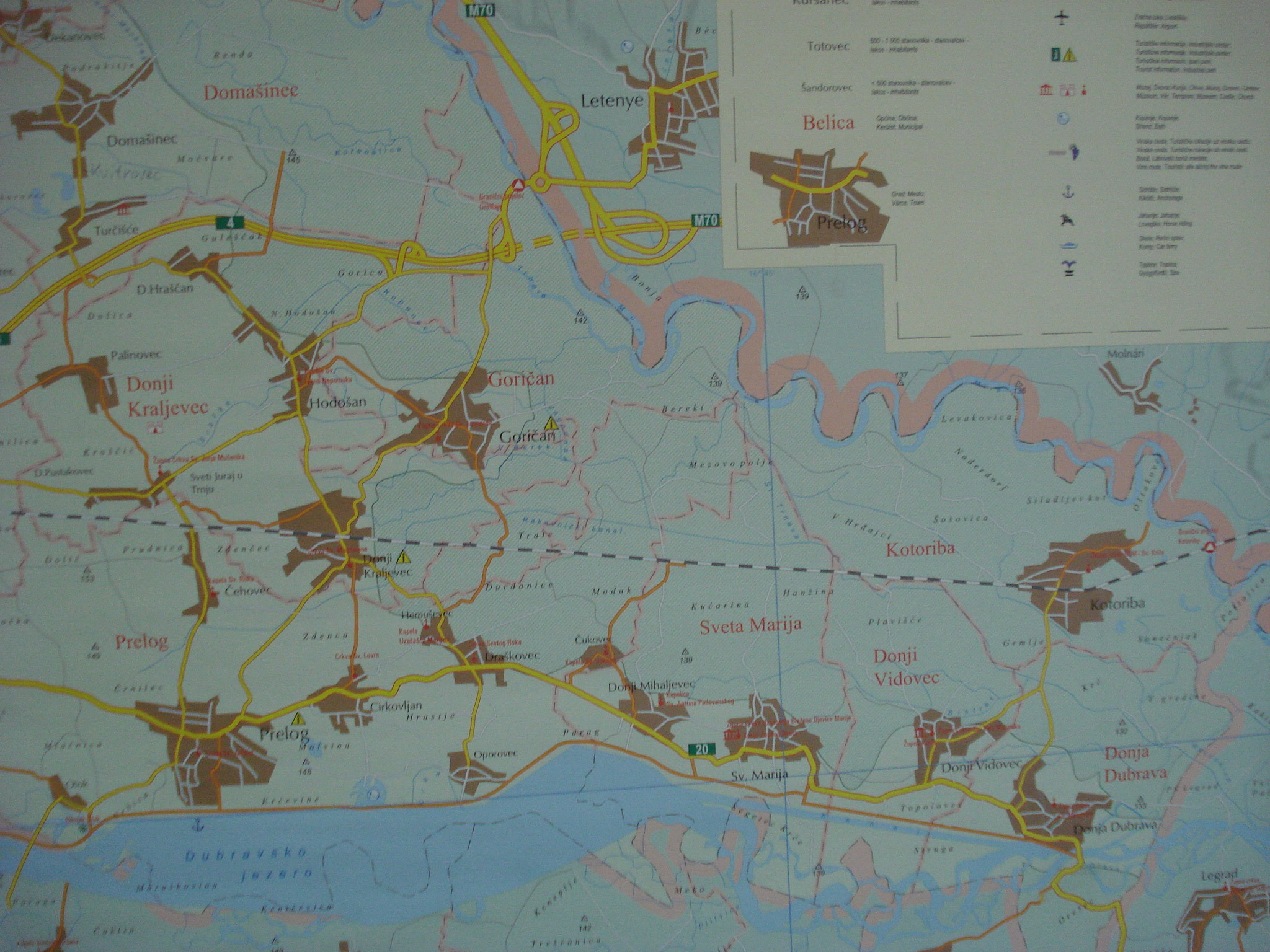
Lake Dubrava (Dubravsko jezero) shown on a map of Međimurje County (bottom left)

Lake Dubrava (Croatian: Dubravsko jezero) is a reservoir on the Drava in northern Croatia. It is administratively divided between Međimurje County and Varaždin County, and is bordered by the municipalities of Prelog, Sveti Đurđ and Veliki Bukovec. The Drava flows into the reservoir near the town of Prelog, while the dam is located near the village of Sveta Marija.

It is the largest of four reservoirs built on the Drava, the other three being Lake Ptuj in Slovenia, Lake Ormož on the Croatian-Slovenian border, and Lake Varaždin. Lakes Ormož, Varaždin and Dubrava form the Hydro North group of reservoirs and hydro power plants run by the HEP Group. Lake Dubrava serves the Dubrava Hydro Power Plant, which was built in 1989.

With an area of 17.1 km^{2}, it is the second largest lake overall in Croatia, and also the country's largest artificial lake.

The town of Prelog is the only settlement on the shores of the lake, with other nearby villages including Otok, Oporovec, Donji Mihaljevec and Sveta Marija in Međimurje County, as well as Hrženica and Struga in Varaždin County. Lake Dubrava takes its name from the village of Donja Dubrava, which is located next to the place where the lake's outflow canal meets the natural flow of the Drava, around 6 kilometres from the dam.

== Tourism ==
Lake Dubrava is a popular destination for anglers. Near the town of Prelog, there is also a small marina on the lake, with a number of log cabins and a small airfield for powered hang gliders on the shores of the Drava nearby.
