= Hrženica =

- Village
- Location within Croatia
- Coordinates: 46°17′56″N 16°34′34″E
- Country: Croatia
- County: Varaždin County
- Municipality: Sveti Đurđ

Area
  - Total: 14.8 km^{2} (5.7 sq mi)

Population (2021)
  - Total: 780
  - Density: 53/km^{2} (140/sq mi)
- Time zone: UTC+1 (CET)
  - Summer (DST): UTC+2 (CEST)
- Postal code: 42233 Sveti Đurđ
- Area code: 042

Hrženica is a village in Varaždin County, Croatia.

The village is part of the Sveti Đurđ municipality and had a population of 830 in the 2011 census. It is located in the north-eastern part of Varaždin County, near the Drava and Lake Dubrava.

The centre of Varaždin, the county seat of Varaždin County, is located around 22 kilometres from the village. The closest towns include Ludbreg in Varaždin County and Prelog in Međimurje County, both of which are located around 6 kilometres from the village.
