= Vularija =

- Village
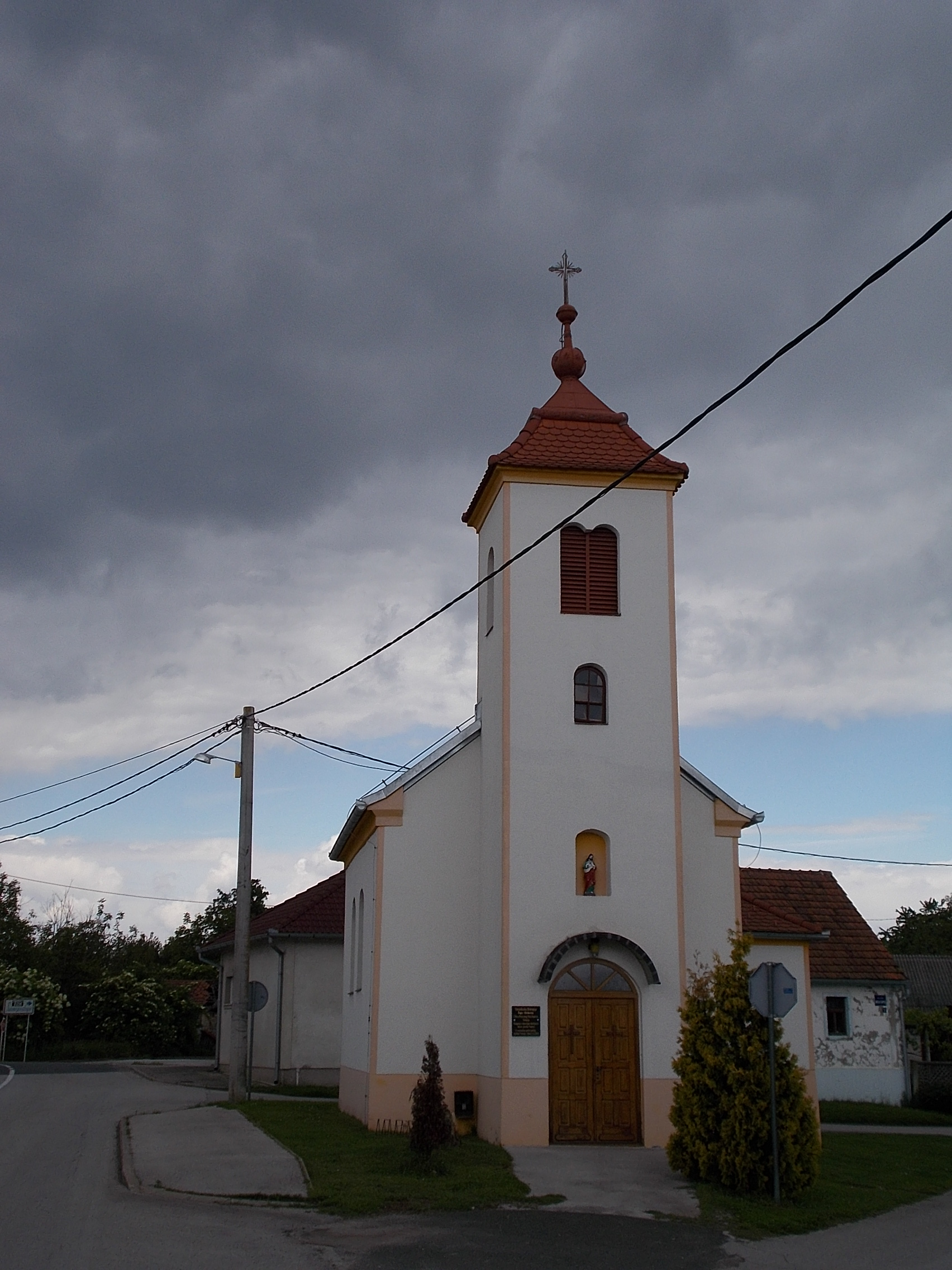
- Chapel of the Sacred Heart of Jesus in Vularija

- Location within Croatia
- Coordinates: 46°19′42″N 16°28′40″E
- Country: Croatia
- County: Međimurje County
- Municipality: Orehovica

Area
  - Total: 4.2 km^{2} (1.6 sq mi)

Population (2021)
  - Total: 363
  - Density: 86/km^{2} (220/sq mi)
- Time zone: UTC+1 (CET)
  - Summer (DST): UTC+2 (CEST)
- Postal code: 40322 Orehovica

Vularija is a village in the municipality of Orehovica, Croatia.

== Demographics ==
In 2021, Vularija had 363 residents.

Vularija: Population trends 1857–2021
v

population	203	222	249	314	296	382	434	516	639	699	655	573	544	530	412	398	363
	1857	1869	1880	1890	1900	1910	1921	1931	1948	1953	1961	1971	1981	1991	2001	2011	2021

Sources: Croatian Bureau of Statistics publications
