= Antolovec =

Settlement in Koprivnica-Križevci County, Croatia

- settlement
- Interactive map of Antolovec
- Location within Croatia
- Coordinates: 46°16′00″N 16°10′27″E
- Country: Croatia
- County: Koprivnica-Križevci
- Municipality: Legrad

Area
  - Total: 1.2 km^{2} (0.46 sq mi)

Population (2021)
  - Total: 52
  - Density: 43/km^{2} (110/sq mi)
- Time zone: UTC+1 (CET)
  - Summer (DST): UTC+2 (CEST)
- Postal code: 48316 Đelekovec

Antolovec is a settlement in the Municipality of Legrad in Croatia. In 2021, its population was 52.

== Demographics ==
Antolovec: Population trends 1857–2021
v

population	160	166	150	176	203	217	226	232	240	235	207	211	151	123	93	75	52
	1857	1869	1880	1890	1900	1910	1921	1931	1948	1953	1961	1971	1981	1991	2001	2011	2021

Sources: Croatian Bureau of Statistics publications
