= Orehovica, Međimurje County =

Orehovica
- Municipality
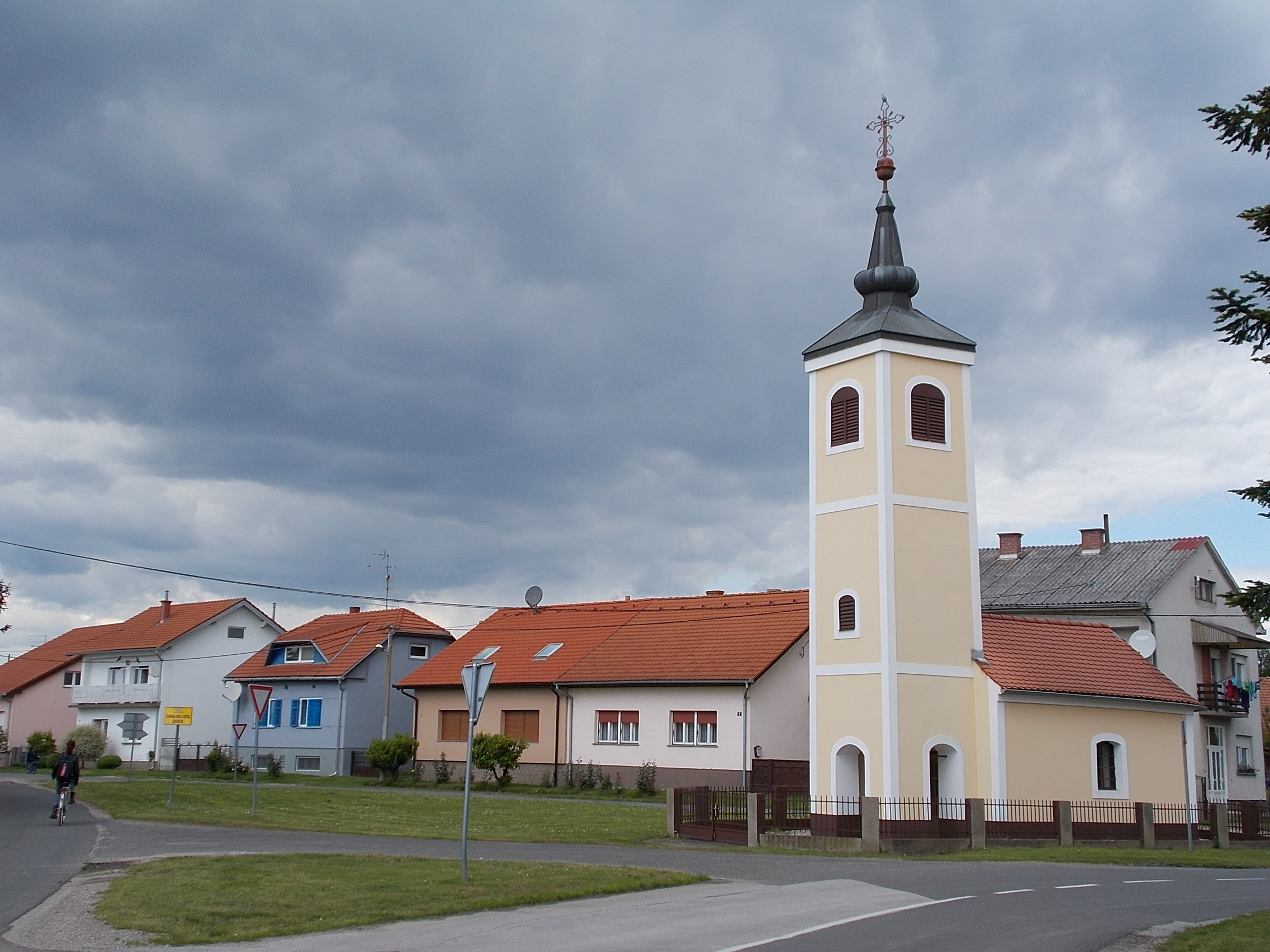
- Center of Orehovica
- Interactive map of Orehovica
- Location within Croatia
- Coordinates: 46°19′48″N 16°30′36″E
- Country: Croatia
- Region: Northern Croatia (Međimurje)
- County: Međimurje County

Government
  - Municipal mayor: Ladislav Požgaj (HDZ)

Area
  - Municipality: 21.6 km^{2} (8.3 sq mi)
  - Urban: 10.9 km^{2} (4.2 sq mi)

Population (2021)
  - Municipality: 2,720
  - Density: 126/km^{2} (326/sq mi)
  - Urban: 1,803
  - Urban density: 165/km^{2} (428/sq mi)
- Time zone: UTC+1 (CET)
  - Summer (DST): UTC+2 (CEST)
- Postal code: 40322 Orehovica
- Area code: 040
- Website: orehovica.hr

Orehovica (Hungarian: Drávadiós) is a village and municipality in Međimurje County, Croatia. There are three villages in the municipality – Orehovica, Podbrest and Vularija.

== Name ==
The name Orehovica is derived from oreh (English: walnut) in the Kajkavian dialect of Croatian, which is spoken in Međimurje County.

== History ==
The area of Orehovica was first mentioned in 1232 as the estate of Vezmić which was located along the Drava River. During the Hungarian administration from 1861 to 1918, Orehovica became the center of a municipality that also included Podbrest, Vularija, and Sveti Križ.

In the Kingdom of Serbs, Croats and Slovenes, the municipality of Orehovica was abolished and annexed to the municipality of Mala Subotica, but was re-established during the Hungarian occupation of Međimurje from 1941 to 1945. It was abolished again during Socialist Yugoslavia and re-established in 1997.

May 21st is the Day of the Orehovica Municipality, because on that day in 1997, the first Orehovica Municipal Council, since Croatia became independent, was constituted.

== Geography ==
Orehovica is located in the southern part of Međimurje County. It borders the City of Čakovec to the west, the City of Prelog to the east, Mala Subotica to the north and Varaždin County to the south.

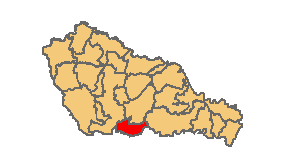
Location of Orehovica within Međimurje County

== Demographics ==
In the 2021 census, the municipality had a population of 2,720 in the following settlements:

- Orehovica, population 1,803
- Podbrest, population 554
- Vularija, population 363

64.6% of residents identified themselves as Croats, while Romani people made up 33.68% of the population.

Orehovica: Population trends 1857–2021
v

population	1179	1220	1589	1696	1469	1891	2204	2415	2840	3038	2919	2929	2941	3038	2769	2685	2720
	1857	1869	1880	1890	1900	1910	1921	1931	1948	1953	1961	1971	1981	1991	2001	2011	2021

Sources: Croatian Bureau of Statistics publications

== Administration ==
The current mayor of Orehovica is Ladislav Požgaj (HDZ) and the Orehovica Municipal Council consists of 13 seats.

Groups	Councilors per group
HNS	4 / 13
HDZ	4 / 13
NPS-SDP-SU-HSS	3 / 13
Independents	2 / 13

=== Language ===
In November 2023, the Government of the Republic of Croatia decided to declare mandatory Romanian bilingualism in Orehovica on the basis of the 2021 census, which showed the Bayash population fraction had risen above the required one third, at 33.68%. As of 2023, none of the legal requirements for the fulfillment of bilingual standards have been carried out, nor are there public legal and administrative employees proficient in the language.

== Culture ==
There are 13 associations currently operating in Orehovica:

- VFD Orehovica
- VFD Podbrest
- VFD Vularija
- Pensioners' Club Orehovica
- Cultural and art society “Fijolica” Orehovica
- FC “Budućnost” Podbrest
- FC “Croatia” Orehovica
- Association of Wireless Systems Users of the Municipality of Orehovica
- Paintball Club
- Association "Sport for All"
- Society "Our Children" of the Municipality of Orehovica
- Women's Association “Brest” Podbrest
- Youth Association Podbrest

== Gallery ==
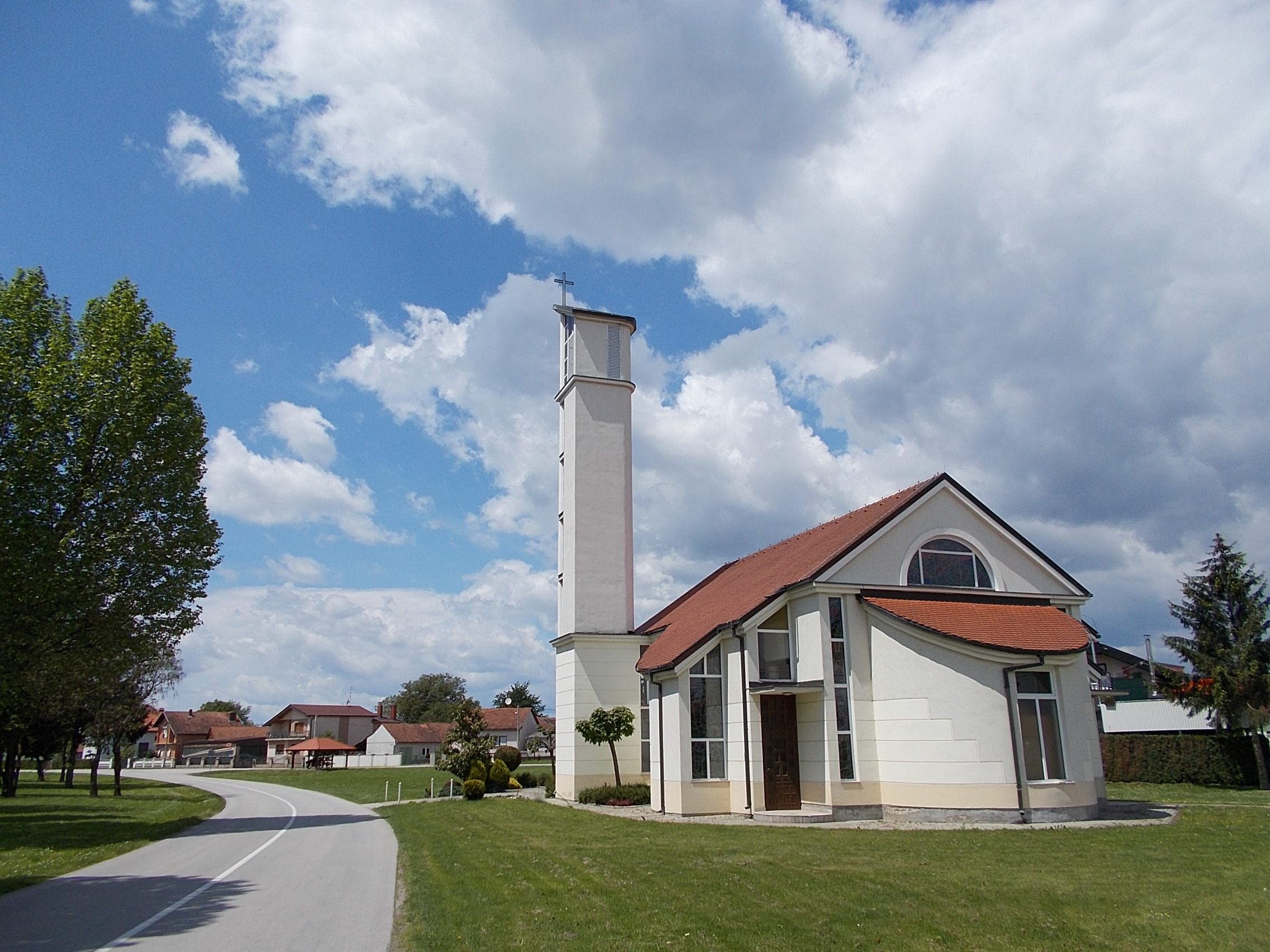
Church in Podbrest

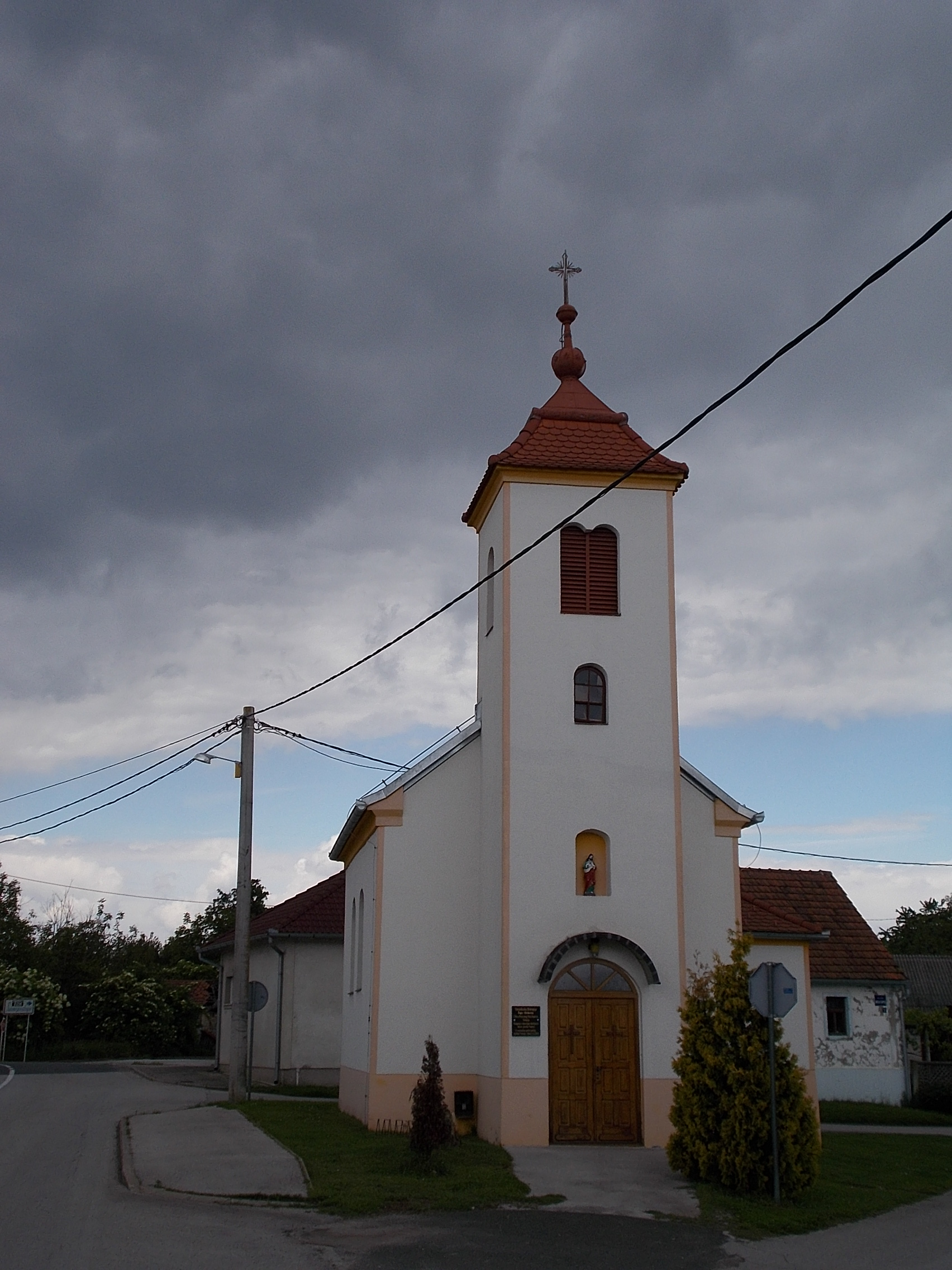
Chapel in the village of Vularija

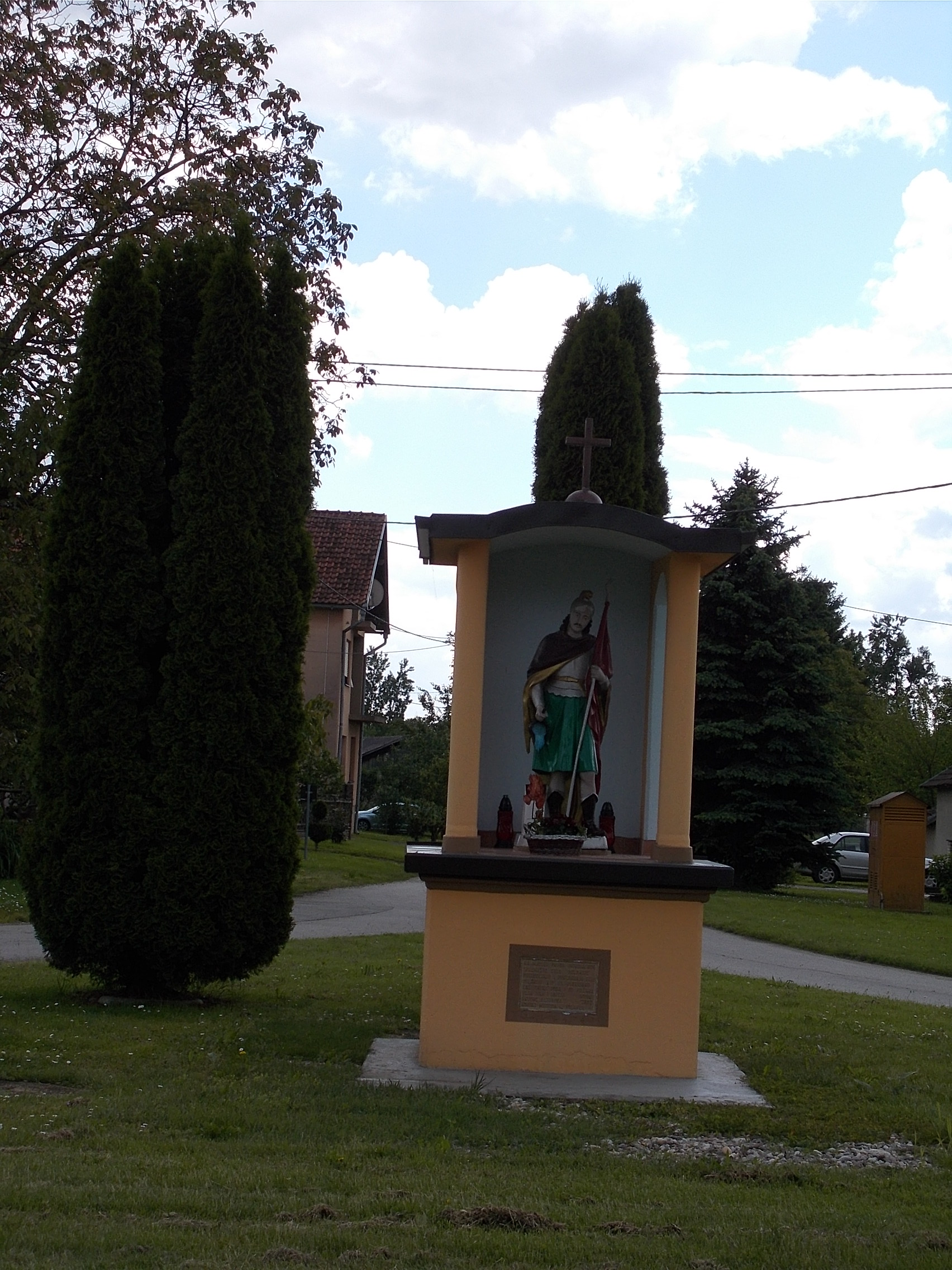
St. Florian statue
