= Mladost Stadium (Prelog) =

Former stadium in Prelog, Croatia

- Location: Sajmišna ul. 32, 40323, Prelog, Croatia
- Coordinates: 46°19′58″N 16°36′56″E
- Opened: 1964
- Closed: 2012
- Length: 342 m (0.213 mi)

Mladost Stadium was a multi-use stadium in Prelog, Croatia. It was located in the centre of Prelog at Sajmišna ul. 32. It was used by the NK Mladost Prelog football club and the Prelog Speedway Club.

== History ==
On 15 May 1964, the SC Prelog speedway club organised the first official speedway competition at this stadium. Over the following years, Prelog gained the name 'speedway city'.

The stadium was a significant venue for motorcycle speedway and hosted important events. These included qualifying rounds of the Speedway World Team Cup in 1972, 1978 and 1996, qualifying rounds of the Speedway World Championship in 1973 and 1980, and the Speedway World Pairs Championship in 1974 and 1981.

The track record with a time of 62.2 seconds was set by Nikola Martinec on 2 September 2007 and the last speedway competition was held in 2008 before the stadium closed.

In the summer of 2009, corners of the football field were added but in 2012, the earth embankments around the track and the stands were demolished, and two new football pitches, rotated in relation to the previous one, were built on the site of the former stadium. The opening of the new fields took place on 25 July 2014.
