= Selnica Podravska =

- Village
- Location within Croatia
- Coordinates: 46°18′N 16°47′E
- Country: Croatia
- County: Koprivnica-Križevci County
- Municipality: Legrad

Area
  - Total: 6.9 km^{2} (2.7 sq mi)

Population (2021)
  - Total: 254
  - Density: 37/km^{2} (95/sq mi)
- Time zone: UTC+1 (CET)
  - Summer (DST): UTC+2 (CEST)

Selnica Podravska is a village in Croatia.
