= Sveti Đurđ =

- Municipality
- Location of Sveti Đurđ in Croatia
- Coordinates: 46°17′04″N 16°36′15″E
- Country: Croatia
- County: Varaždin County

Government
  - Municipal mayor: Josip Jany

Area
  - Municipality: 45.9 km^{2} (17.7 sq mi)
  - Urban: 4.1 km^{2} (1.6 sq mi)

Population (2021)
  - Municipality: 3,326
  - Density: 72.5/km^{2} (188/sq mi)
  - Urban: 556
  - Urban density: 140/km^{2} (350/sq mi)
- Time zone: UTC+1 (CET)
  - Summer (DST): UTC+2 (CEST)
- Postal code: 42233 Sveti Đurđ
- Area code: +385 (0)42
- Website: sveti-djurdj.hr

Sveti Đurđ is a village and municipality in Croatia in Varaždin County.

According to the 2011 census, there are 3,804 inhabitants, in the following settlements:

- Hrženica, population 830
- Karlovec Ludbreški, population 591
- Komarnica Ludbreška, population 180
- Luka Ludbreška, population 255
- Obrankovec, population 113
- Priles, population 230
- Sesvete Ludbreške, population 492
- Struga, population 461
- Sveti Đurđ, population 652

The absolute majority of inhabitants are Croats. The municipality was established in 1993.
