= Prelog (surname) =

Prelog is a Croatian and Slovenian surname. Notable people with the surname include:

- Matej Prelog (born 1980), Slovenian rower
- Vladimir Prelog, Croatian chemist, 1975 Nobel Prize laureate
