= Zablatje =

Coordinates: 46°16′N 16°49′E

- Village
- Interactive map of Zablatje
- Country: Croatia
- County: Koprivnica-Križevci
- Municipality: Legrad

Area
  - Total: 4.5 km^{2} (1.7 sq mi)

Population (2021)
  - Total: 171
  - Density: 38/km^{2} (98/sq mi)
- Time zone: UTC+1 (CET)
  - Summer (DST): UTC+2 (CEST)

Zablatje is a village in Croatia.
