= Podbrest =

- Village
- Location within Croatia
- Coordinates: 46°19′52″N 16°32′42″E
- Country: Croatia
- County: Međimurje County
- Municipality: Orehovica

Area
  - Total: 6.4 km^{2} (2.5 sq mi)

Population (2021)
  - Total: 554
  - Density: 87/km^{2} (220/sq mi)
- Time zone: UTC+1 (CET)
  - Summer (DST): UTC+2 (CEST)
- Postal code: 40322 Orehovica

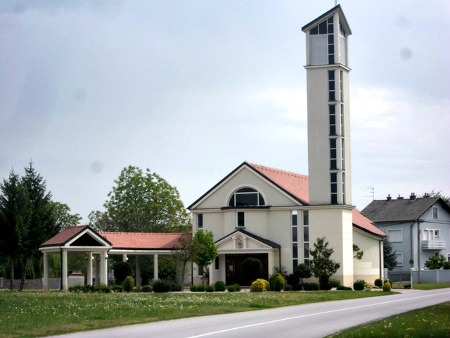
Church of Our Lady Queen of Heaven in Podbrest

Podbrest (Hungarian: Drávaszilas) is a village in Croatia.
