= Otok, Međimurje County =

Otok
- Village

- Location within Croatia
- Coordinates: 46°19′52″N 16°34′59″E
- Country: Croatia
- County: Međimurje County
- Municipality: Prelog

Area
  - Total: 6.4 km^{2} (2.5 sq mi)

Population (2021)
  - Total: 303
  - Density: 47/km^{2} (120/sq mi)
- Time zone: UTC+1 (CET)
  - Summer (DST): UTC+2 (CEST)
- Postal code: 40323 Prelog
- Area code: 040

Otok (Hungarian: Ottok) is a village in Međimurje County, Croatia.

The village is located around 2 kilometres east of the town of Prelog, and is administratively part of its wider area (municipality). The Drava flows into Lake Dubrava just outside the village. In the 2011 census, the village had a population of 335.

In a 1226 charter, an estate named Otok was mentioned as being located near Prelog. The local chapel was built in 1926.
