= Oporovec =

- Village
- Location within Croatia
- Coordinates: 46°19′55″N 16°40′30″E
- Country: Croatia
- County: Međimurje County
- Municipality: Prelog

Area
  - Total: 5.8 km^{2} (2.2 sq mi)

Population (2021)
  - Total: 334
  - Density: 58/km^{2} (150/sq mi)
- Time zone: UTC+1 (CET)
  - Summer (DST): UTC+2 (CEST)
- Postal code: 40325 Draškovec
- Area code: 040

Oporovec (Hungarian: Drávafüred) is a village in Međimurje County, Croatia.

The village is located in the southern part of the county, just over 20 kilometres from the county seat, Čakovec. Close to the village is Lake Dubrava, a reservoir on the Drava. Oporovec is administratively part of the Prelog municipality and is located just over 5 kilometres east of the town of Prelog. The population of the village in the 2011 census was 425.

== History ==
The name Oporovec was first mentioned as a toponym in 1245 and comes from the name of a nobleman, Opor. The local chapel was built in 1898 and named after Our Lady of Lourdes.

In 1478, the village was listed as Oporowecz in the list of settlements belonging to the Čakovec area. By the beginning of the 20th century, it was predominantly populated by Croats. The village was part of the Prelog district (Hungarian: Perlaki járás) of Zala County in the Kingdom of Hungary until the Treaty of Trianon was signed in 1920.

After that, it was part of the Kingdom of Yugoslavia until 1941, when the entire Međimurje region was annexed to Hungary. After World War II, it became part of Croatia within the Federal People's Republic of Yugoslavia.

The population of the village was constantly over 700 in the censuses between 1910 and 1953. However, in the censuses between 1961 and 1991, it was constantly decreasing and eventually dropped to 393 in the latter, which took place shortly before Croatia became an independent nation later that year. In the 2001 census, however, the population grew to 425.
