= Legrad =

- Municipality
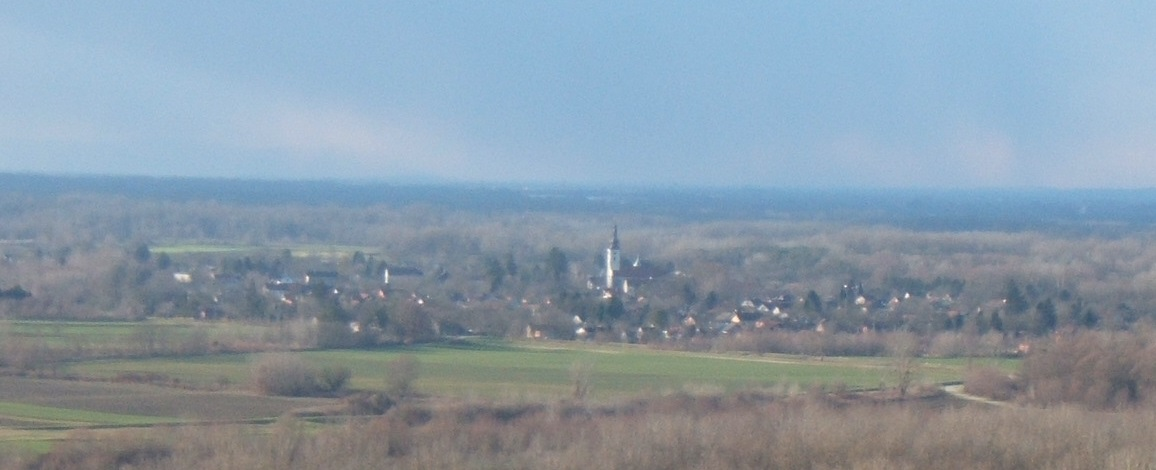
- Interactive map of Legrad
- Location of Legrad in Croatia
- Coordinates: 46°18′N 16°51′E
- Country: Croatia
- County: Koprivnica-Križevci County

Government
  - Mayor: Ivan Sabolić (SDP)

Area
  - Municipality: 62.2 km^{2} (24.0 sq mi)
  - Urban: 33.5 km^{2} (12.9 sq mi)

Population (2021)
  - Municipality: 1,916
  - Density: 30.8/km^{2} (79.8/sq mi)
  - Urban: 862
  - Urban density: 25.7/km^{2} (66.6/sq mi)
- Time zone: UTC+1 (CET)
  - Summer (DST): UTC+2 (CEST)
- Postal code: 48316 Đelekovec
- Area code: +385 (0)48
- Website: opcinalegrad.hr

Legrad (pronounced [lěɡrad]) is a village and a municipality in northern Croatia, located north of Koprivnica and east of Ludbreg in the Koprivnica–Križevci County.

In the 2021 census, there were a total of 1,916 inhabitants in the municipality. The absolute majority of the population were Croats, at 94.57%, with the largest minority being Romani, at 2.14%. Beside the Roman Catholic majority, there are Hungarian and Croatian Lutherans that have a tradition beginning in the 16th century.

== History ==
Due to its favorable geographical position, Legrad became a chartered market town as early as 1488. Since the mid-16th century, fortifications have been built to protect the town from Ottoman incursions. By the 17th century, Legrad was a major trading post for cattle which attracted merchants from Venice and Italy. The highly profitable cattle trade, run by the Zrinski family, was used to finance their standing army and the defense against the Ottomans. The development of trade and handcrafting contributed to the demographic growth, and in 1771 Legrad and neighboring villages were recorded as having as many as 6,039 inhabitants. Cattle fairs in Legrad held their relevance into the 18th and 19th centuries.

Legrad got a railway station on the other side of the river Drava in Hungary in the second half of the 19th century and that the name of this train station was Légrád until a few years ago (see: Serbian-Hungarian Baranya-Baja Republic).

It is historically very important that Novi Zrin was near Legrad.

In the late 19th century and early 20th century, Legrad was part of the Zala County of the Kingdom of Hungary.

== Demographics ==
In 2021, the municipality had 1,916 residents in the following 7 settlements:

- Antolovec, population 52
- Kutnjak, population 220
- Legrad, population 862
- Mali Otok, population 115
- Selnica Podravska, population 254
- Veliki Otok, population 242
- Zablatje, population 171
Legrad: Population trends 1857–2021
v

population	4438	5147	4974	5489	5629	5678	5891	5724	5701	5611	5268	4549	3746	3200	2764	2241	1916
	1857	1869	1880	1890	1900	1910	1921	1931	1948	1953	1961	1971	1981	1991	2001	2011	2021

Sources: Croatian Bureau of Statistics publications

== Administration ==
The current mayor of Legrad is Ivan Sabolić (SDP) and the Legrad Municipal Council consists of 9 seats.

Groups	Councilors per group
SDP	6 / 9
HDZ	2 / 9
Ivan Gerendaj	1 / 9
