= Donji Mihaljevec =

- Village
- Location within Croatia
- Coordinates: 46°20′N 16°43′E
- Country: Croatia
- County: Međimurje County
- Municipality: Sveta Marija

Area
  - Total: 8.9 km^{2} (3.4 sq mi)

Population (2021)
  - Total: 616
  - Density: 69/km^{2} (180/sq mi)
- Time zone: UTC+1 (CET)
  - Summer (DST): UTC+2 (CEST)

Donji Mihaljevec is a village in Croatia. It is connected by the D20 highway.
