= Donja Dubrava, Međimurje County =

Donja Dubrava
- Municipality
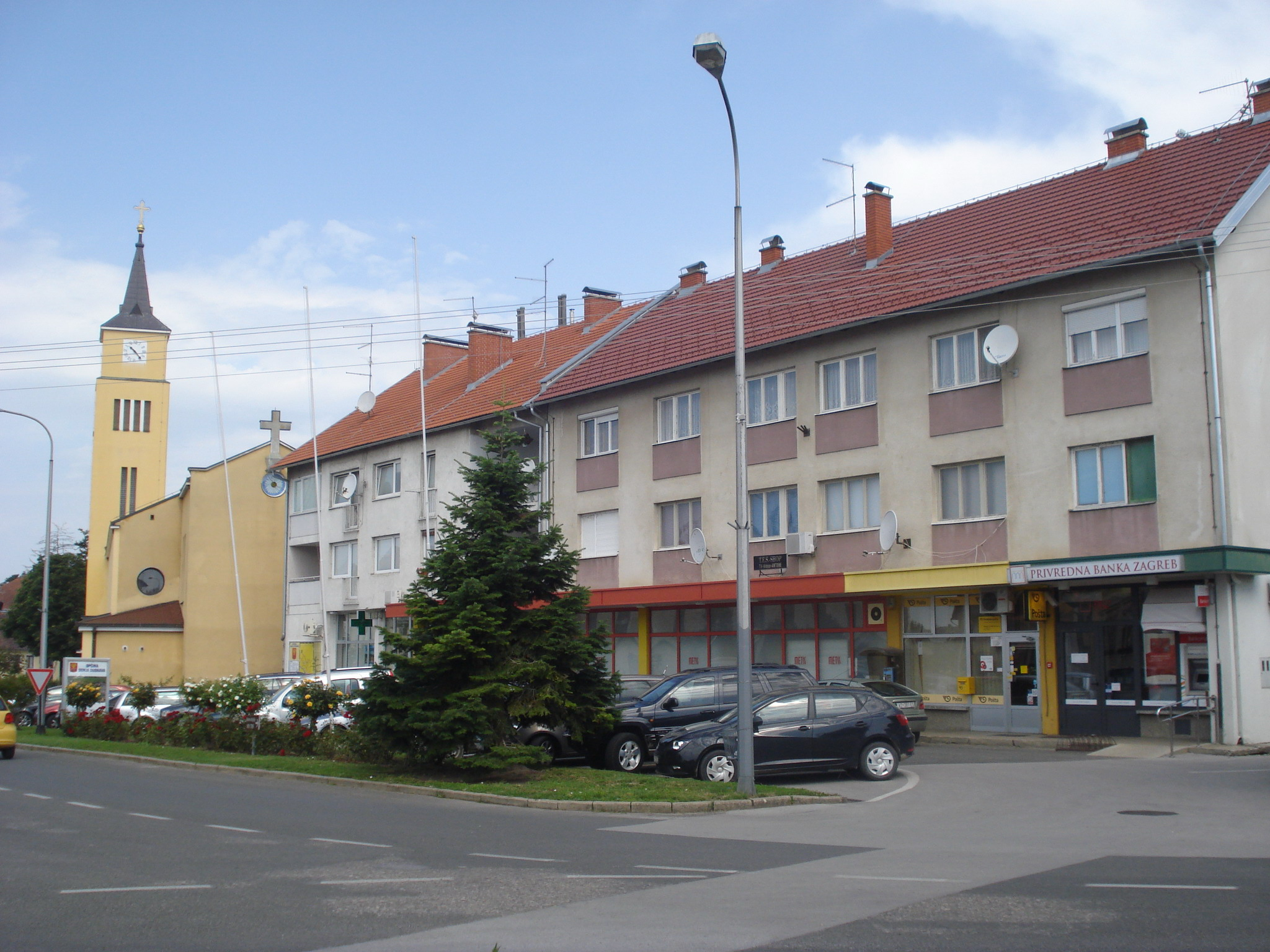
- Buildings in village centre

- Location within Croatia
- Coordinates: 46°19′N 16°49′E
- Country: Croatia
- Region: Northern Croatia (Međimurje)
- County: Međimurje County

Government
  - Municipal mayor: Damir Vidović (HSLS)

Area
  - Municipality: 19.0 km^{2} (7.3 sq mi)
  - Urban: 19.0 km^{2} (7.3 sq mi)

Population (2021)
  - Municipality: 1,658
  - Density: 87.3/km^{2} (226/sq mi)
  - Urban: 1,658
  - Urban density: 87.3/km^{2} (226/sq mi)
- Time zone: UTC+1 (CET)
  - Summer (DST): UTC+2 (CEST)
- Postal code: 40328 Donja Dubrava
- Website: donjadubrava.hr

Donja Dubrava (Hungarian: Alsódomboru; Kajkavian: Dolnja Dobrava) is a village and municipality in Međimurje County, Croatia.

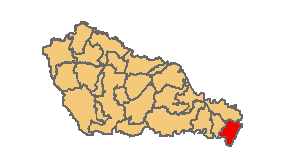
Location within Međimurje County

== History ==
Donja Dubrava got its name from the word dubrava, which means forest. In the mid-18th century, the locals built the Church of St. Margaret on the site of the previous wooden one, but it was destroyed in the earthquakes of 1827 and 1880. The current church was completed in 1940 and is located in the very center of the village. The Ujlaki-Hirschler company, founded in 1828, contributed the most to the economic development of Donja Dubrava. At the end of the 19th century, there was a clinic, a pharmacy, a casino and a number of guild associations in Donja Dubrava.

After the invasion of Yugoslavia by the Axis powers, Hungary occupied Međimurje, including Donja Dubrava. On April 2, 1945, Donja Dubrava was liberated from Hungarian occupation.

== Geography ==
The village of Donja Dubrava is located on the shores of the Drava river, at the confluence of the outflow canal from the artificial Lake Dubrava into the natural flow of the Drava. Lake Dubrava, the largest artificial lake in Croatia, and the hydroelectric power plant it is used for are named after the village. The confluence of the Mura into the Drava is also very close to the village, just over 5 kilometers to the south-east. A road bridge connecting Međimurje with Podravina is just outside the village.

== Demographics ==
According to the 2021 census, the Donja Dubrava municipality had a total population of 1,658. Donja Dubrava is the only village in the municipality.

Donja Dubrava: Population trends 1857–2021
v

population	2602	2855	2907	3341	3508	3734	3428	3395	3441	3250	3090	2980	2719	2536	2274	1920	1658
	1857	1869	1880	1890	1900	1910	1921	1931	1948	1953	1961	1971	1981	1991	2001	2011	2021

Sources: Croatian Bureau of Statistics publications

== Administration ==
The current mayor of Donja Dubrava is Damir Vidović (HSLS) and the Donja Dubrava Municipal Council consists of 9 seats.

Groups	Councilors per group
HSLS-HDZ	6 / 9
HNS	3 / 9

== Culture ==
There are 21 associations currently operating in Donja Dubrava:

- Donja Dubrava Volunteer Fire Department
- Women's Association
- Small dog from Međimurje "Međi"
- Pensioners' Association
- Association of Volunteers and Veterans of the Homeland War
- Cultural association "Seljačka sloga" Donja Dubrava
- Club of treated alcoholics "Smile"
- Basketball club "Dubravčan"
- Tennis club "Dubravčan"
- Football club "Dubravčan"
- Sports and fishing club "Pike"
- Environmental Protection Association "Senjar"
- Međimurje swallow
- Red Cross
- Hunting Society "Pheasant"
- Equestrian Club "Nikola Zrinski"
- Wind Orchestra of the Municipality of Donja Dubrava
- Nautical Club "Fljojsar"
- Association of fans
- Society "Our Children"

== Gallery ==
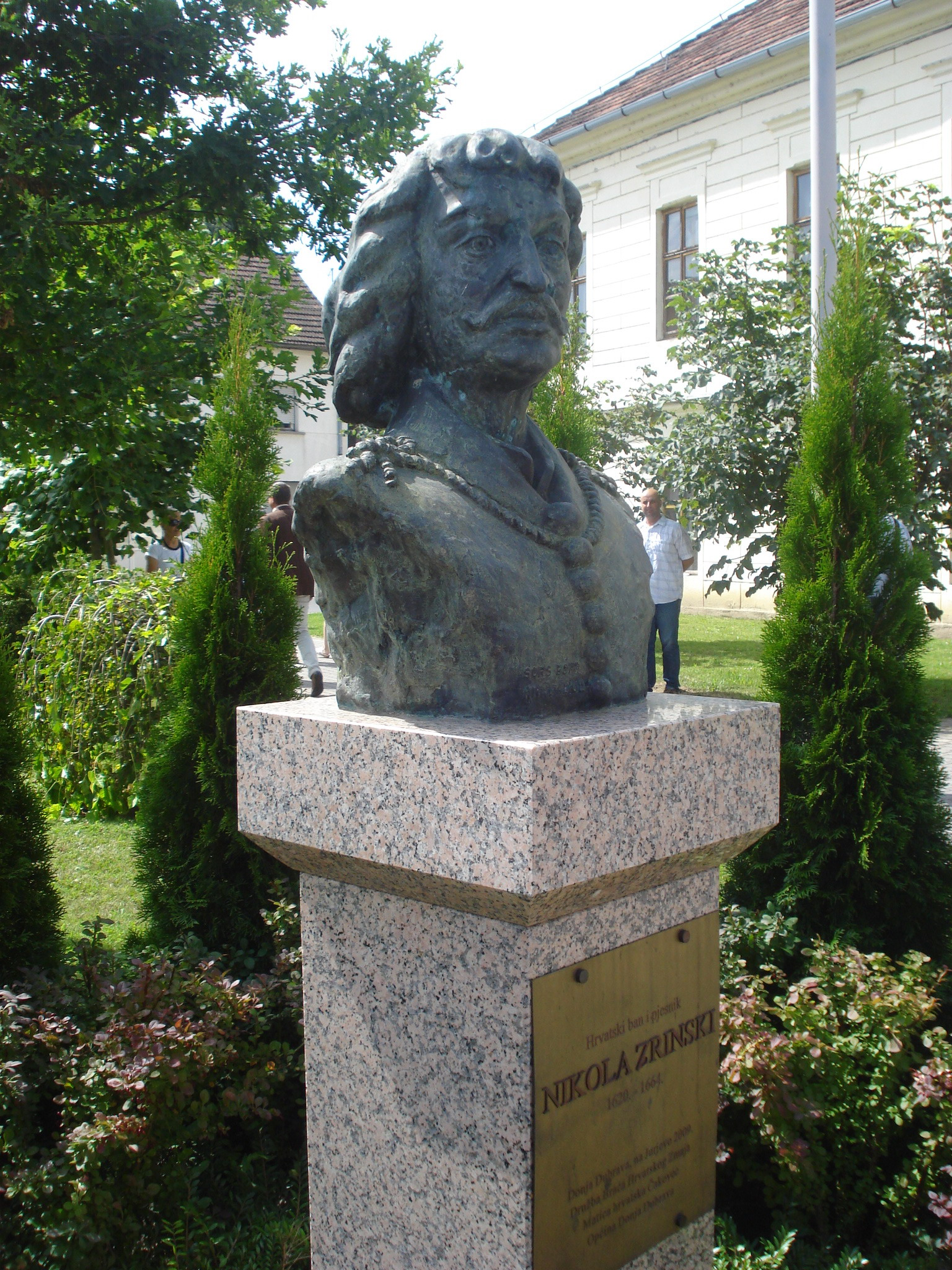
Bust of Nikola Zrinski

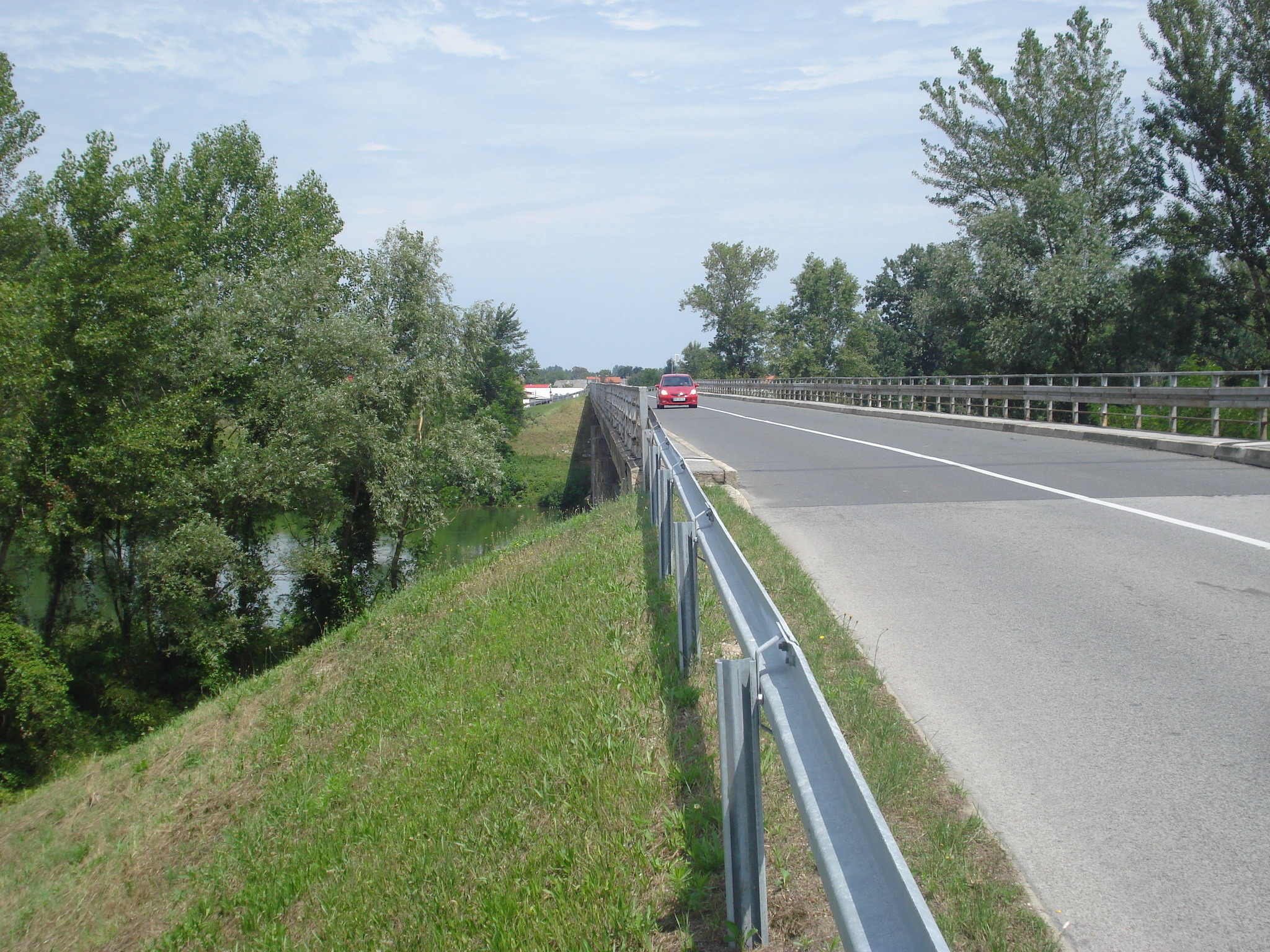
Bridge over the Drava River

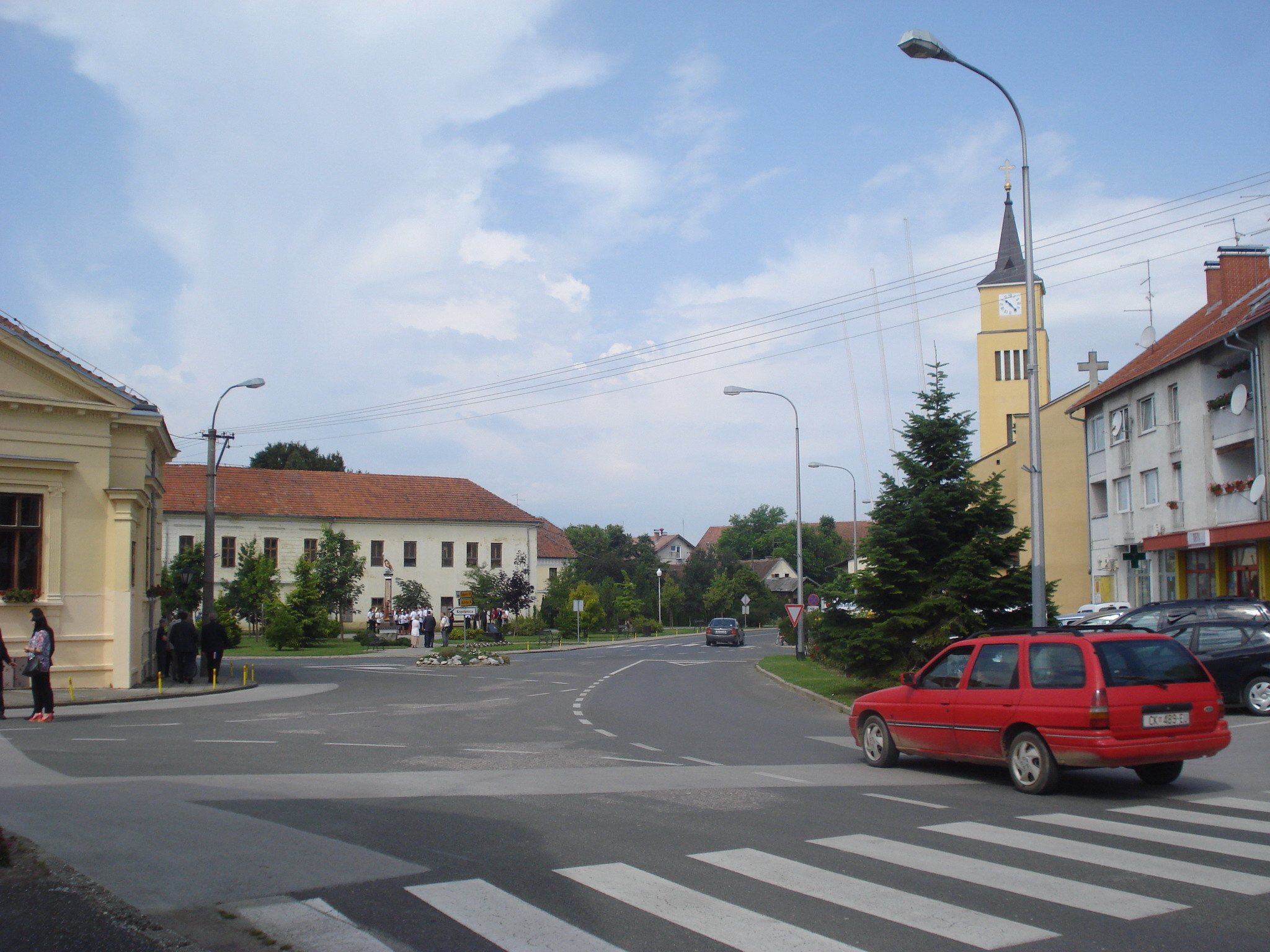
Village centre

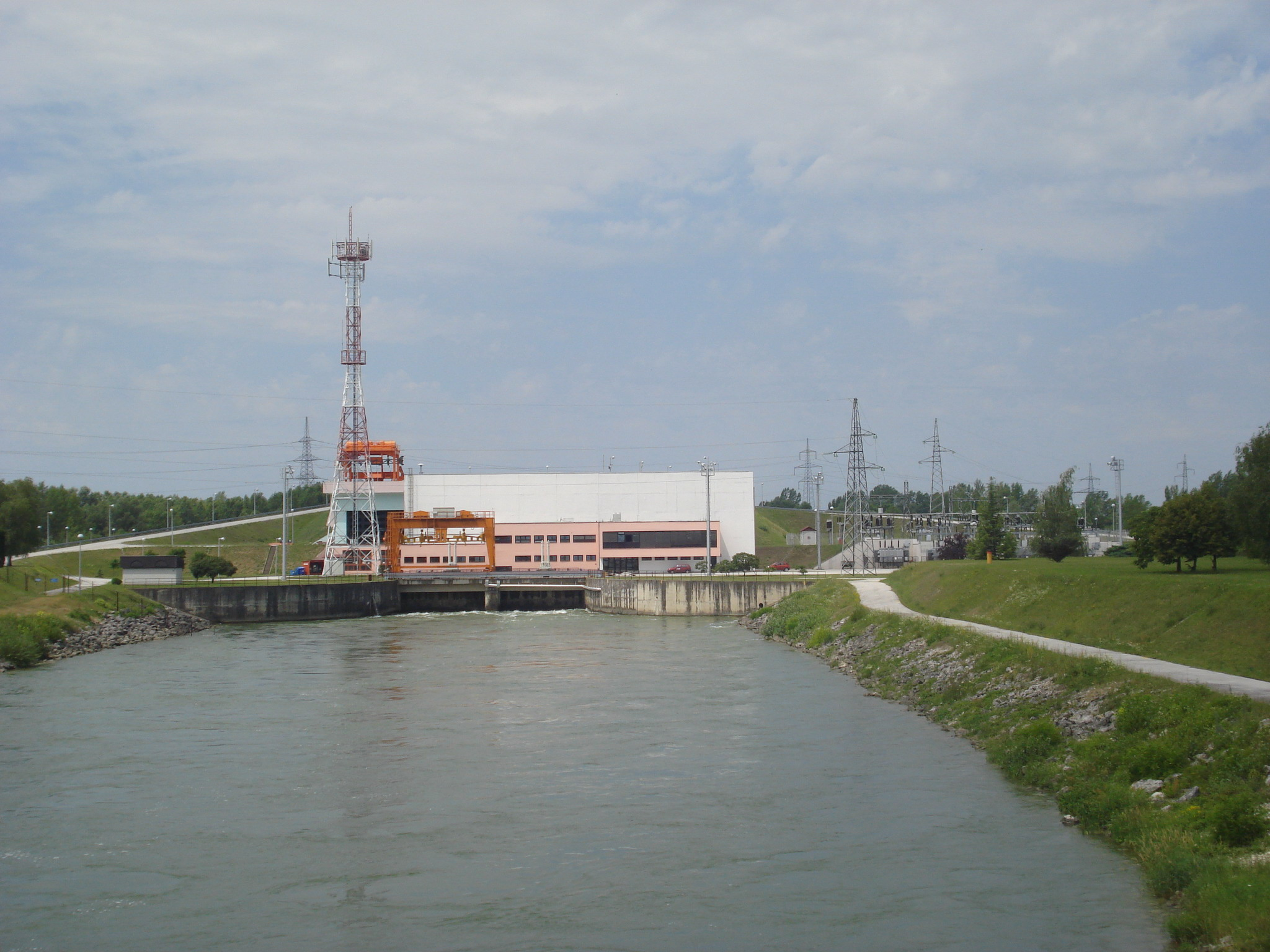
Dubrava Hydroelectric Power Plant

== See also ==
- Dobrava (toponym)
