= Sveta Marija =

- Municipality
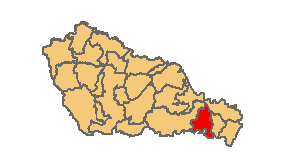
- Location within Međimurje County

- Location within Croatia
- Coordinates: 46°20′N 16°44′E
- Country: Croatia
- Region: Northern Croatia (Međimurje)
- County: Međimurje County

Government
  - Municipal mayor: Đurđica Slamek (NPS)

Area
  - Municipality: 23.0 km^{2} (8.9 sq mi)
  - Urban: 14.1 km^{2} (5.4 sq mi)

Population (2021)
  - Municipality: 1,990
  - Density: 86.5/km^{2} (224/sq mi)
  - Urban: 1,374
  - Urban density: 97.4/km^{2} (252/sq mi)
- Time zone: UTC+1 (CET)
  - Summer (DST): UTC+2 (CEST)
- Postal code: 40326 Sveta Marija
- Website: svetamarija.hr

Sveta Marija (Hungarian: Muraszentmária) is a village and a municipality in Međimurje County, Croatia. It is located in the south-eastern part of the county, near the Drava River, approximately 27 kilometres south-east of Čakovec and 11 kilometres east of Prelog, the largest and second-largest city of Međimurje County respectively.

== Demographics ==
In the 2021 census, the municipality had a population of 1,990 in the following settlements:

- Donji Mihaljevec, population 616
- Sveta Marija, population 1,374

The majority of inhabitants are Croats making up 99.05% of population.

Sveta Marija: Population trends 1857–2021
v

| population | 2950 | 2978 | 2755 | 3066 | 3091 | 3709 | 3683 | 3426 | 3738 | 3458 | 3185 | 3052 | 2794 | 2601 | 2433 | 2317 | 1990 |
| | 1857 | 1869 | 1880 | 1890 | 1900 | 1910 | 1921 | 1931 | 1948 | 1953 | 1961 | 1971 | 1981 | 1991 | 2001 | 2011 | 2021 |

Sources: Croatian Bureau of Statistics publications

== Administration ==
The current mayor of Sveta Marija is Đurđica Slamek (NPS) and the Sveta Marija Municipal Council consists of 9 seats.

| Groups | Councilors per group |
| NPS | 7 / 9 |
| MDS-HSLS | 2 / 9 |
