= Prelog, Croatia =

Prelog
- Town
- Grad Prelog; Town of Prelog
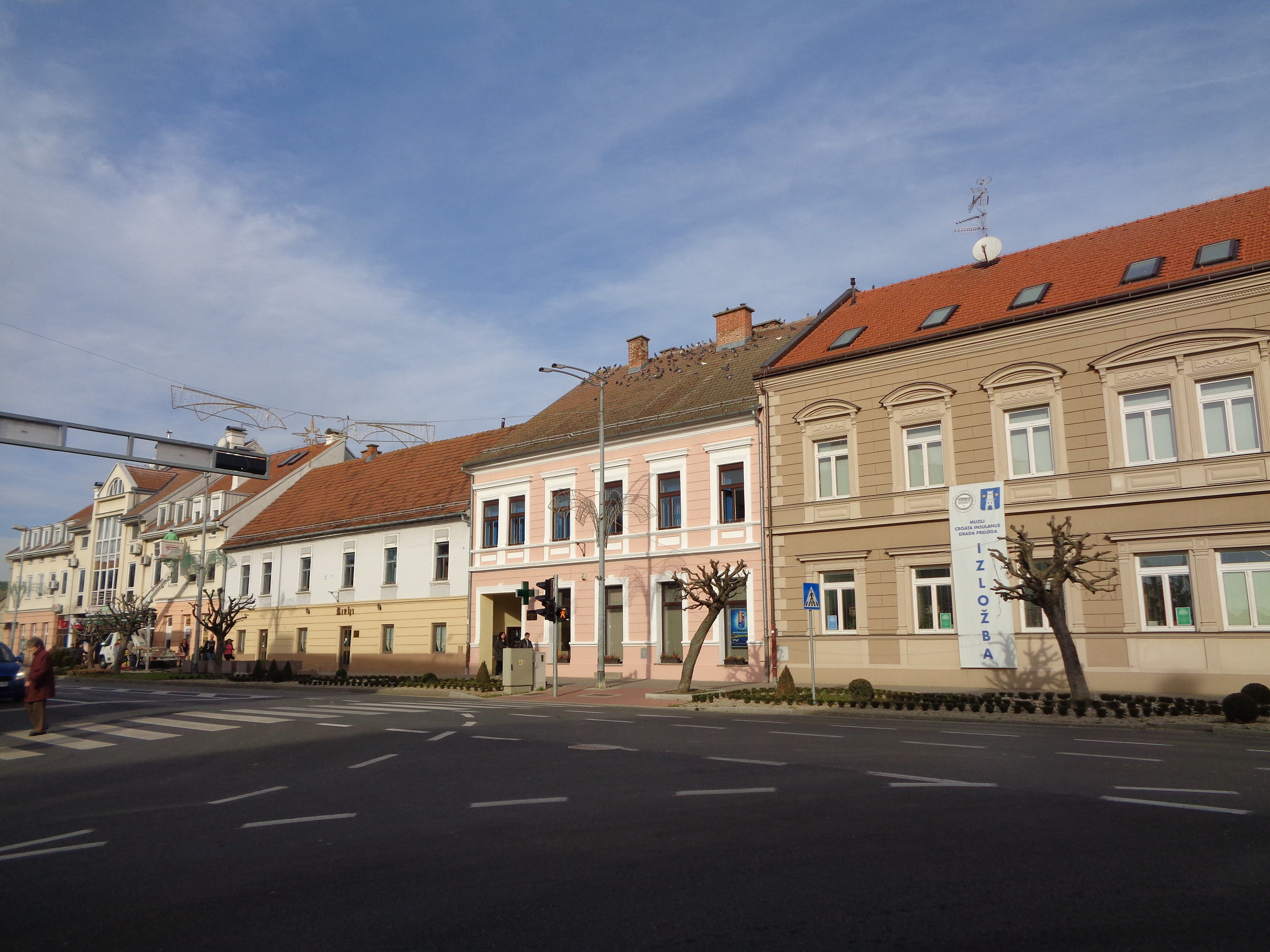
- Prelog

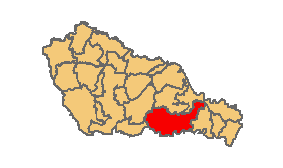
- Location of Prelog in Međimurje County

- Location of Prelog in Croatia
- Coordinates: 46°20′N 16°37′E
- Country: Croatia
- Region: Northern Croatia (Međimurje)
- County: Međimurje County

Government
  - Mayor: Ljubomir Kolarek (HDZ)

Area
  - Town: 63.5 km^{2} (24.5 sq mi)
  - Urban: 24.8 km^{2} (9.6 sq mi)

Population (2021)
  - Town: 7,027
  - Density: 111/km^{2} (287/sq mi)
  - Urban: 4,042
  - Urban density: 163/km^{2} (422/sq mi)
- Time zone: UTC+1 (CET)
  - Summer (DST): UTC+2 (CEST)
- Postal code: 40323 Prelog
- Area code: 040
- Website: prelog.hr

Prelog (Hungarian: Perlak, Kajkavian: Prilok) is a town in Međimurje County, in northern Croatia.

The town is located in the southern part of Međimurje County, on the shores of the Drava River and Lake Dubrava, a reservoir on the river. The town is located 16 kilometres from the county's capital Čakovec, to which it is connected by the D20 state road.

== History ==
Prelog (Hungarian: Perlak) was first mentioned on 6 December 1264, and that date is celebrated annually with a local festival. The name Prelog is probably derived from the Croatian word prelaz, meaning crossing, because the town was a crossing over the Drava River.

In September 1480, the Croatian-Hungarian king Matthias Corvinus stayed in Prelog with his entire army. The town was a trade centre when the Zrinski family (Nikola Zrinski, Petar Zrinski, etc.) controlled the region. In 1671, Petar Zrinski was accused of treason and executed. After that, the population of Prelog decreased due to fear and suspicion of foreign German armies present nearby. In 1716, however, the population started to grow and the town became a major centre for the distribution of rock salt. There was also a silk plant called filandra, which eventually closed in 1848.

The parish church in Prelog was first dedicated to Saint Lawrence but later became the Church of St. James the Great. The current church was built from 1758 to 1761 and renovated from 1987 to 2008.

The first bank in Prelog opened in 1873, and another one in 1905. By the end of the 19th century, the number of residents was around 4,100. The town was the seat of the Perlak district (Hungarian: Perlaki járás) of Zala County in the Kingdom of Hungary until it was occupied and annexed by Yugoslavia in 1918.

During World War II, Prelog was occupied by Hungary again, as the entire Međimurje region was annexed by the Hungarians between 1941 and 1945. After World War II, Prelog was gradually stripped of many administrative functions, and in 1962 it became just a local community.

After Croatia declared independence, Prelog became a municipality and in February 1997 it received town status.

== Demographics ==
In the 2021 census, the town had a population of 7,027 in the following settlements:

- Cirkovljan, population 694
- Čehovec, population 634
- Čukovec, population 257
- Draškovec, population 539
- Hemuševec, population 224
- Oporovec, population 334
- Otok, population 303
- Prelog, population 4,042
Town of Prelog: Population trends 1857–2021
v

population	6357	6872	7121	7849	8420	9450	9679	9291	9756	9466	8621	8328	8080	8024	7871	7815	7027
	1857	1869	1880	1890	1900	1910	1921	1931	1948	1953	1961	1971	1981	1991	2001	2011	2021

Sources: Croatian Bureau of Statistics publications

== Administration ==
The current mayor of Prelog is Ljubomir Kolarek (HDZ) and the Prelog Town Council consists of 13 seats.

Groups	Councilors per group
HDZ-HSS	6 / 13
SDP	4 / 13
NPS	2 / 13
HNS	1 / 13

== Economy and education ==
More than 50% of Prelog's income is based on industry and manufacturing. Agriculture accounts for approximately 19% of the income, while 23% of it is based on commerce and tourism.

Prelog's elementary school serves Prelog and the settlements of Cirkovljan, Čehovec and Otok. In 2025, the school had 488 pupils. There is also a secondary school in the town, the only one in Međimurje County that is not located in Čakovec. The secondary school offers education for jobs in tourism, catering and food processing and in 2024 it had 270 students.

== Sports and recreation ==
Prelog is considered the hometown of motorcycle speedway in Croatia, as the local speedway club was one of the country's first organised clubs in the sport. The speedway was held at the Mladost Stadium, which hosted important events including qualifying rounds of the Speedway World Team Cup in 1972, 1978 and 1996, qualifying rounds of the Speedway World Championship in 1973 and 1980, and the Speedway World Pairs Championship in 1974 and 1981.

There are more than 20 different sports clubs in the town and its wider area, with the most popular sports including football, tennis, basketball, table tennis, handball, etc. There is also a small airfield for powered hang gliders on the shores of the Drava, as well as a small marina on Lake Dubrava nearby, with the lake also being a popular destination for anglers.

== Culture ==
The museum ’"Croata insulanus"’ is located in Prelog and was opened on March 19, 2013. It is located in a building built between the end of the 19th century and the beginning of the 20th century. Prelog also has a monument dedicated to the Croatian ban Josip Jelačić.

== Gallery ==
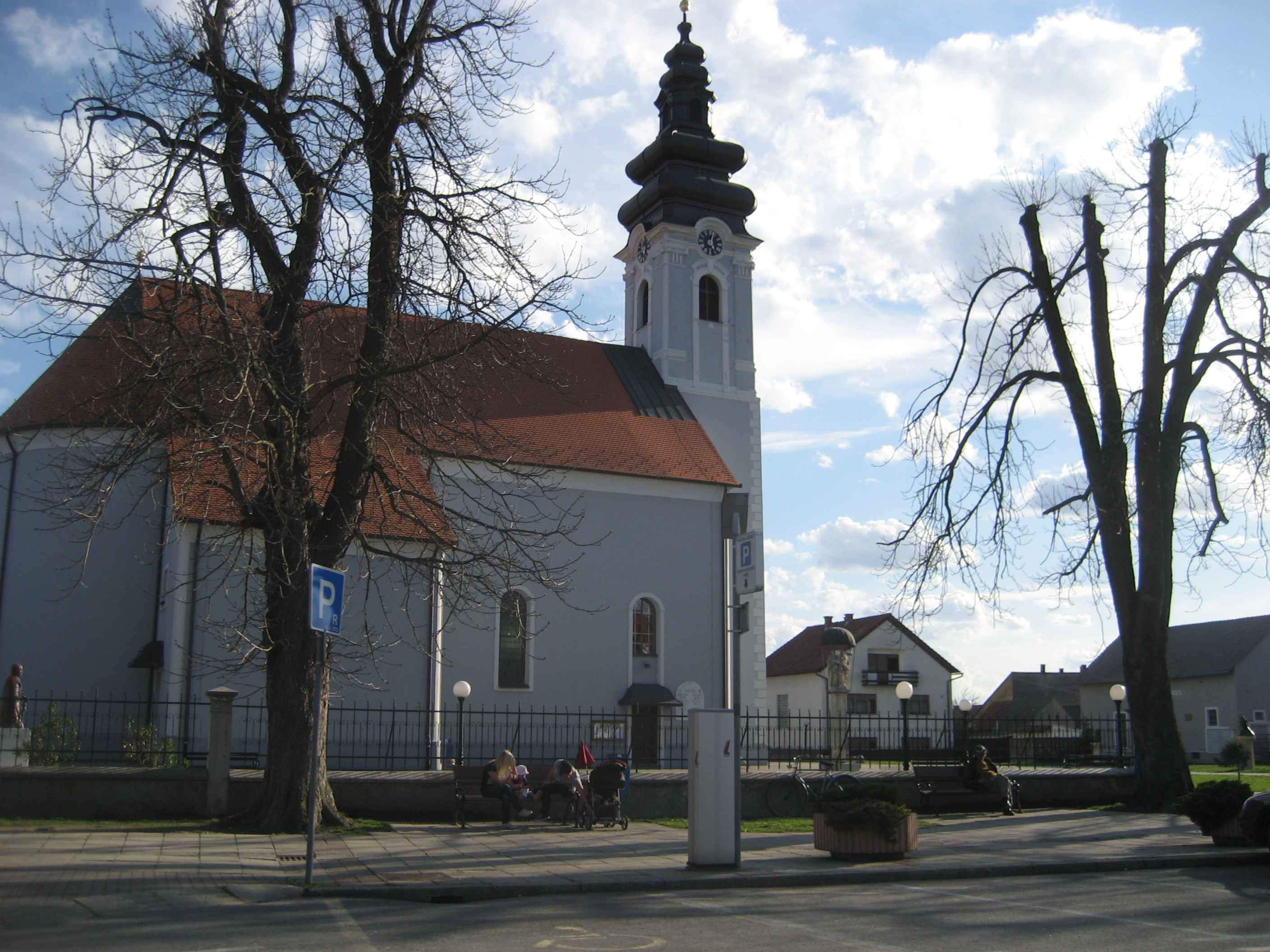
Church of Saint James the Great

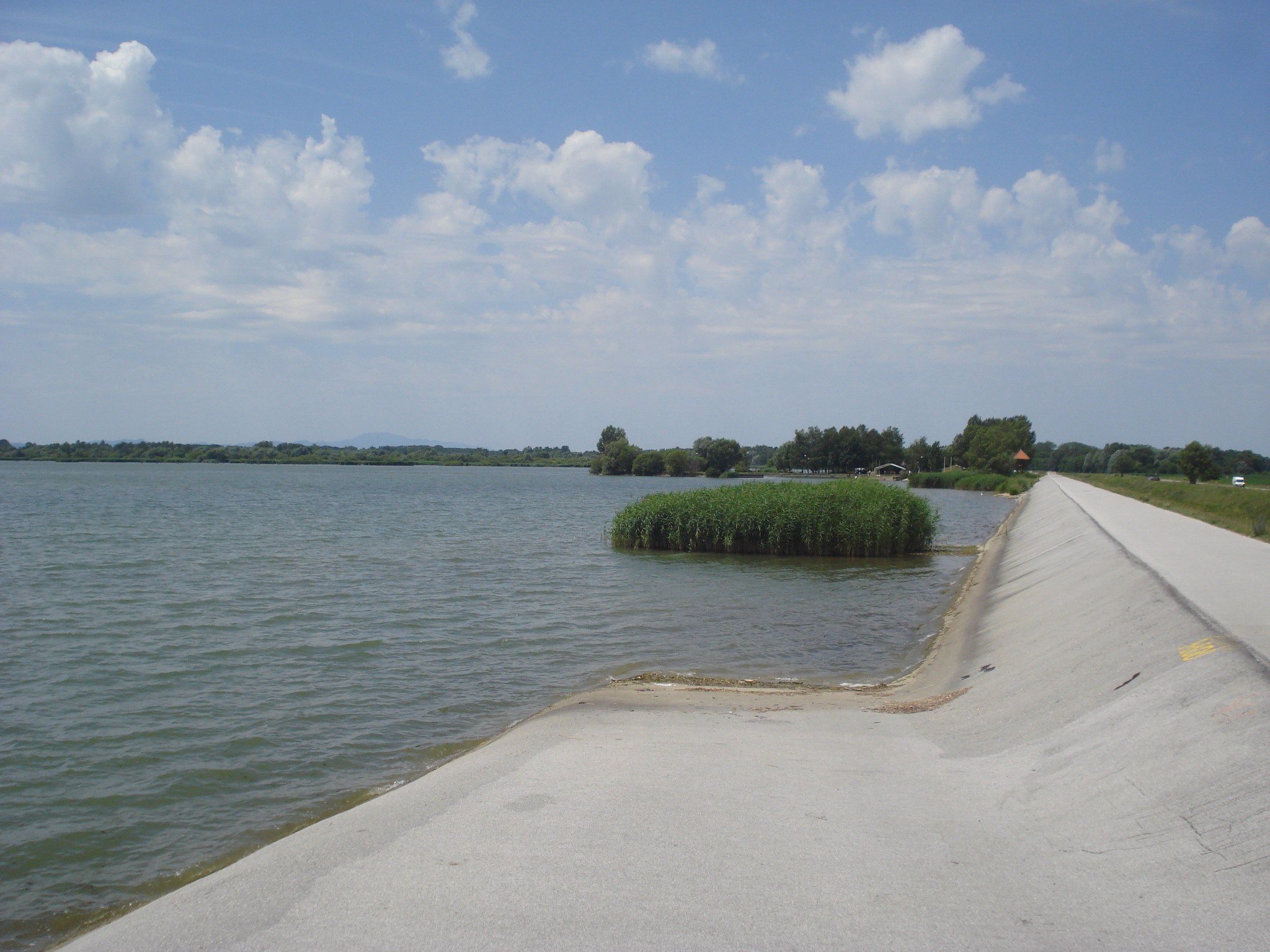
Lake Dubrava near Prelog

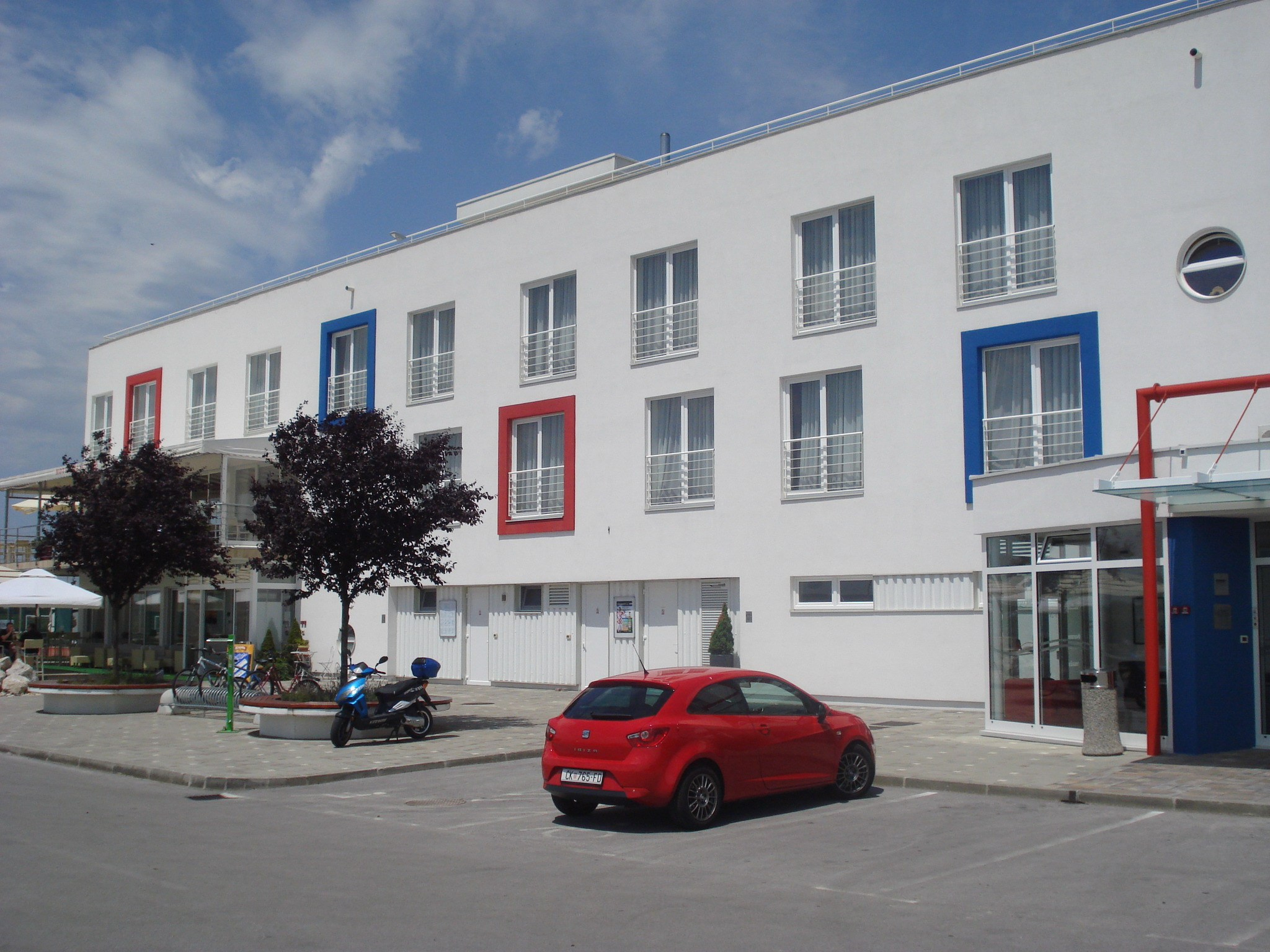
Hotel Panorama

Marina in Prelog
