= List of Croatian mottos =

This is a list of Croatian mottos. Croatia does not have an official motto.

== Mottos ==
- Dok je srca, bit će i Kroacije (As long as there is heart, there will be Croatia) – This motto was originally a line of Antun Gustav Matoš's Pri svetom kralju, about ban Toma Erdödy. Erdödy won many battles against the Ottomans in the 16th century, while at the time Matoš wrote the poem Croatia was struggling to win greater rights within the Austro-Hungarian Empire.
- Bog i Hrvati (God and the Croats) – This motto originates from Ante Starčević's speech to the Croatian Parliament (Sabor) on June 26, 1861, in which he stated that the future of Croatia should not be decided in Austria, but by God and the Croats.
- Za dom spremni (For the homeland, ready) – This motto's origin is unknown, but it was notoriously used by the Ustaše axis puppet regime from the period of 1941-1945 during World War II. It is equivalent of the fascist salute or the "Sieg Heil" Nazi salute. In Croatian War of Independence it was a motto of Croatian paramilitary soldiers. Today it is still commonly used by Croatian neo-nazis.

== See also ==
- U boj, u boj - za narod svoj! (To battle, to battle, for one's people!) – This is a popular football chant that originates from the song U boj, u boj in Ivan Zajc's opera Nikola Šubić Zrinski.
