= Nikola IV Zrinski =

Croatian-Hungarian nobleman and general (died 1566)

Nikola IV Zrinski Miklós IV Zrínyi
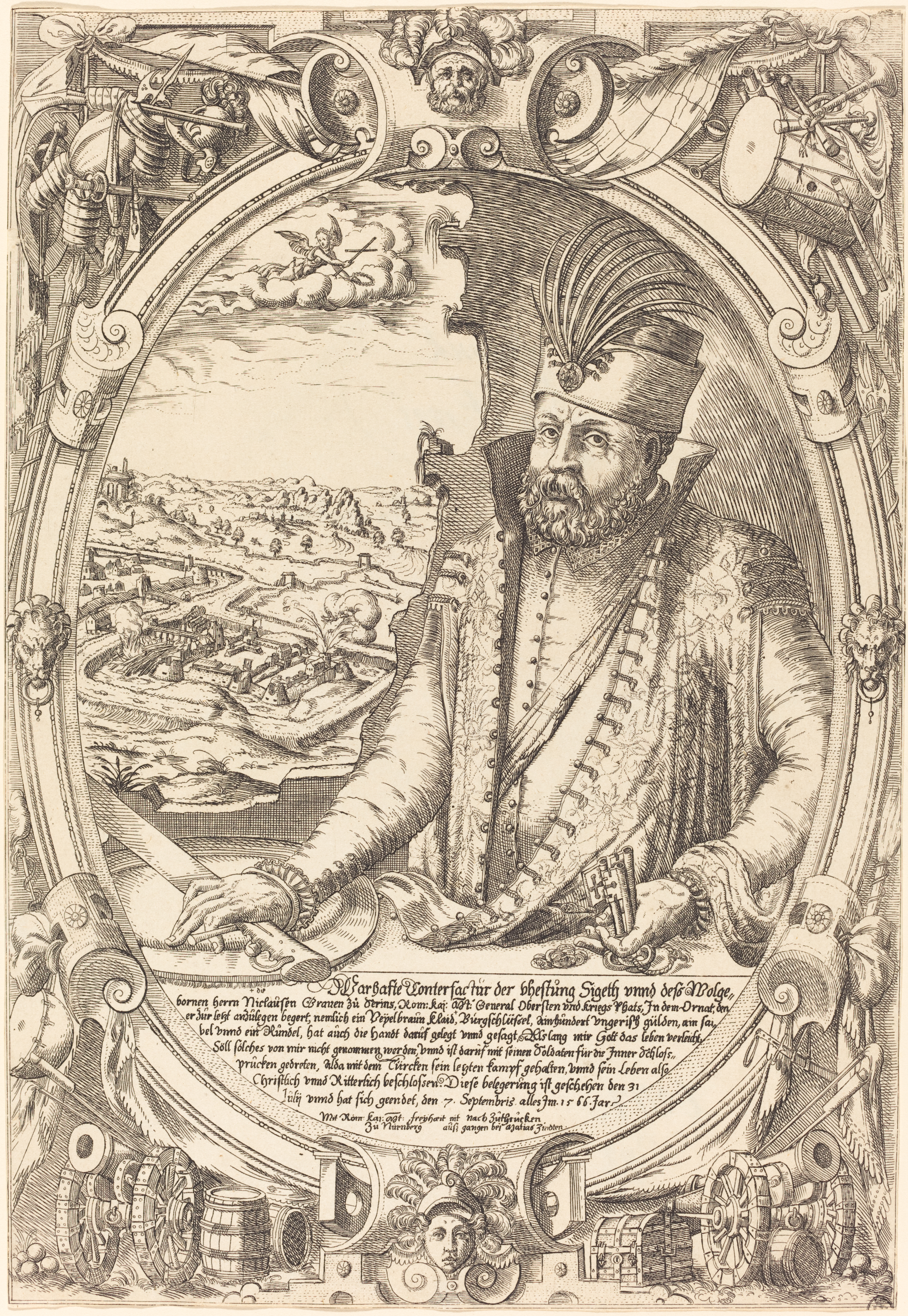
- A 16th-century engraving by Matthias Zündt

Ban of Croatia
- In office 24 December 1542 – 7 September 1556
- Preceded by: Petar Keglević
- Succeeded by: Péter Erdődy

Personal details
- Born: circa 1508 Zrin, Kingdom of Croatia
- Died: 7 September 1566 (circa 58) Szigetvár, Kingdom of Hungary
- Resting place: Pauline monastery in Sveta Jelena, Croatia
- Spouse(s): Katarina Frankopan; Eva Rosenberg
- Children: Ivan II, Jelena, Katarina, Juraj IV, Doroteja, Uršula, Barbara, Margareta, Magdalena, Ana, Kristofor, Nikola V, Ivan III
- Parent(s): Nikola III Zrinski; Jelena Karlović

Military service
- Battles/wars: Siege of Vienna (1529); Siege of Pest (1542); Battle of Babócsa (1556); Battle of Moslavina (1562); Siege of Szigetvár (1566)

Nikola IV Zrinski or Miklós IV Zrínyi (Hungarian: Zrínyi Miklós, pronounced [ˈzriːɲi ˈmikloːʃ]; 1507/1508 – 7 September 1566), also commonly known as Nikola Šubić Zrinski (Croatian: [nǐkola ʃûbitɕ zrîːɲskiː]), (Note: There never existed a historical person with a name of Nikola Šubić Zrinski neither did his family members call themselves as "Šubić Zrinski". In the historical sources, he is simply known as Nikola Zrinski i.e. Miklós Zrínyi which in the English language translates as Nicholas of Zrin. In Croatia besides the real name he is also known as Nikola Šubić Zrinski, which is a 19th-century variation popularized by the same-titled opera, while in Croatia and Hungary as Nikola Zrinski Sigetski and Miklós Zrínyi Szigetvári (in English language Nicholas of Zrin of Szigetvár).) was a Croatian-Hungarian nobleman and general, Ban of Croatia from 1542 until 1556, royal master of the treasury from 1557 until 1566, and a descendant of the Croatian noble families Zrinski and Kurjaković. During his lifetime the Zrinski family became the powerful noble family in the Kingdom of Croatia.

Zrinski became well known across Europe for his involvement in the Siege of Szigetvár (1566), where he died stopping Ottoman Empire's Sultan Suleiman the Magnificent's advance towards Vienna. The battle was considered so important that the French clergyman and statesman Cardinal Richelieu described it as "the battle that saved civilization". Zrinski came to be considered a role model of a faithful and sacrificial warrior, Christian hero as well as a national hero in both Croatia and Hungary, and is often portrayed in artworks.

== Early life ==
Nikola was a Croat. He was born as one of the six children of Nikola III of the Zrinski family from the noble tribe of Šubić, and of Jelena Karlović, sister of future Croatian Ban Ivan Karlović of the Kurjaković family from the noble tribe of Gusić. His birthplace is unknown, but it is generally considered to have been Zrin Castle. The same is about his birth date, for which different primary sources give dates ranging between 1507, 1508 and 1518, but according to them and other evidence it is considered to have been in 1507 or 1508, with 1508 most often cited in scholarship.

== Activities ==
Zrinski already distinguished himself in the early twenties during the Siege of Vienna in 1529, for which was awarded with a horse and golden chain. After the death of his father Nikola III in 1534, Nikola IV with older brother Ivan I inherited estates in Pounje, and they simultaneously started to fortify them as well as make contacts with the Ottomans, to whom they paid a yearly tribute like their father. However, between 1537 and 1540 they started fighting against Gazi Husrev-beg's forces for the control of fort Dubica.

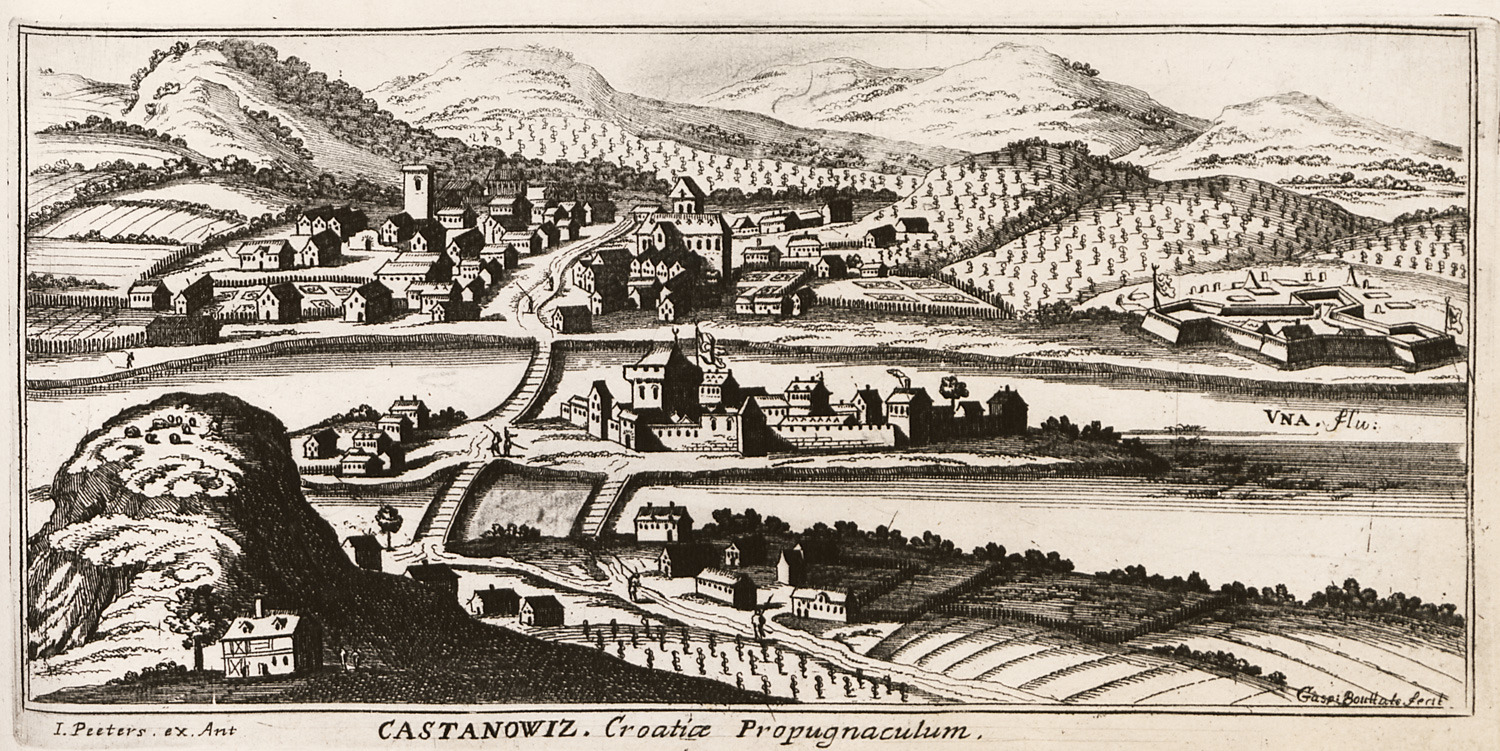
Fortress Kostajnica where Zrinski murdered Johann Katzianer, engraved by Gaspar Bouttats, 1686.

In January 1539, Zrinski murdered the Imperial Army commander Johann Katzianer at Fortress Kostajnica because Katzianer had deserted the King Ferdinand I Habsburg, had started to conspire in favor of throne contestant John Zápolya, and had cooperated with the Ottomans. During the following year, the estates of the Zrinski brothers were again attacked by the Ottomans. By June 1540, they fought the combined forces of Husrev-beg, Murat-beg Tardić and Mehmed-beg Jahjapašić, and because of a lack of sufficient help from the Austrian military, the fortress Kostajnica was temporarily lost to the Turks. Zrin Castle and Gvozdansko Castle managed to hold up, but the mining sites and others were devastated. They successfully repelled the attack however, and from that moment on the Zrinski family continuously fought against the Ottomans.

In 1541, together with his older brother Ivan I, Nikola received large possessions of the Vrana Priory in Croatia and Hungary by Ferdinand I, but with the death of his brother in the same year, he also became the only successor to the estates of the Zrinski family. In 1542, according to Antun Vramec, he saved the Imperial Army forces from defeat at the Siege of Pest by intervening with 400 Croats, for which service he was appointed Ban of Croatia, a position which held until 1556.

Together with other Croatian magnates, he participated in many battles in Croatia against the invading Turks, among others in the battle of Otočac (1543) and the battle of Konjščina (1545). During this period he frequently went to Gvozdansko Castle in order to inspect the silver mines and the mint, like in other forts in the Pounje and Pokuplje basins. As compensation for him fighting against the Ottomans, he was granted the whole area of Međimurje (Muraköz) on 12 March 1546 by King Ferdinand I, hence the center of the Zrinski family has moved from Zrin Castle to the city of Čakovec, where he significantly rearranged the existing Čakovec Castle. In 1549 he was given the right to collect tax from the subjects by himself, and in 1561 the right to freely settle serfs on his estates.

In 1556, Zrinski won a series of victories over the Ottomans, culminating in the battle of Babócsa, and thus preventing the fall of Szigetvár. However, since he was unsatisfied with the amount of resources for defense, he voluntary withdrew from his position as Ban of Croatia. In the next year, 1557, he was titled Master of the treasury, a royal office position which he held until death, becoming once again one of the fifteen most influential persons in the Kingdom of Hungary. Additionally, he served as a captain of Croatian light cavalry (1550–1560), captain of Szigetvár and commander of the Transdanubian border from 1561 and 1563 respectively and until his death.

In 1563, on the coronation of Emperor Maximilian as king of Hungary, Zrinski attended the ceremony at the head of 3000 Croatian and Magyar mounted noblemen, in the hope of obtaining the highest dignity of Palatine, vacant by the death of Tamás Nádasdy. Some historians like Géza Pálffy consider he did manage to obtain it. In the next year, he hastened southwards to defend the frontier, and defeated the Ottomans at Szeged. In 1565, Zrinski brought a copy of the Holy Crown of Hungary to Vienna for the funeral ceremony of Ferdinand I.

== Death ==
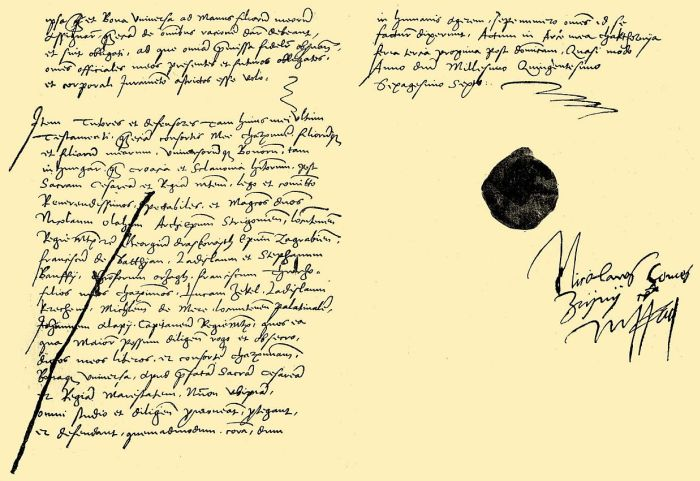
Zrinski's letter with signature, 23 April 1566.

In the spring of 1566, Zrinski was located in Szigetvár, a strategic fortress for the defense of the shortest route to Vienna, when the Ottoman sultan Suleiman the Magnificent went with a large army for a second attempt to conquer Vienna, but first decided to capture Szigetvár. Zrinski was informed by the new king, Maximilian II, that he could either remain or leave it to another captain, but in an April, 23rd letter, Zrinski wrote that it was his will to remain because many thousands of people depend on the fortress' survival, and he started to strategically prepare to confront the Sultan. Suleiman's forces reached Belgrade on 27 June after a forty-nine-day march. Learning of Zrinski's success in an attack upon a Turkish forces at Siklós in July, destroying several detachments, Suleiman decided to postpone his attack on Eger and instead attack Zrinski's fortress at Szigetvár to eliminate him as a threat.

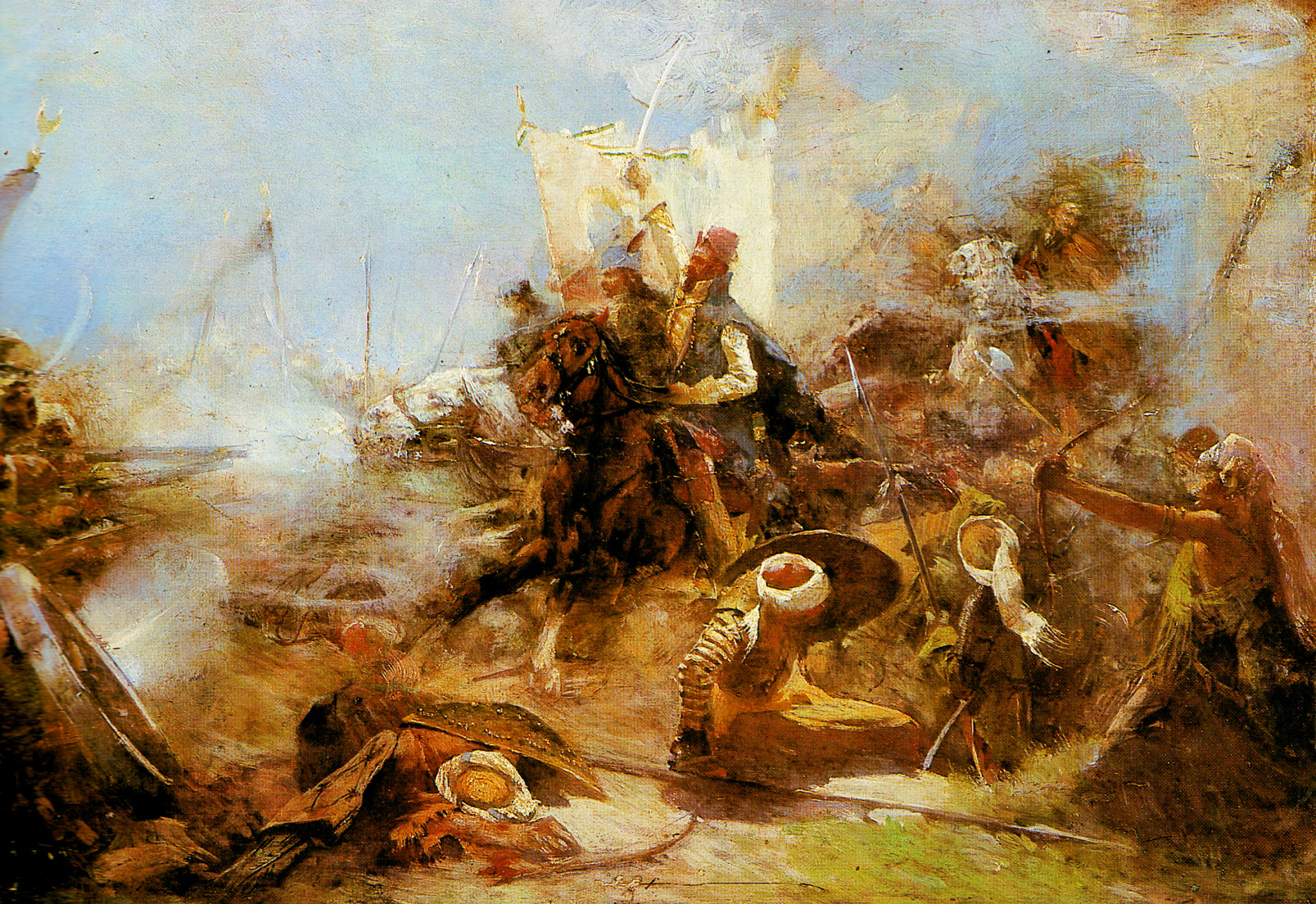
Zrínyi's Charge on the Turks from the Fortress of Szigetvár, by Simon Hollósy, 1896.

For over a month from 5 August to 7 September, with a small force of roughly 2,300–2,500 soldiers, mostly Croats, Zrinski heroically defended the small fortress of Szigetvár against the whole Ottoman army of over 100,000 soldiers and 300 cannons, led by Suleiman in person. They did so without reinforcements which were promised by the Hungarian–Croatian King, and against Suleiman's offer of Croatian land to Zrinski. The siege of Szigetvár ended with every remaining member of the garrison in a desperate and suicidal charge from the fortress led by Zrinski on 7 September 1566. Suleiman also died, but from natural causes, one day before the Ottomans won the siege. As Ottoman forces had suffered heavy casualties during the siege of Szigetvár, the army only managed to additionally capture the nearby fort Babócsa before Grand Vizier Sokollu Mehmed Pasha withdrew the army and ended the Ottoman conquest.

According to historical sources, Zrinski decided to be dressed in a hat and nice suit rather than a helmet and armour during his final charge, and chose to have his father's sabre in hand, so that he it could be said that he had "bared all that I was judged by God's judgment", and offered one hundred gold coins as a reward for the Ottoman soldier who cut off his head. He was shot by a Janissary with a musket in the head and chest, while by other accounts it was first by a musket in the chest and then an arrow to the head. It is considered that his head was sent by Mehmed Pasha to Budin Pasha Sokullu Mustafa, or to new Sultan Selim II, but eventually, the head was buried by son Juraj IV Zrinski, Boldizsár Batthyány and Ferenc Tahy in September 1566 at the Pauline monastery in Sveta Jelena, Šenkovec, Croatia. It is uncertain what happened to his body. It could have been burned or buried near the battlefield, but according to most sources it is considered to have been buried by a former captive, Mustafa Vilić, a Muslim from Banja Luka, because he had been well treated by Zrinski.

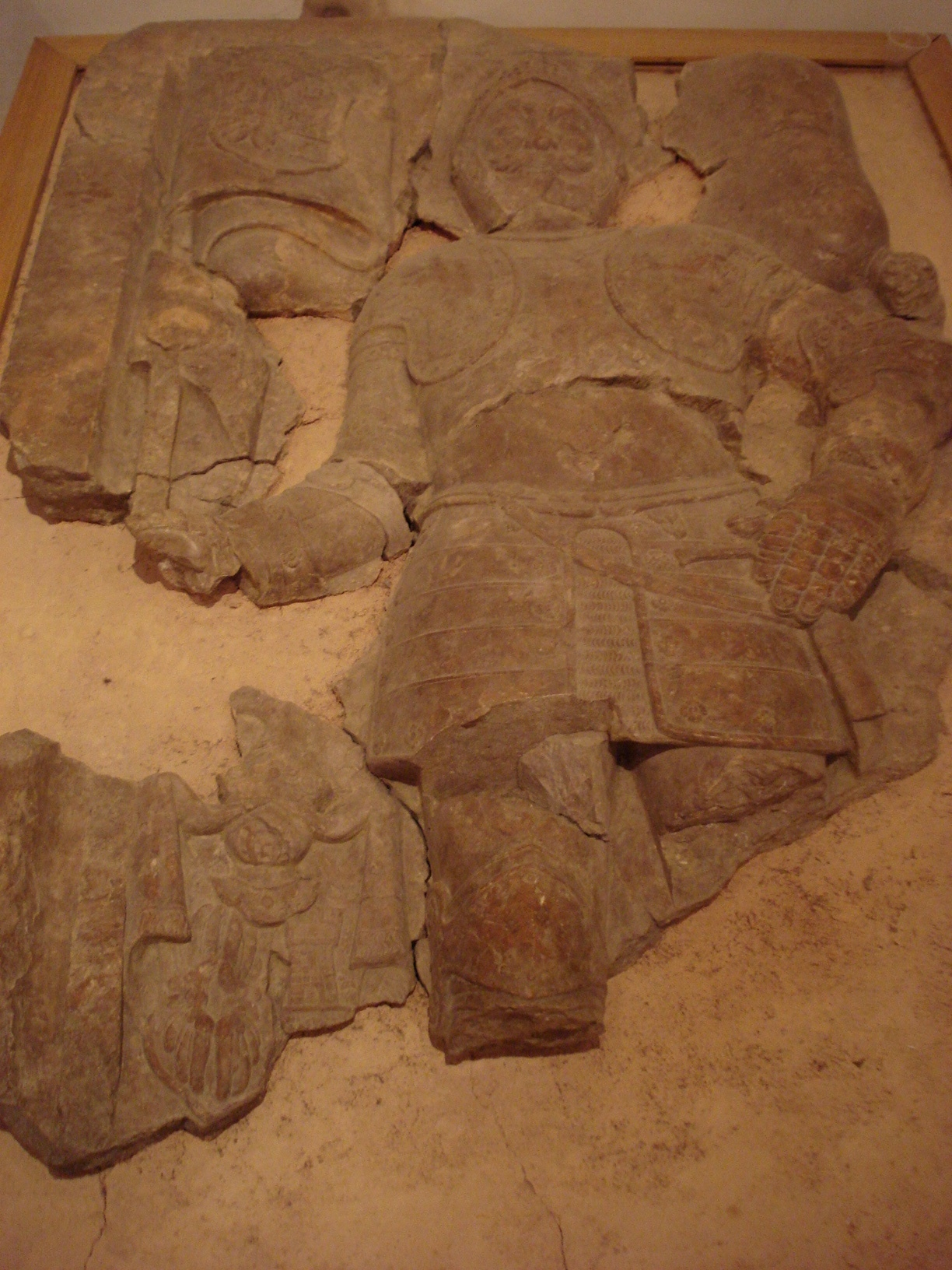
The tombstone of Zrinski in Čakovec, Croatia.

In Međimurje County Museum in Čakovec are preserved remains of the tombstone of a member of the Zrinski family, which most probably belonged to Nikola IV, and under which his head was likely buried. Preserved in Kunsthistorisches Museum in Vienna are the sabre, helmet, and possibly the silk robe with decorative gold thread which were created and worn by Zrinski during the 1563 coronation of Maximilian II. They were initially collected by Ferdinand II, Archduke of Austria at Ambras Castle in the 16th century.

== Marriage ==
Zrinski married twice, first in 1543 with Katarina Frankopan (d. 1561) and then Eva Rosenberg (1537–1591) in 1564. Due to his marriage to Katarina Frankopan, a sister of Count Stjepan Frankopan of Ozalj (d. 1577), her vast estates, including Ozalj and part of littoral cities like Bakar, became at his disposal in 1550 due to the inheritance contract. With his marriage to Eva Rosenberg, a sister of William of Rosenberg the Burgrave of Bohemia, he managed to connect with one of the most notable Czech noble families and, according to Géza Pálffy, to the highest elite of the Kingdom of Hungary. His marriages and his service during his lifetime managed to elevate the Zrinski family to become the most powerful noble family in the Kingdom of Croatia.

=== Children ===
With Katarina and Eva, Zrinski had thirteen children, Ivan I, Jelena, Katarina, Juraj IV, Doroteja, Uršula, Barbara, Margareta, Magdalena, Ana, Kristofor, Nikola V, and Ivan II, of whom most notably was his successor Juraj IV Zrinski. One of the younger sons married a lady from the noble Czech Kolowrat family. According to Dóra Bobory "it is possible to detect an increasingly conscious marriage policy within the Zrinski family, where all the daughters of Miklos married well, and where father himself chose his spouses wisely". Most notably, Doroteja became the wife of Boldizsár Batthyány in 1566, Katarina wife of Imre Forgách in 1576, while some other two daughters married into Thurzó family, specifically Katarina was previously (1562) married to Ferenc Thurzó being the mother of future Palatine of Hungary, György Thurzó. For some of them, Uršula, Katarina, and Doroteja is known that were educated at Güssing.

== Legacy ==
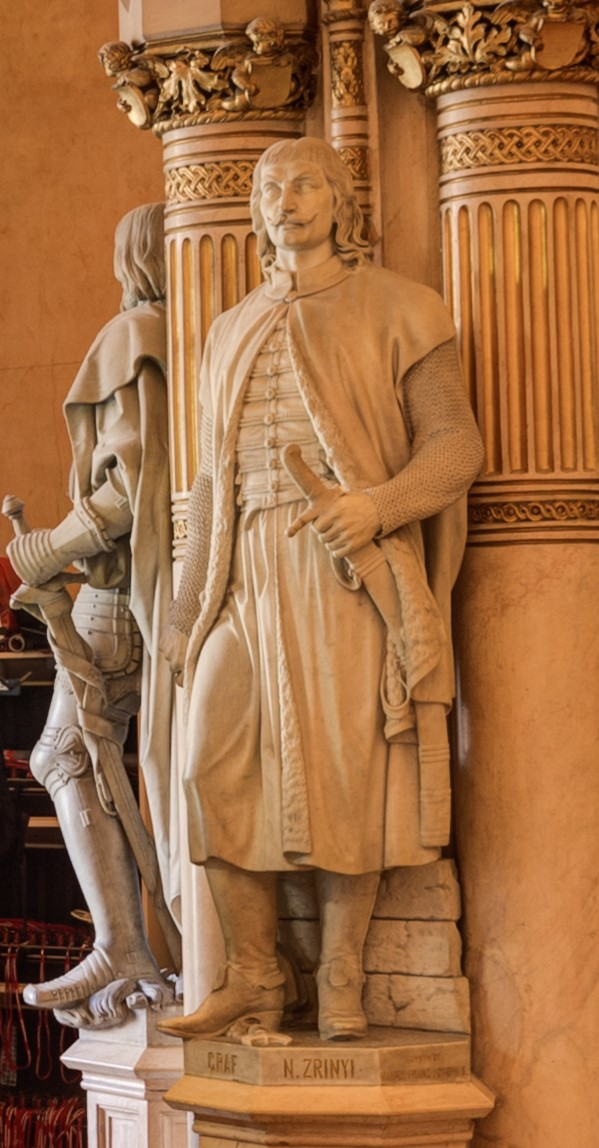
Zrinski's statue at the Feldherrenhalle, Museum of Military History, Vienna, Austria, 1865.

Zrinski's heroic act at the siege of Szigetvár made him a well known European Christian hero, a defender and savior of Christendom, and "a model of a faithful and sacrificial warrior in the service of his ruler". He was also compared to Leonidas I. His cult of heroism was especially preserved among the Croats, Hungarians, and Slovaks. In Croatia, it also represented a symbol of Croatian identity, directed against Ottoman, Austrian and Hungarian political influence. Similarly, he gained some popularity during the Polish struggle for independence in second half of the 19th century and early 20th century. According to historians like Ágnes R. Várkonyi and Alojzije Jembrih, Zrinski had an "exceptional military talent, was a successful businessman, politician with a concept, and an endlessly passionate person".

He was remembered in a first-hand report Podsjedanje i osvojenje Sigeta (1568) by Zrinski's scribe and chamberlain Franjo Črnko, which was immediately translated in Latin by Samuel Budina and published in the same year titled Historia Sigethi, totius Sclavoniae fortissimi propugnaculi..., with the second edition (1587) edited by Petrus Albinus. It was also translated into German, Italian, Spanish and other languages. Other works include a historical epic Vazetje Sigeta grada (1584) by Brne Karnarutić, and most prominently Hungarian epic poem The Siege of Sziget (1651) by his great-grandson Nikola VII Zrinski and its partial Croatian variation Adrianskoga mora Sirena (1660) by great-grandson Petar Zrinski. In the epic poem, the elder Zrinski is the main hero and has assured Zrinski's place in Hungarian culture as it remains in print today and is considered one of the landmarks of Hungarian literature. Compared to the Hungarian poem, which is an exception in Hungarian literature, the Croatian variation fits the Croatian literature tradition. Vladislav Menčetić's Trublja slovinska (1665) is the first Ragusan literature work that introduces the idea of antemurale Christianitatis for Croatian territories and celebrates Zrinski as a hero. Pavao Ritter Vitezović also wrote a related epic poem Odiljenje sigetsko (1684).

In the 18th century, his heroic act inspired school dramas in Jesuit Gymnasiums, including Andreas Friz's Nicolai Zriny ad Szigethum victoria (1738). The German author Theodor Körner wrote a tragedy, Zriny: Ein Trauerspiel (1812), after which August von Adelburg Abramović wrote the libretto for his opera Zrinyi (1868). The Croatian composer Ivan Zajc created an opera titled Nikola Šubić Zrinski (1876), as a patriotic work which is still performed regularly today. It includes an aria "U boj, u boj", which is regularly performed at the Japanese Kwansei Gakuin University since the World War I.

Since the 16th century, Zrinski featured in many engravings and paintings, of him as a portrait or during the siege mostly as leading the charge, like by Matthias Zündt, Miklós Barabás, Viktor Madarász, Mikoláš Aleš, Bela Čikoš Sesija and Oton Iveković among others. In 1914, the Czech painter Alphonse Mucha dedicated to Zrinski the painting titled Defense of Sziget against the Turks by Nicholas Zrinsky: The Shield of Christendom from his The Slav Epic cycle.

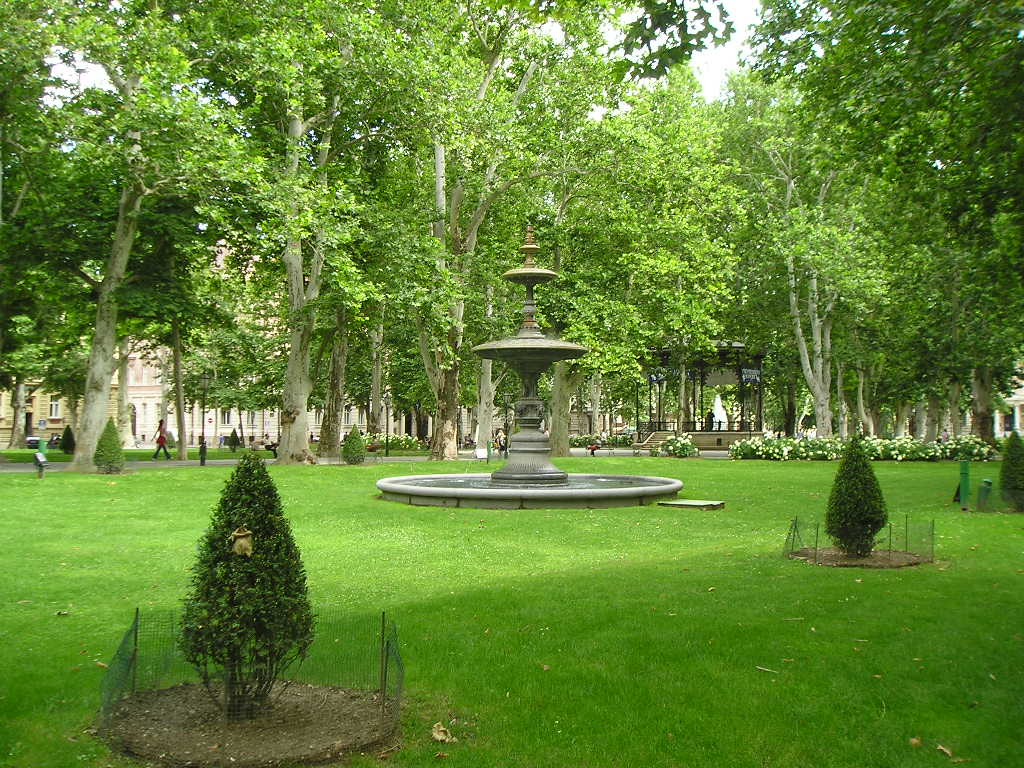
Nikola Šubić Zrinski Square and park in the center of Zagreb.

By the imperial resolution of Emperor Franz Joseph I of Austria on 28 February 1863, Zrinski was included in the list of "Austria's most famous warlords and field commanders worthy of eternal emulation", in whose honor and memory was built a life-size statue of Carrara marble at the Museum of Military History, Vienna, in 1865 by sculptor Nikolaus Vay (1828-1886). There also exist several sculptures and busts of Zrinski in Zagreb, Čakovec and Šenkovec in Croatia, Budapest and Szigetvár in Hungary, and Heldenberg in Austria among others. Parks in Zagreb (see Nikola Šubić Zrinski Square), Koprivnica and Križevci among others are named after him.

In 1866 was held a solemn commemoration of the 300th anniversary of Zrinski's death in Croatia. In commemoration of the 450th anniversary of the siege of Szigetvár (1566), the year 2016 was declared a memorial year of Nikola Zrinski and the siege of Szigetvár in Croatia and Hungary. On that occasion were held various cultural and artistic events, published many papers and books as well as organized scientific conferences in Zagreb, Čakovec, Vienna, and Pécs.

The Order of Nikola Šubić Zrinski is the ninth-ranked honour order given by the Republic of Croatia, awarded since 1995 to Croatian or foreign citizens for acts of heroism.

== Gallery ==
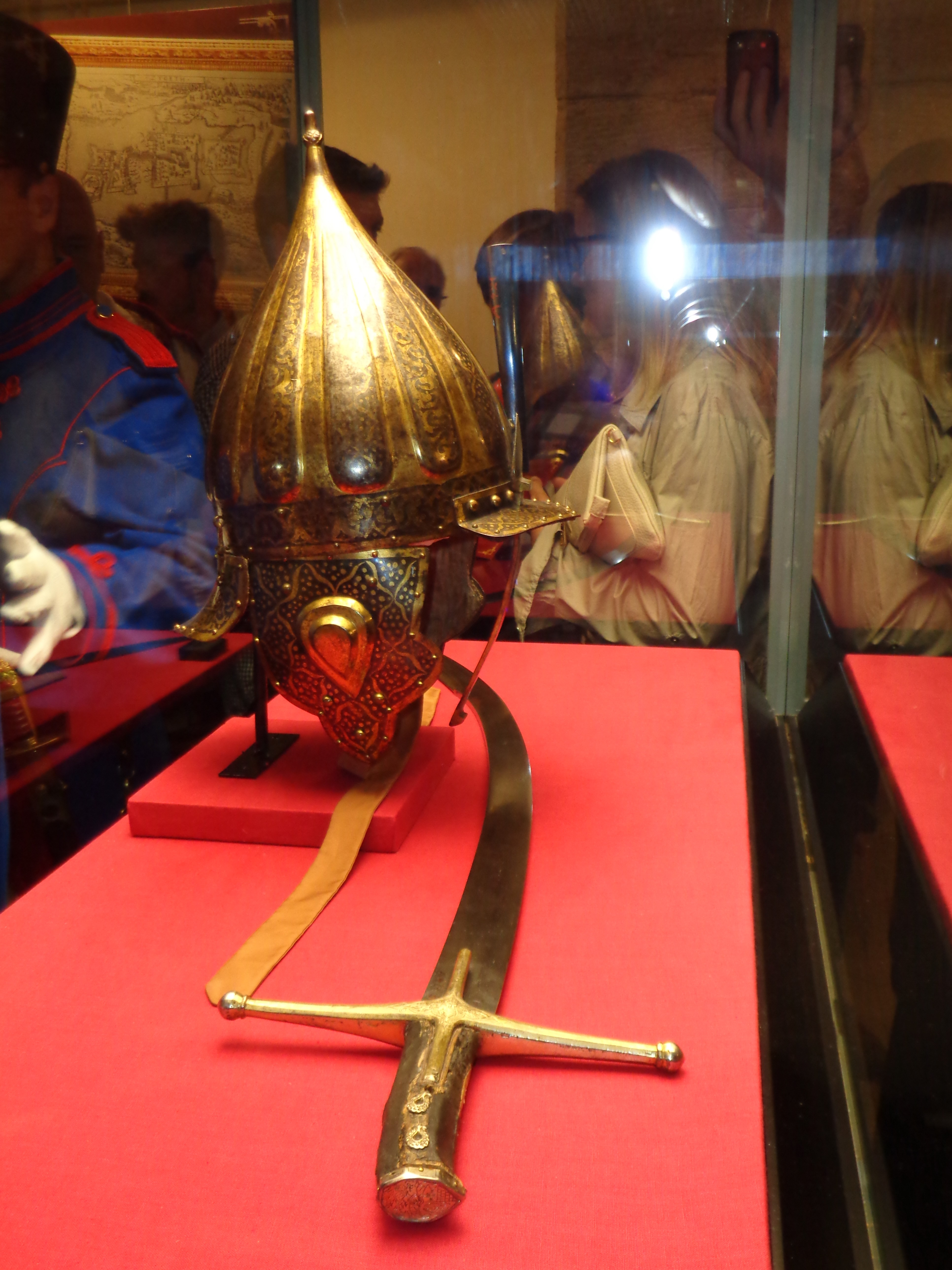
Sabre and helmet of Zrinski at an exhibition in Međimurje County Museum on the 450th anniversary of the siege of Szigetvár, 2016

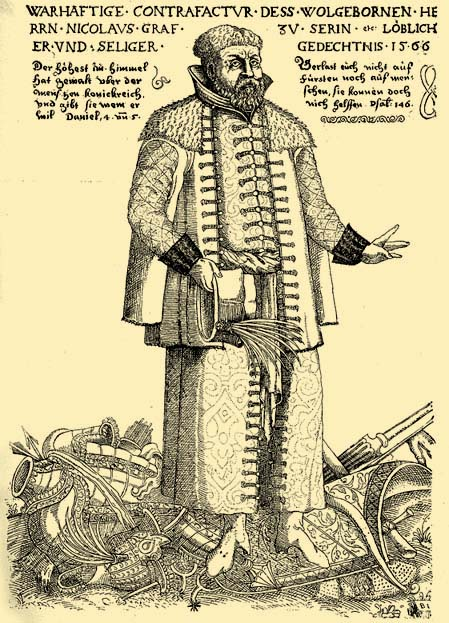
An engraving by Jenichen Boldizsár, 1566

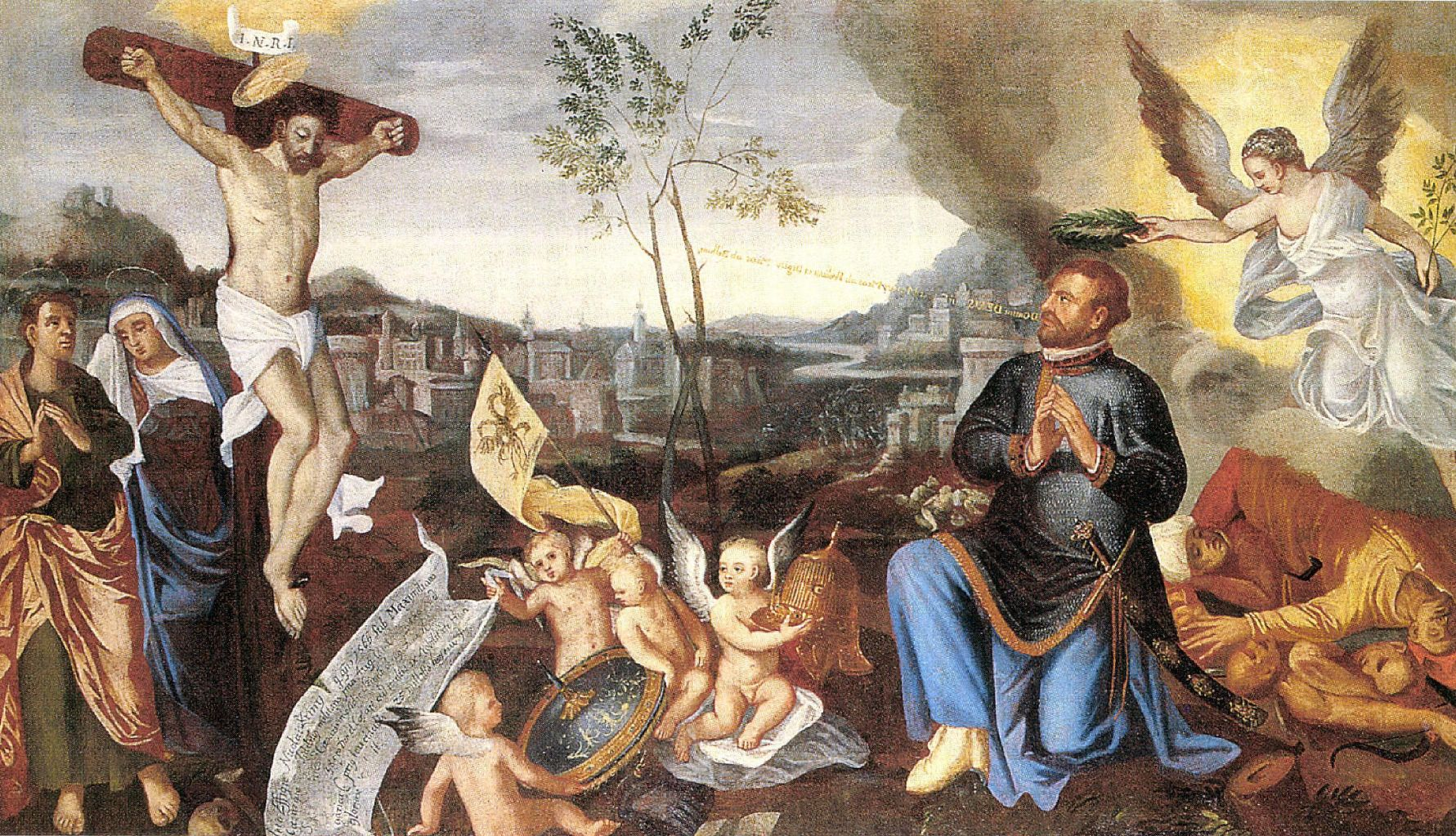
The apotheosis of Miklós Zrínyi, unknown author, 16th century

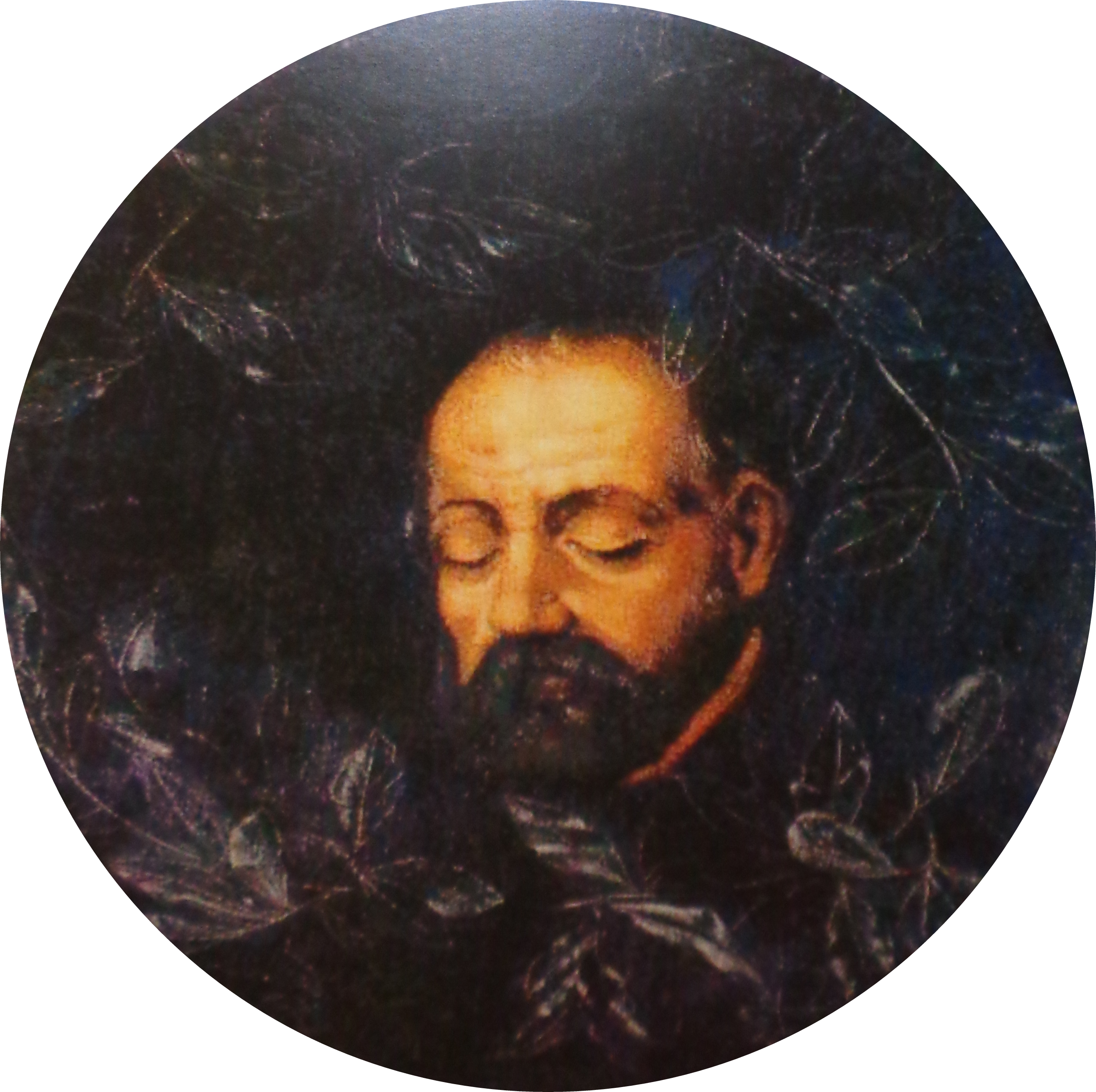
A funeral portrait, unknown author, 17th century or earlier

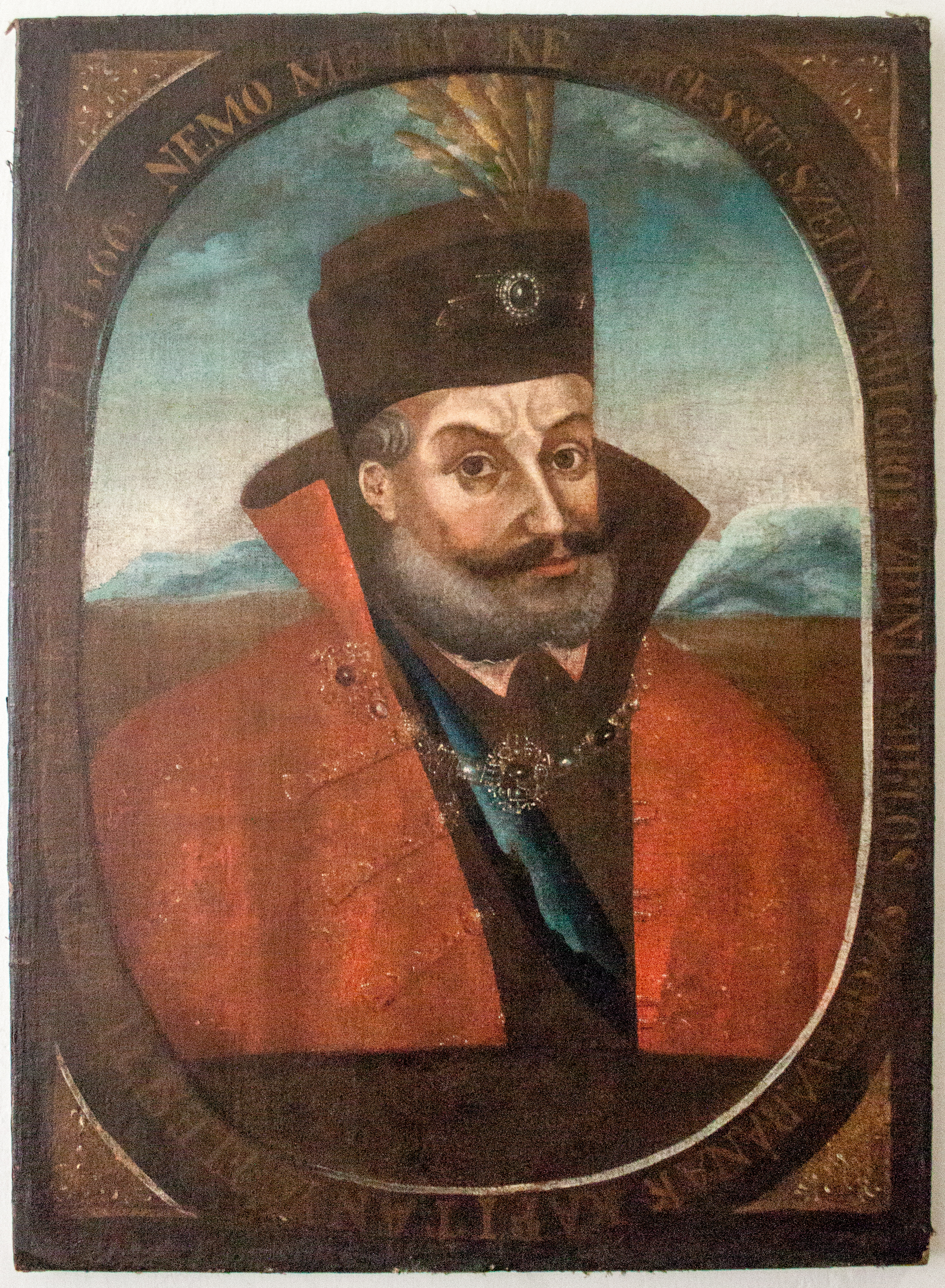
A portrait at East Slovak Museum, 18th century

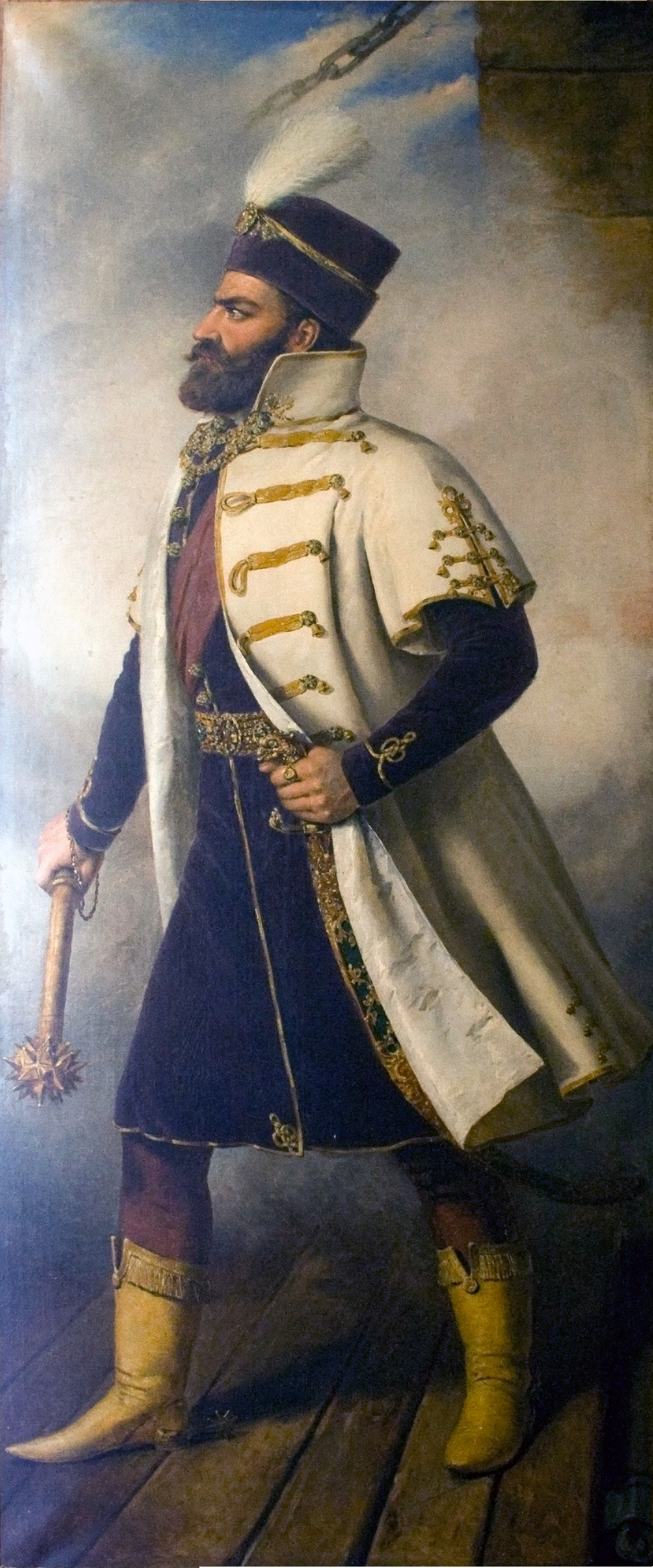
A portrait by Miklós Barabás, 1842

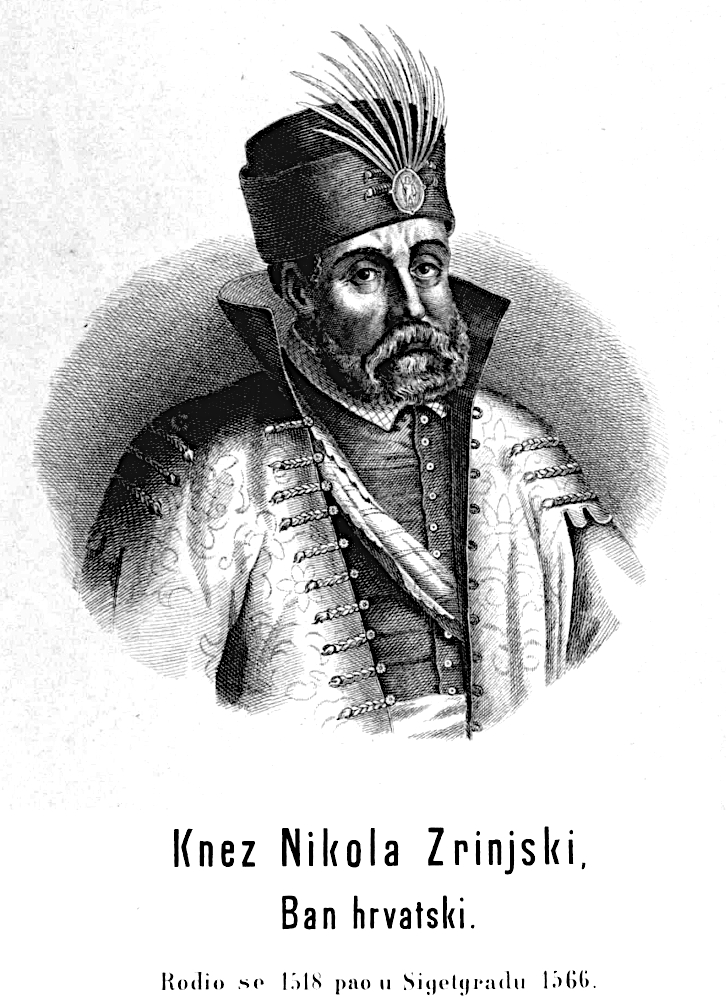
An old portrait of Nikola Šubić Zrinski by unknown author

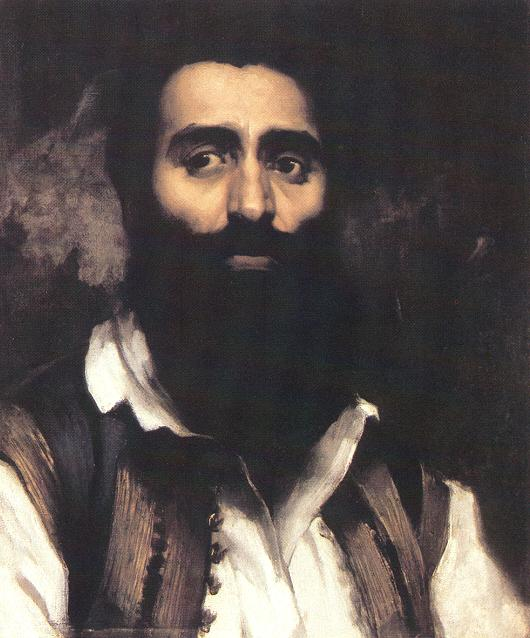
A portrait by Viktor Madarász, 1858

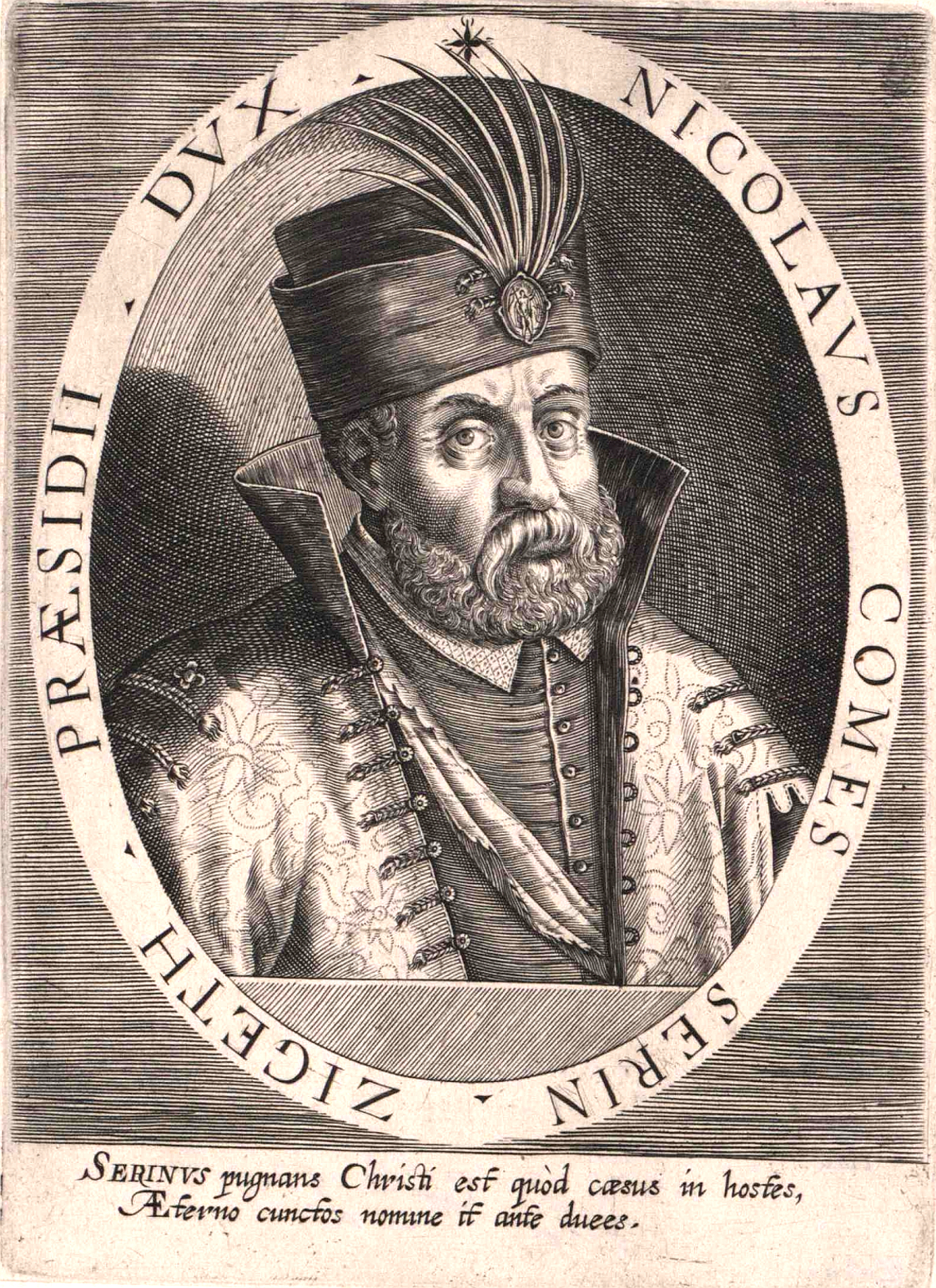
A portrait by Julije Hühn, 1866

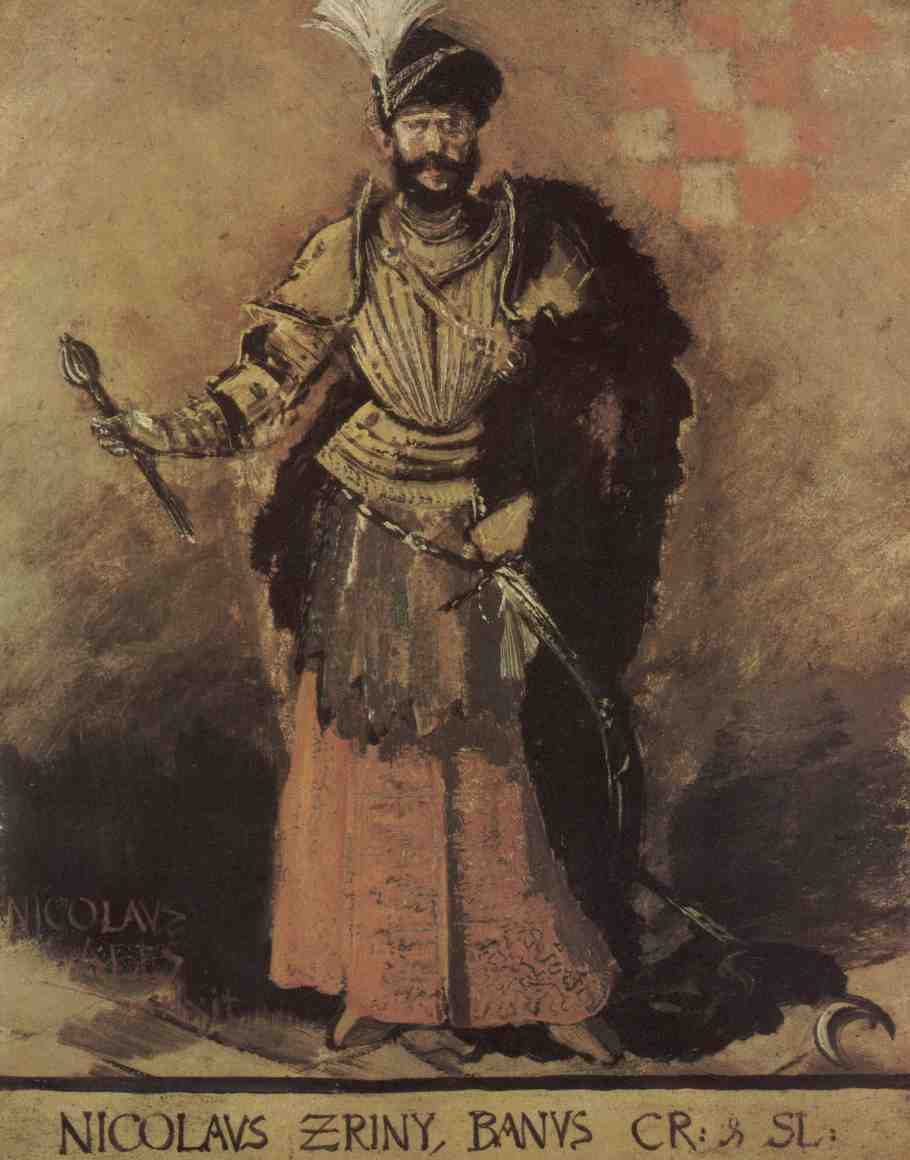
A portrait by Mikoláš Aleš, 1878

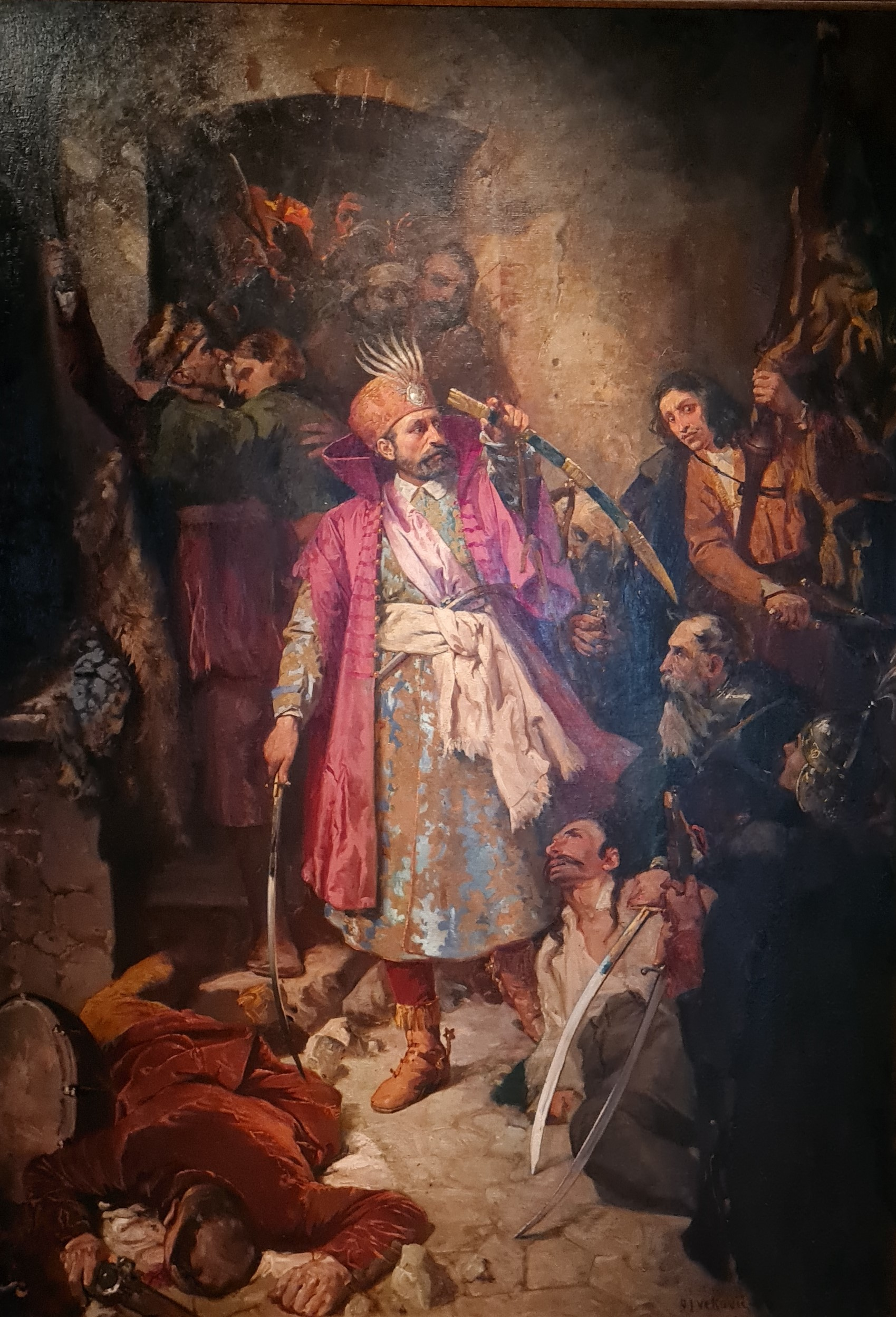
A portrait by Oton Iveković, 19th century

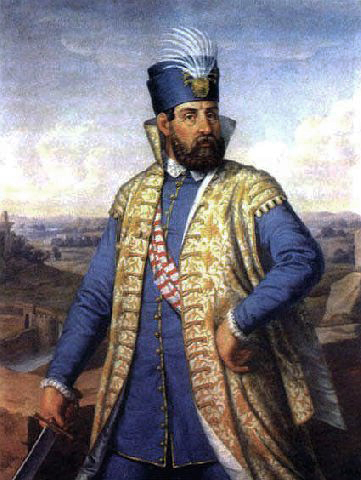
A portrait by J. F. Mucke, 19th century

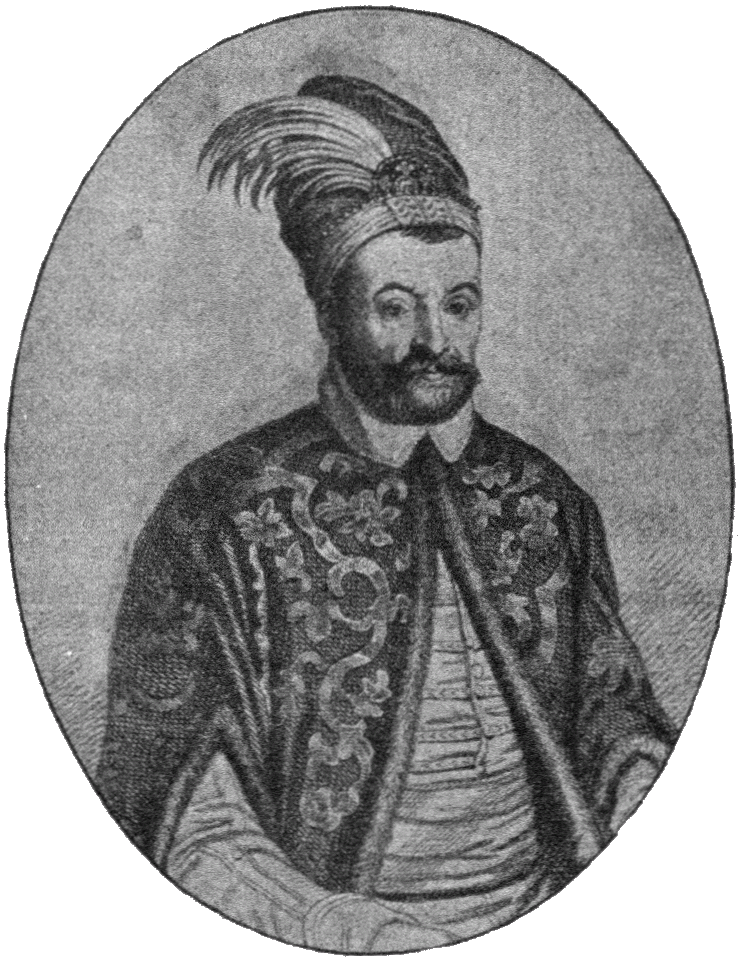
A portrait in Wiener Bilder, 1907

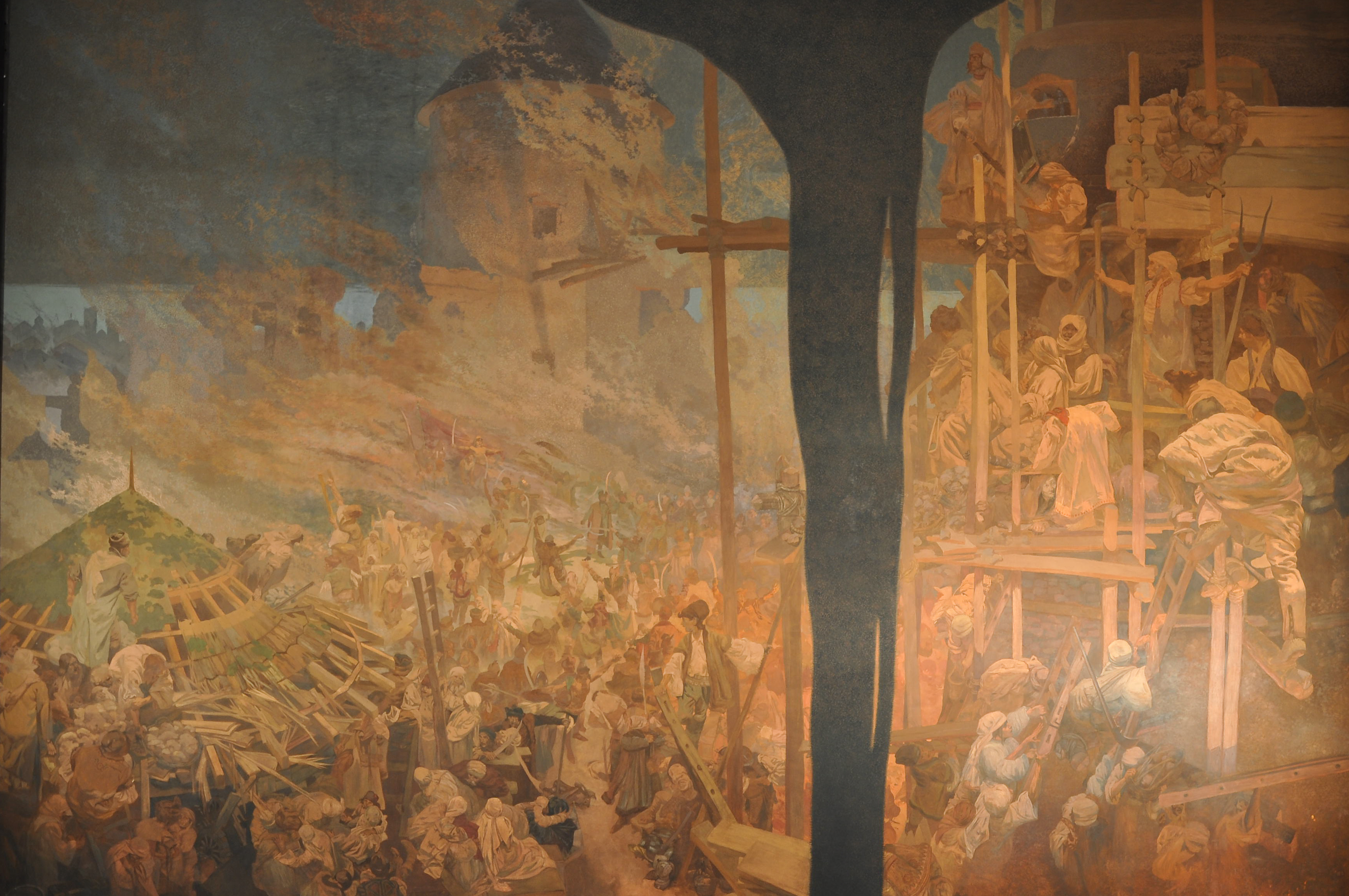
Defense of Sziget against the Turks by Nicholas Zrinsky (1914), by Alphonse Mucha, The Slav Epic

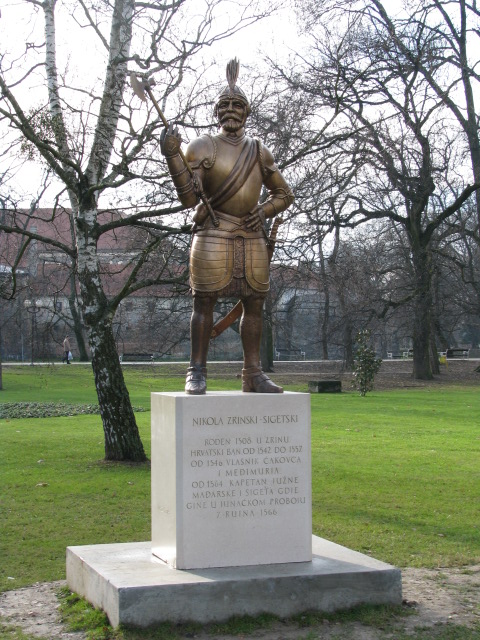
A sculpture of Zrinski in Čakovec

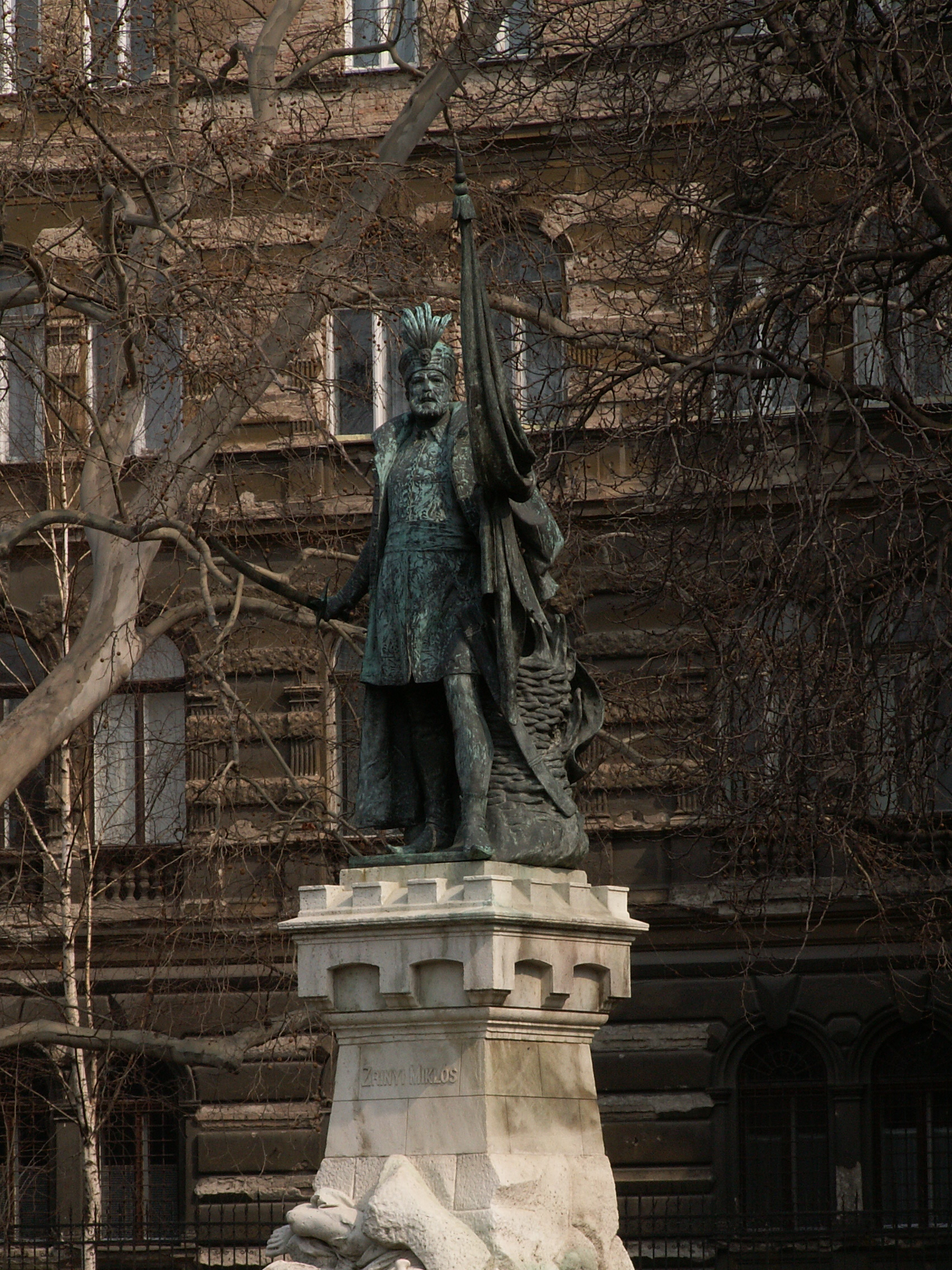
A sculpture of Zrinski at Kodály körönd, in Budapest

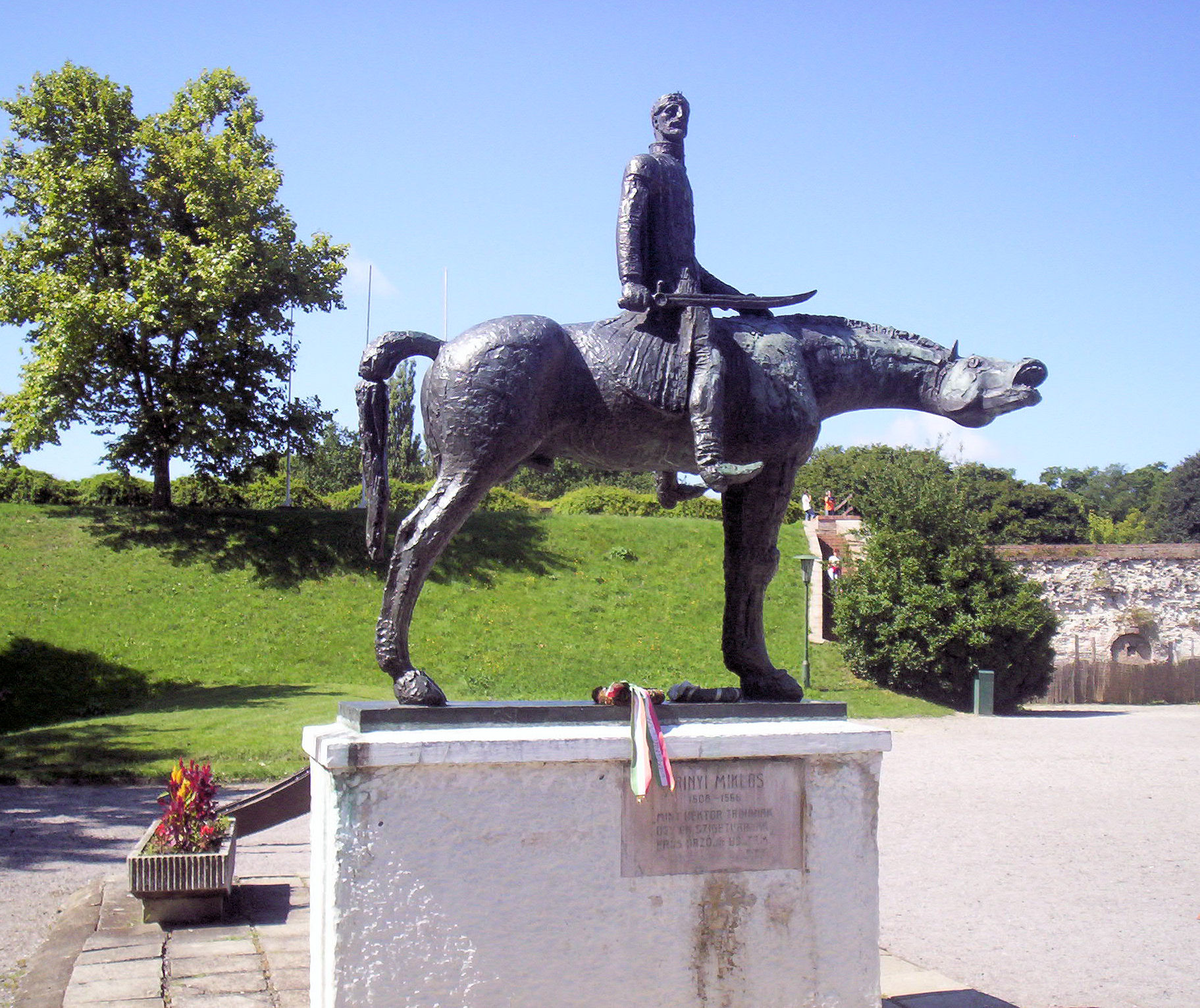
A modern sculpture of Zrinski in Szigetvár

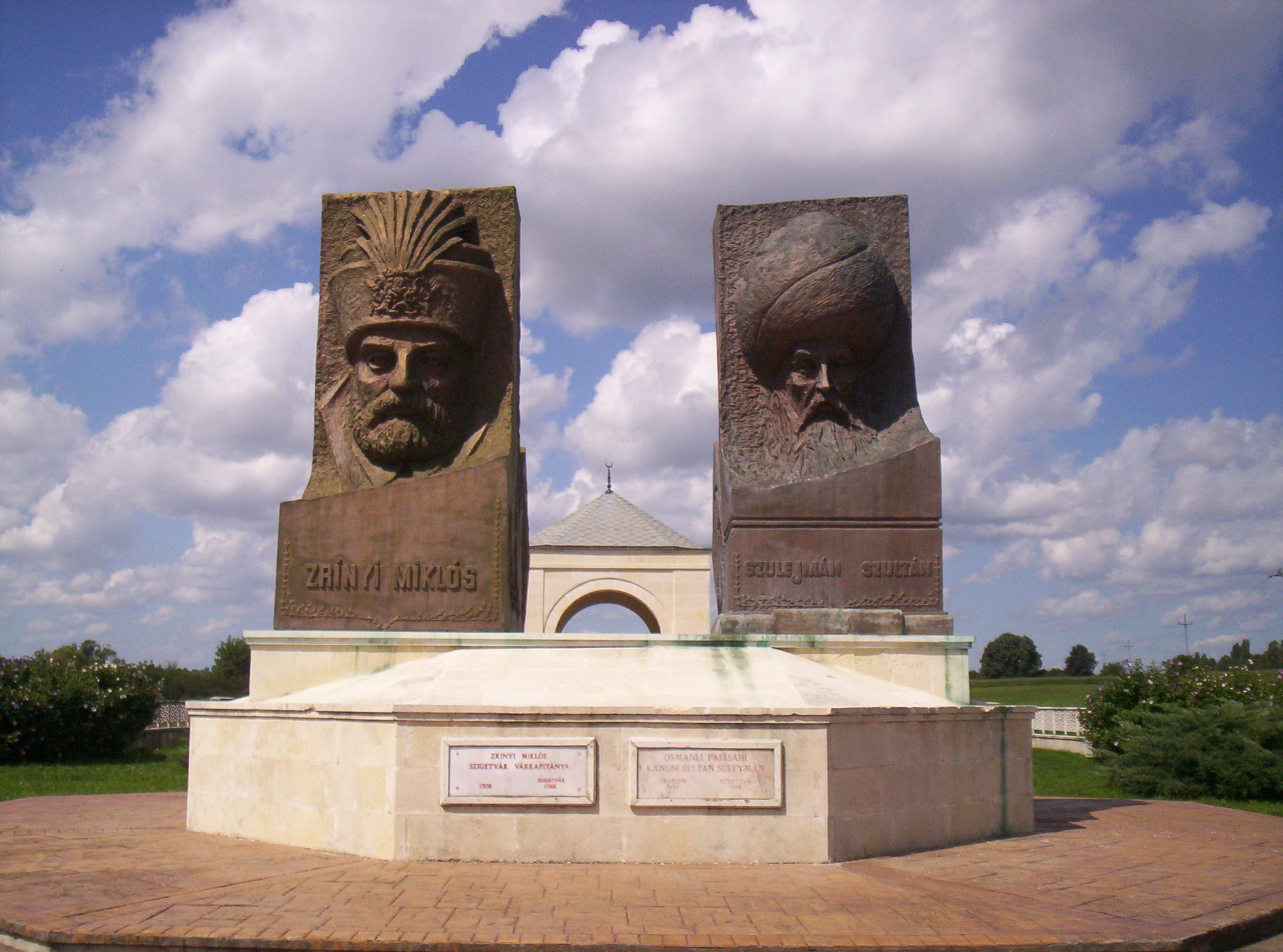
A bust of Zrinski at Hungarian-Turkish Friendship Park, in Szigetvár

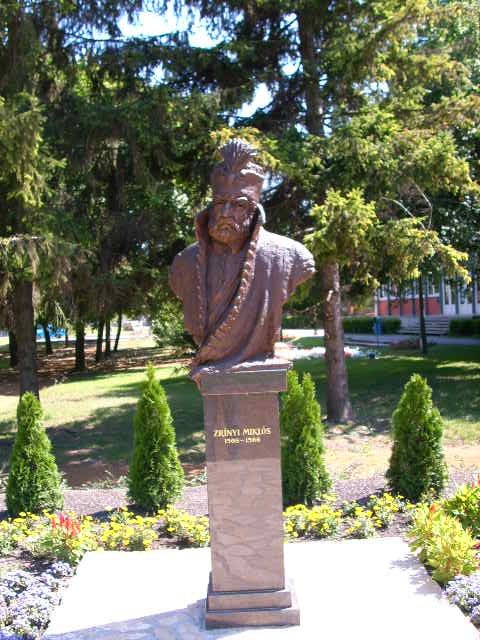
A bust of Zrinski in Szigetvár

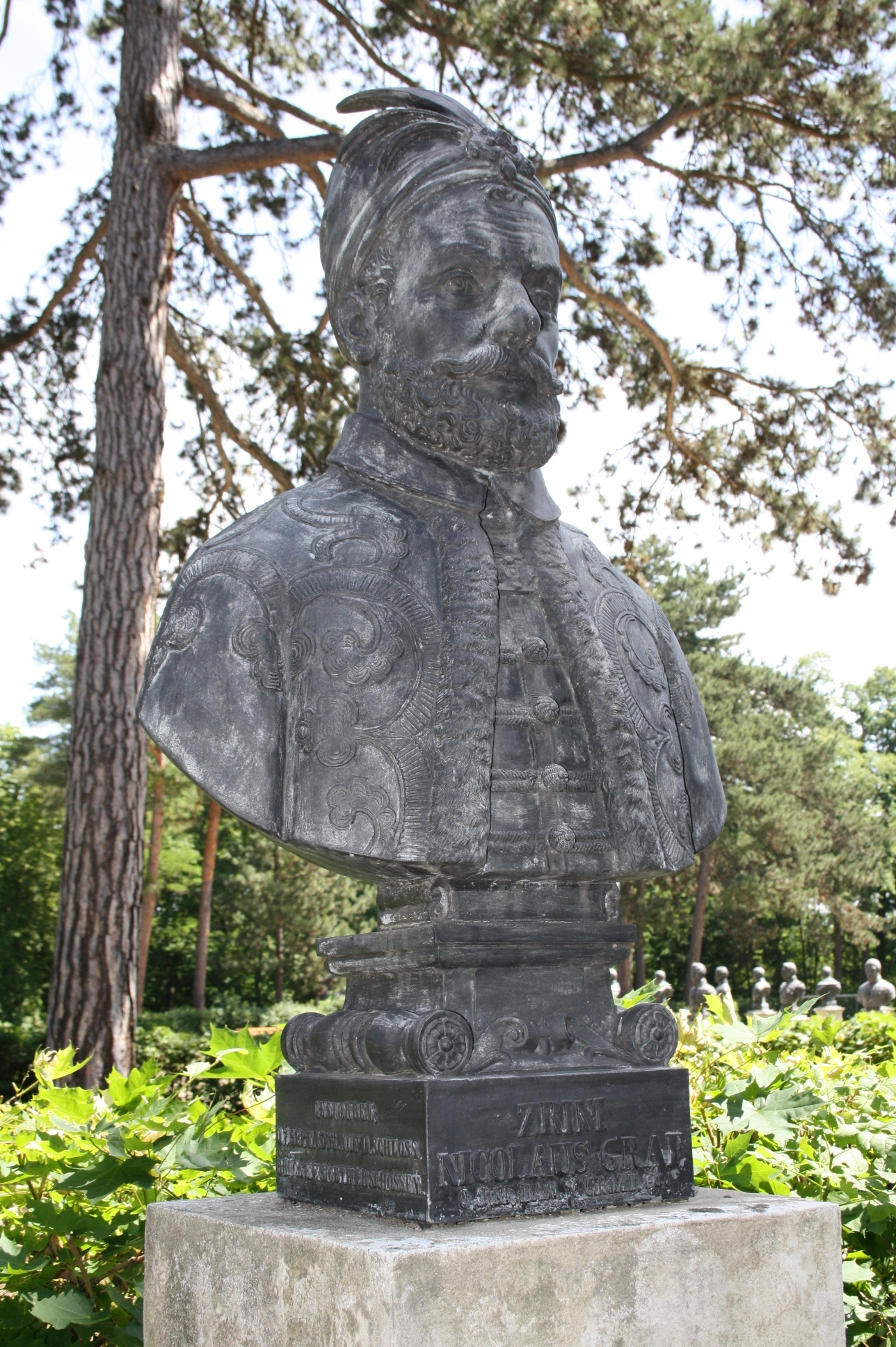
A bust of Zrinski in Heldenberg Memorial

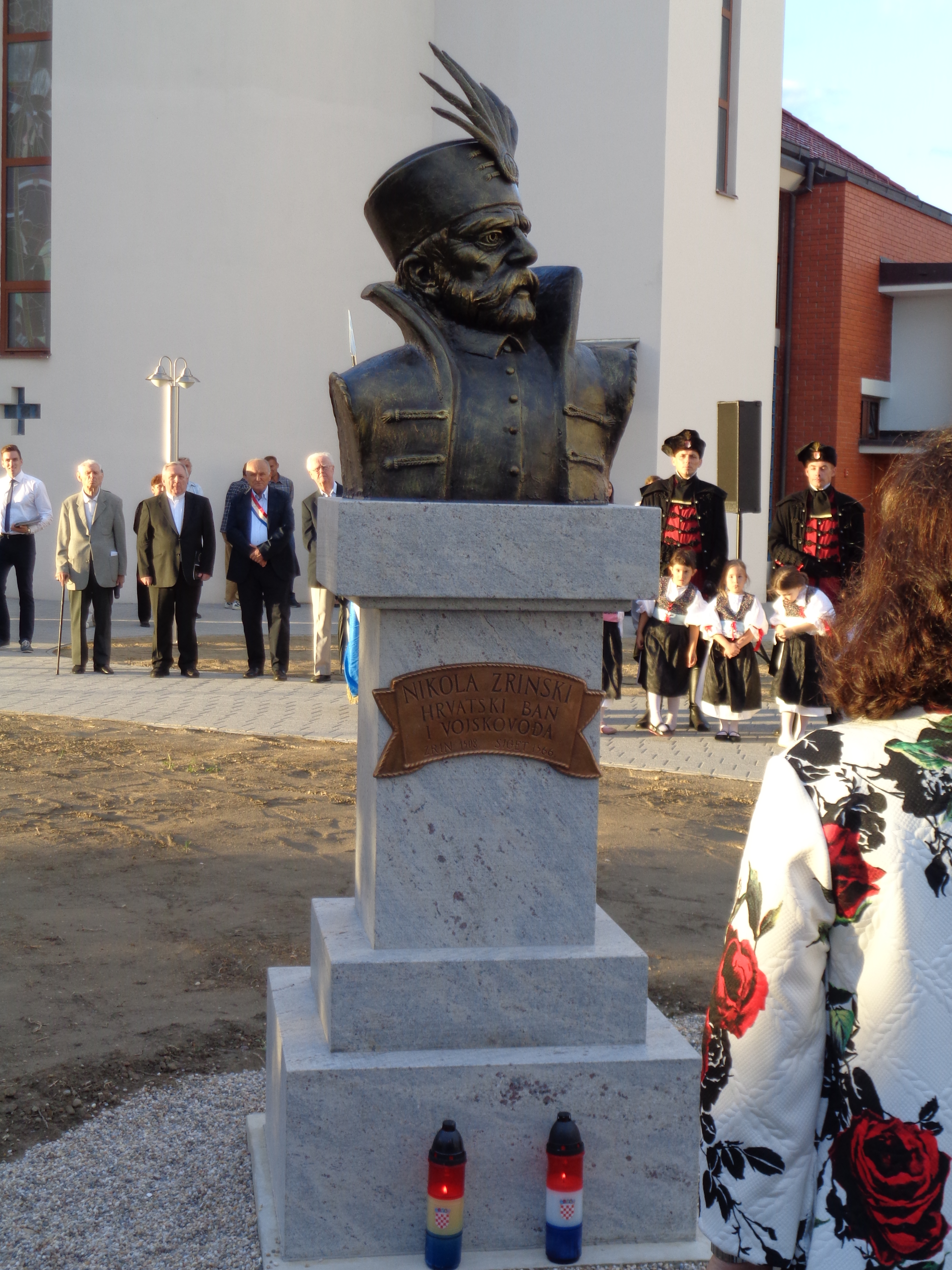
A bust of Zrinski for the 450th anniversary of the siege of Szigetvár, at Šenkovec, 2016

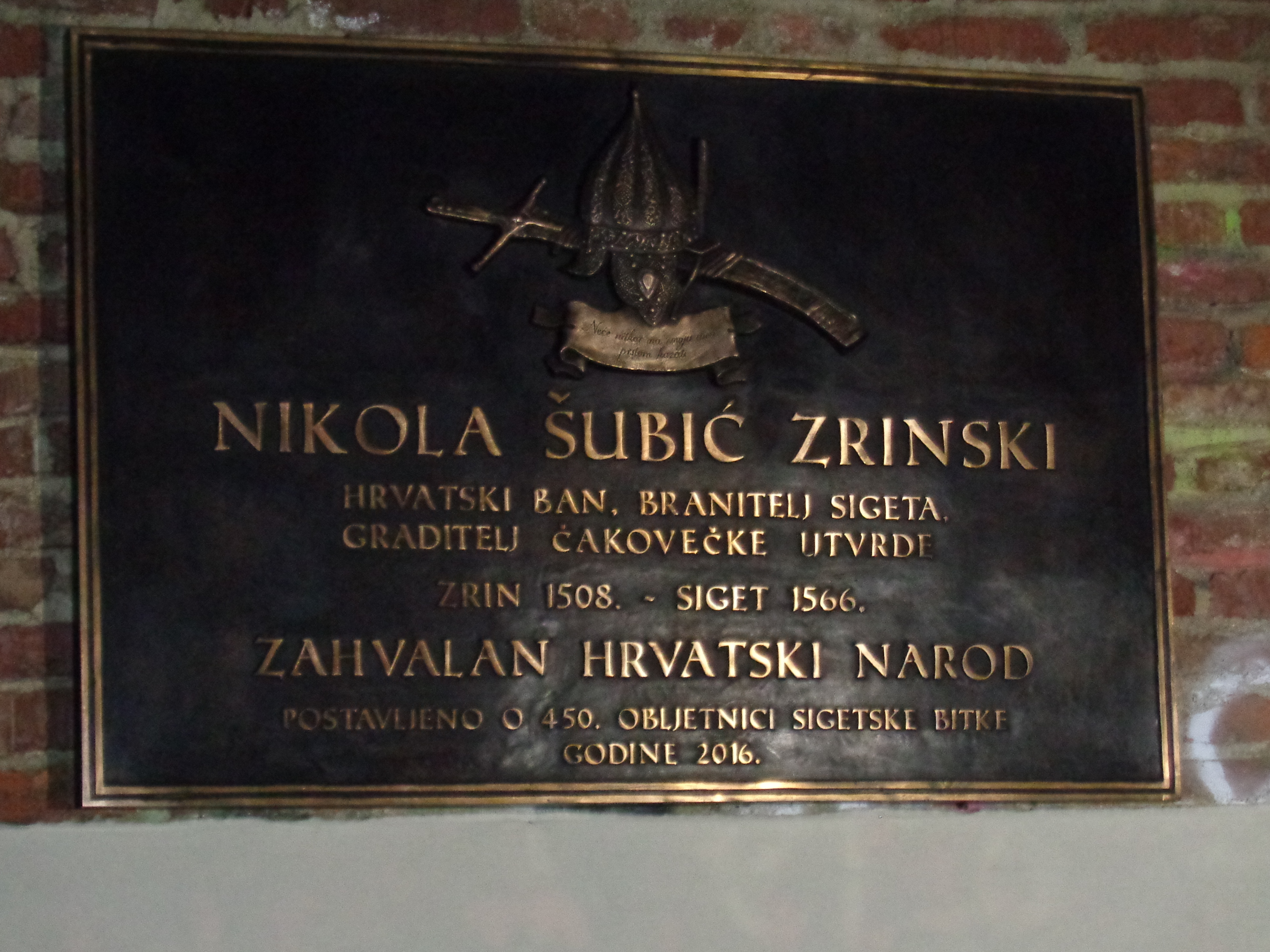
A plaque in honor to Zrinski for the 450th anniversary of the siege of Szigetvár, at Čakovec, 2016

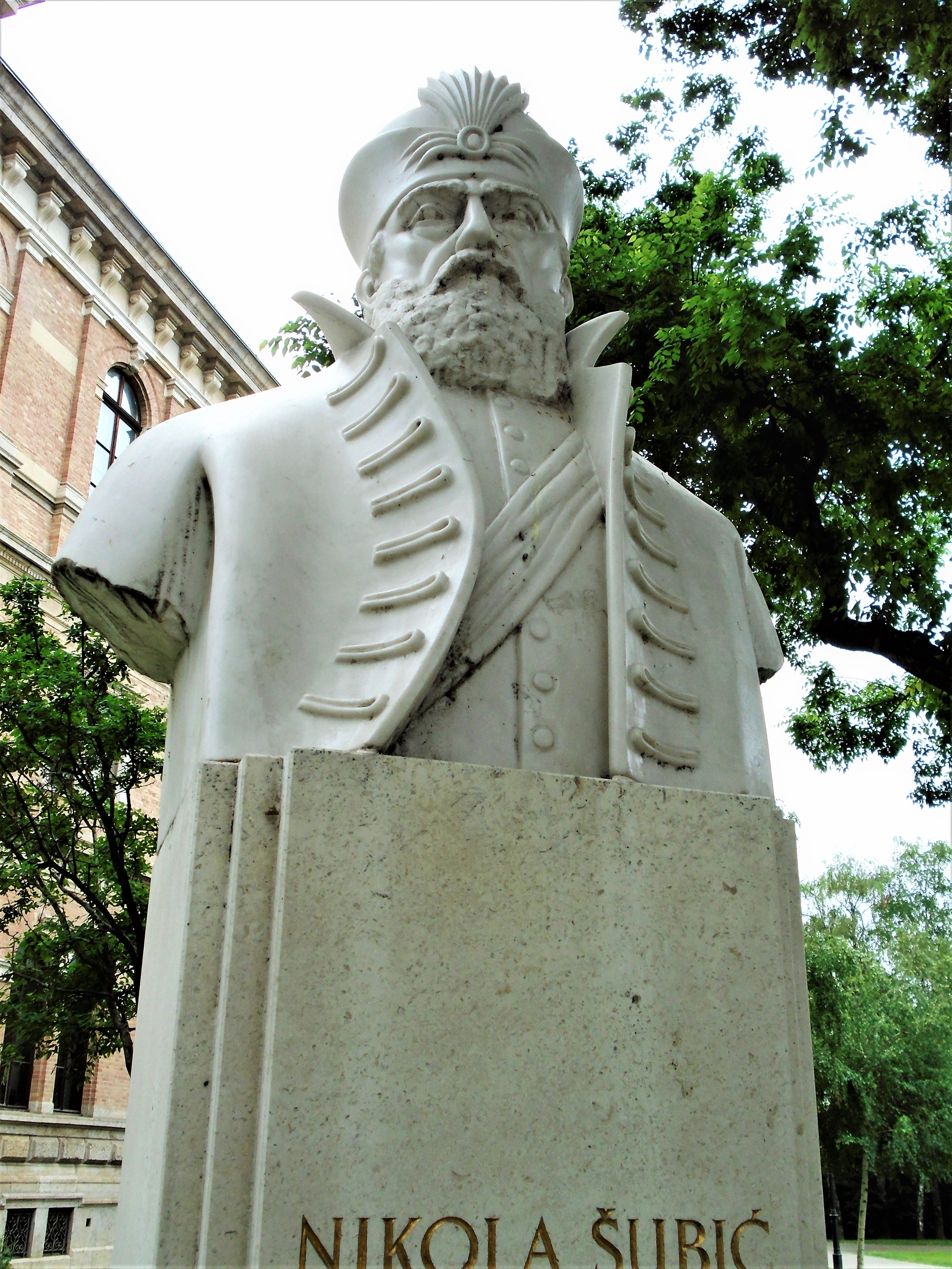
A bust of Nikola Šubić Zrinski in Zagreb

== Annotations ==
Nikola IV Zrinski House of Zrinski Born: 1507–1508 Died: 7 September 1566
Political offices
Preceded by Petar Keglević	Ban of Croatia; 1542–1556	Succeeded by Péter Erdődy
Preceded by Gábor Perényi	Master of the treasury 1557–1566	Succeeded by Juraj Zrinski
