= Ivan Zajc Croatian National Theatre =

Coordinates: 45.3242°N 14.4447°E

Croatian National Theatre Ivan pl. Zajc in Rijeka
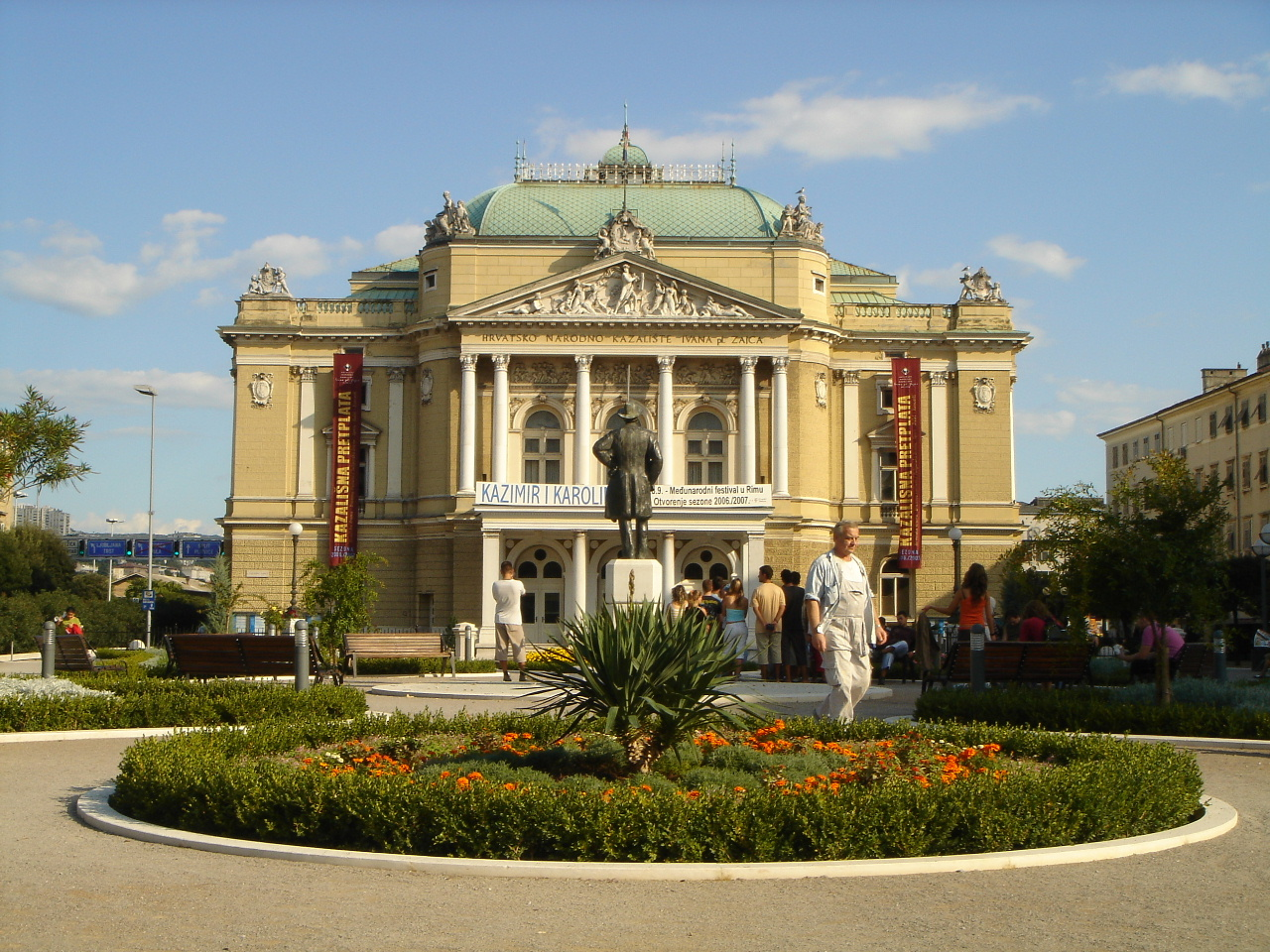
- Croatian National Theatre building in Rijeka
- Interactive map of Croatian National Theatre Ivan pl. Zajc in Rijeka
- Address: Uljarska 1 Rijeka; Croatia
- Owner: Republic of Croatia; City of Rijeka
- Type: National theatre, opera and ballet house

Construction
- Opened: 3 October 1885
- Architect: Fellner & Helmer

Website
- www.hnk-zajc.hr

The Croatian National Theatre Ivan pl. Zajc in Rijeka (Croatian: Hrvatsko narodno kazalište Ivana pl. Zajca Rijeka. Italian: Teatro Nazionale Croato Ivan de Zajc), commonly referred to as HNK Zajc, is a theatre, opera and ballet house located in Rijeka.

== Overview ==
The theater tradition in Rijeka is longer than two centuries. The first theater building in this city was erected in 1765, but at the end of the 18th century the construction of the new theater began, which opened in 1805 by renowned Rijeka citizen and trader Andrea Lodovico Adamich. Over the next 80 years the theater life in Rijeka took place in Theater Adamich, filled mostly by performances of Italian and less by German opera and drama groups. However, in the late 19th century several European theaters struck a fire, and in all the cities of the Habsburg monarchy began to take safety precautions, and Adamich Theatre did not meet the necessary conditions for normal operation. Rijeka municipal dealership decided to demolish the existing theater and build a brand new, modern and contemporary theater to suit Central European standards. In 1883 Rijeka city government, led by the famous mayor Giovanni Ciotta, the grandson of another legendary Lodovico Adamich, decided to raise a grand new theater building of Rijeka. It was decided that the theater will be built on what was then a vast Ürmeny square. The project was commissioned in Vienna, in a specialized studio for theater, with architects Herman Helmer and Ferdinand Fellner.

After two years of construction, the opening day of the new Municipal Theatre (Teatro Comunale) was on October 3, 1885. For this occasion, two great operas never before performed were prepared. They were Giuseppe Verdi's Aida and Amilcare Ponchielli's La Gioconda. On that day, the first visitors, numerous guests and invitees could enjoy the impressive theater building, a masterpiece of architecture of his time, whose figural plastic and ornamental work contributed by the famous Venetian sculptor Augusto Benvenuti and ceiling paintings painter Franz Matsch in cooperation with even more famous brothers, Ernst and Gustav Klimt.

In its rich history theater in Rijeka changed its name several times. After the Municipal (Teatro Comunale), the theatre was renamed, in 1913, to Teatro Verdi. However, due to historical and political circumstances (the city of Rijeka, at the time known as Fiume, became a Free State before passing to the Kingdom of Italy in 1924) the Croatian language and Croatian theater artists did not have access to the theater at all until the end of 1945 when, following the example of similar permanent national domestic and foreign theatrical institutions established permanent National Theatre in Rijeka, the Croatian drama, Italian drama and opera and ballet. On October 20, 1946, after passing to Yugoslavia, a show played on its stage in Croatian for the first time. It was Ivan Gundulić's Dubravka, directed by Matko Foteza with Marija Crnobori in the role of Dubravka. It was soon followed by the first performance of an opera and ballet, Zajc's Nikola Subic Zrinjski, conducted by Boris Papandopulo, and the title role sung Milan Pichler. The first play of the Italian drama was Goldoni's Il burbero benefico. In the year 1953 the theater gets a new name after another one composer, but this time the biggest Croatian and a fellow citizen of Rijeka, Ivan Zajc.

Since 1991 theater got the status of national theater, and in 1994 its present name, Croatian National Theatre Ivan pl. Zajc. From the historical 1946 to today, with its four artistic branches (Croatian Drama, Italian Drama, the Symphonic Opera and ballet) and more than 50 years of their continuous operation, with its quality performance HNK in Rijeka managed to set high theatrical and artistic criteria and placed itself on the rightful place of one of the by quality leading theaters in Croatia. At the same time, his repertoire today is characterized by performances of drama, opera and ballet classics as well as works of Croatian dramatic and operatic heritage and also first performances of the national acts, especially contemporary.

All the major Croatian theaters were built in the second half of the 19th century, including the one in Rijeka - behind Osijek (1865), and before Split (1893) and Zagreb (1895).

On 20 March, due to the ongoing coronavirus pandemic, the Croatian National Theatre Ivan pl. Zajc in Rijeka started with an online virtual program Zajc With You on their YouTube channel, as an act responsibility and in solidarity with its audience, citizens of Rijeka and the wider community, especially those most vulnerable ones, either because of their age or because they are "on the front line of defense against the virus". Some ensembles will not continue their regular and usual work, because it involves gathering of more people, such as orchestras or choirs, and physical contact, such as ballet ensembles. The daily program has the following content and layout:

- 08:00 AM - Morning selfie poetry - one actor of Croatian or Italian drama reads poetry.
- 12:00 PM - Aria at noon - a soloist of the opera ensemble performs one aria.
- 08:00 PM - "Zajčić"("Bunny") for a good night - Actors of Croatian and Italian Drama tell children a good night's story.
- 10:00 PM - Ballet insomnia - a short dance video: ballet practice, solos, choreographic fragments (at a safe distance).

== Administration ==
- Intendant: Dubravka Vrgoč
- Business director: Martina Radelja (Jasmina Šegon)
- Director of Ballet: Maša Kolar
- Director of Croatian Drama: Renata Carola Gatica
- Director of Italian Drama: Giulio Settimo

== Bibliography ==
- Nensi Giachin Marsetić, Il Dramma Italiano: storia della compagnia teatrale della Comunità nazionale italiana dal 1946 al 2003, Volume 9 di Etnia / Centro di ricerche storiche, Rovinj (HR). ISSN 0353-3271
- Andreas Leben, Alenka Koron (herausgeber), Literarische Mehrsprachigkeit im österreichischen und slowenischen Kontext, Tübingen (DE), Narr Francke Attempto, 2019. ISBN 978-3-7720-8676-2
- La Confraternita del Chianti, Pentateuco, CUE Press, 2019 Imola. (IT) ISBN 9788855100649
- Chiara Boscaro, Marco Di Stefano, Verso Est: La città che sale, L'ultimo giorno di scuola, Effetto farfalla, La ricerca della simmetria, Spoleto (IT), Editoria & Spettacolo, 2021. ISBN 9788832068313
