= Siege of Pest =

Siege during Ottoman–Habsburg wars

- Part of the Habsburg–Ottoman war of 1540–1547
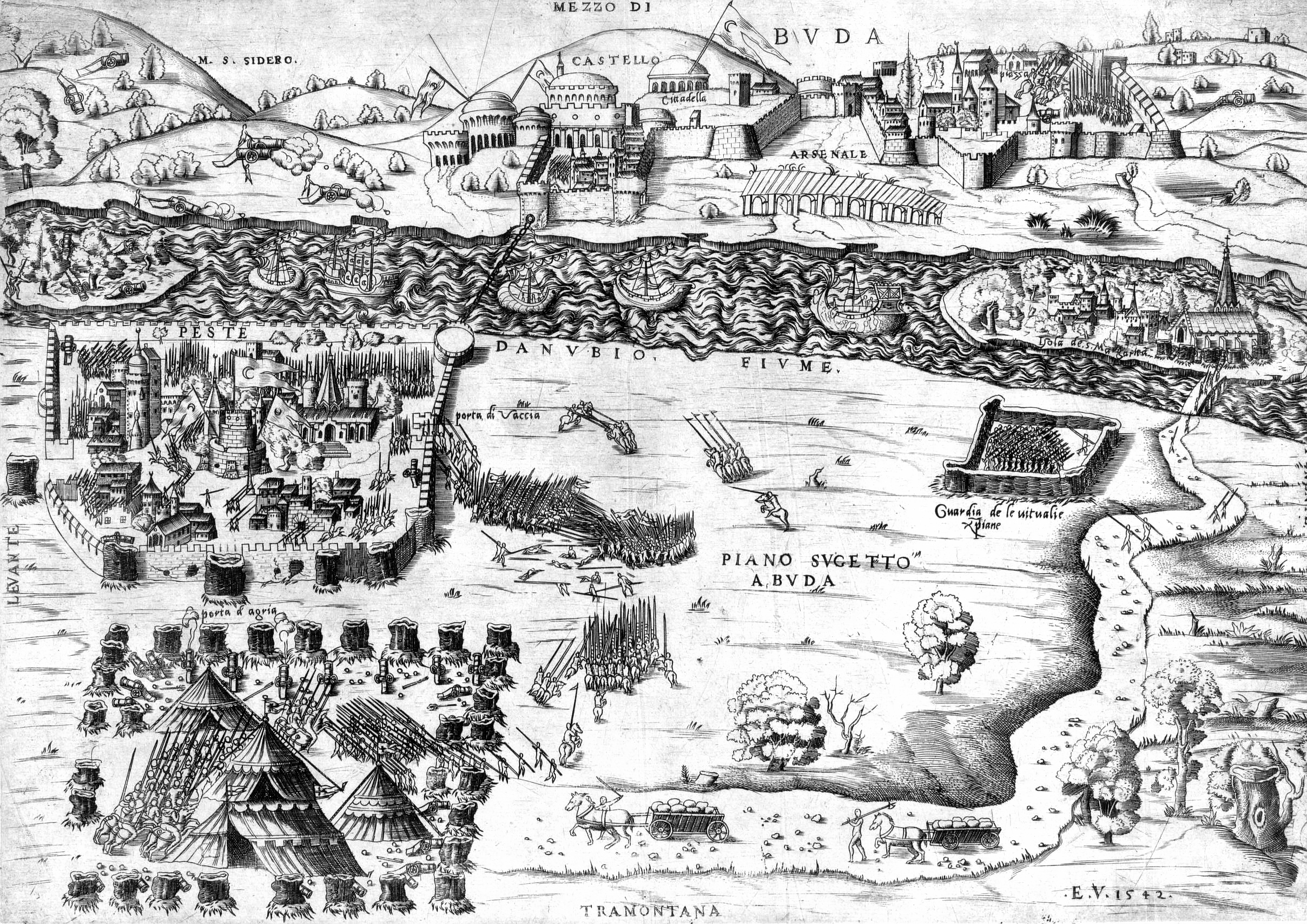
- Siege of Pest, after Enea Vico, 1542
Date	1542
Location	Buda and Pest, Hungary (Budapest)
Result	Ottoman victory, Ottomans repulse Habsburgs

Belligerents
Ottoman Empire	Holy Roman Empire; Kingdom of Hungary; Kingdom of Croatia; Papal States; Duchy of Milan; Republic of Venice

Commanders and leaders
Suleiman the Magnificent	Joachim Brandenburg; Alessandro Vitelli; Hans von Ungnad; Nikola IV Zrinski

Strength
2,000 Janissaries, 10,000 Sipahi and irregular troops	~60,000 soldiers, 60 guns

Casualties and losses
Unknown	Heavy

The siege of Pest (modern city of Budapest, Hungary) occurred in 1542, when Ferdinand I attempted to recover the cities of Buda and Pest in 1542 from the Ottoman Empire. They had been occupied by the Ottomans under Suleiman since the siege of Buda (1541).

The siege was led by Joachim of Brandenburg. The siege was repulsed by the Ottomans, who would remain in control of central Hungary for the following 150 years.
