= U boj, u boj =

Croatian Battle Hymn

"U boj, u boj" (Croatian for "To battle, to battle") is a Croatian patriotic song. It was written by Franjo Marković and composed by Ivan Zajc in 1866, who later incorporated it as an aria into his opera Nikola Šubić Zrinski (1876) where it is sung by a male choir. It is a retelling of the Battle of Szigetvár of 1566, in which Nikola IV Zrinski, Ban of Croatia and captain of the assembled Croatian and Hungarian forces, took a heroic last stand against overwhelming Ottoman forces, led personally by Suleiman the Magnificent. Though the fortress fell, the defenders inflicted grievous injuries on the assaulting forces, all but crippling the victors' ability to progress past the Croatian-Hungarian border, and causing the death of the sultan himself.

The choir version of the song enjoys a wide popularity in Japan where for a long time it was thought to be a Czech folk song. After the end of World War I, the American ship Heffron, evacuating Czech and Slovak soldiers from Siberia, among whom this Croat song was widely popular during the war, was damaged by a storm and was forced to settle in the Kobe harbour for 2 months for repair. During that period, the soldiers passed on the tune to the members of the oldest and the most renowned Japanese male choir of the Kwansei Gakuin University, established in 1899. Their repertoire hosts the song (which is learned not in Japanese, but in genuine Croatian) to this day, ending with it each of their public performances.

== Text ==
U boj, u boj!
Mač iz toka, braćo,
nek dušman zna kako mremo mi!

Grad naš već gori,
stiže do nas već žar:
rik njihov ori,
bijesan je njihov jar!

K'o požar taj grudi naše plamte,
utiša rik mača naših zvek!

K'o bratac brata
Zrinskog poljub'te svi!
Za njim na vrata,
vjerni junaci vi!

Sad, braćo!
Pun'mo puške, samokrese,
naše grome, naše trijese,
neka ore, ruše, more!
Brus'mo ljute naše mače,
neka sijeku jače, jače!

Sad zbogom bud',
dome naš zauvijek,
oj, zbogom,
od svud i svud
na te dušman ide prijek.
I već u grob
sveti trup sklada tvoj,
al' neće!
Za te sin svak u boj se kreće!
Dome naš, ti vijekom stoj!

Hajd' u boj, u boj!
Za dom, za dom sad u boj!
Ma paklena množ
na nj diže svoj nož;
Hajd' u boj!
Nas mal, al' hrabar je broj!
Tko, tko će ga strt'?
Smrt vragu, smrt!

Za domovinu mrijeti kolika slast!
Prot dušmaninu! Mora on mora past'!

To battle, to battle!
Unsheathe your swords, brethren,
Let the foe see how we die!

Our city already burns,
The heat is already reaching us:
Their roar resounds,
Their rage is rampant!

Our chests flare up as that fire,
The roar is silenced by the rattling of our swords!

Like brothers,
All of you, kiss Zrinski
Follow him to the gates,
You, faithful heroes!

Now, brothers!
Load the rifles, pistols,
Our thunders, our bang,
Let them roar, topple, harry!
Let us grind our fierce swords,
Make them cut harder, harder!

Good bye and be well,
Our home, forever now,
Oh, farewell,
From everywhere around us
Cruel enemy is upon you
Already they plan
To bury your sacred body,
But they won't!
All your sons move to fight for you!
Our home, you will stand forever!

To battle! To battle!
For our home, for our home now to battle!
Even as infernal host
Raises its blade at it;
Come to battle!
We are few, but fearless!
Who will crush him?
Death to the devil, death!

To die for your homeland is such delight!
Against our foe! He must, he must fall!
