= Nikola Šubić Zrinski (opera) =

Nikola Šubić Zrinjski
- Opera by Ivan Zajc
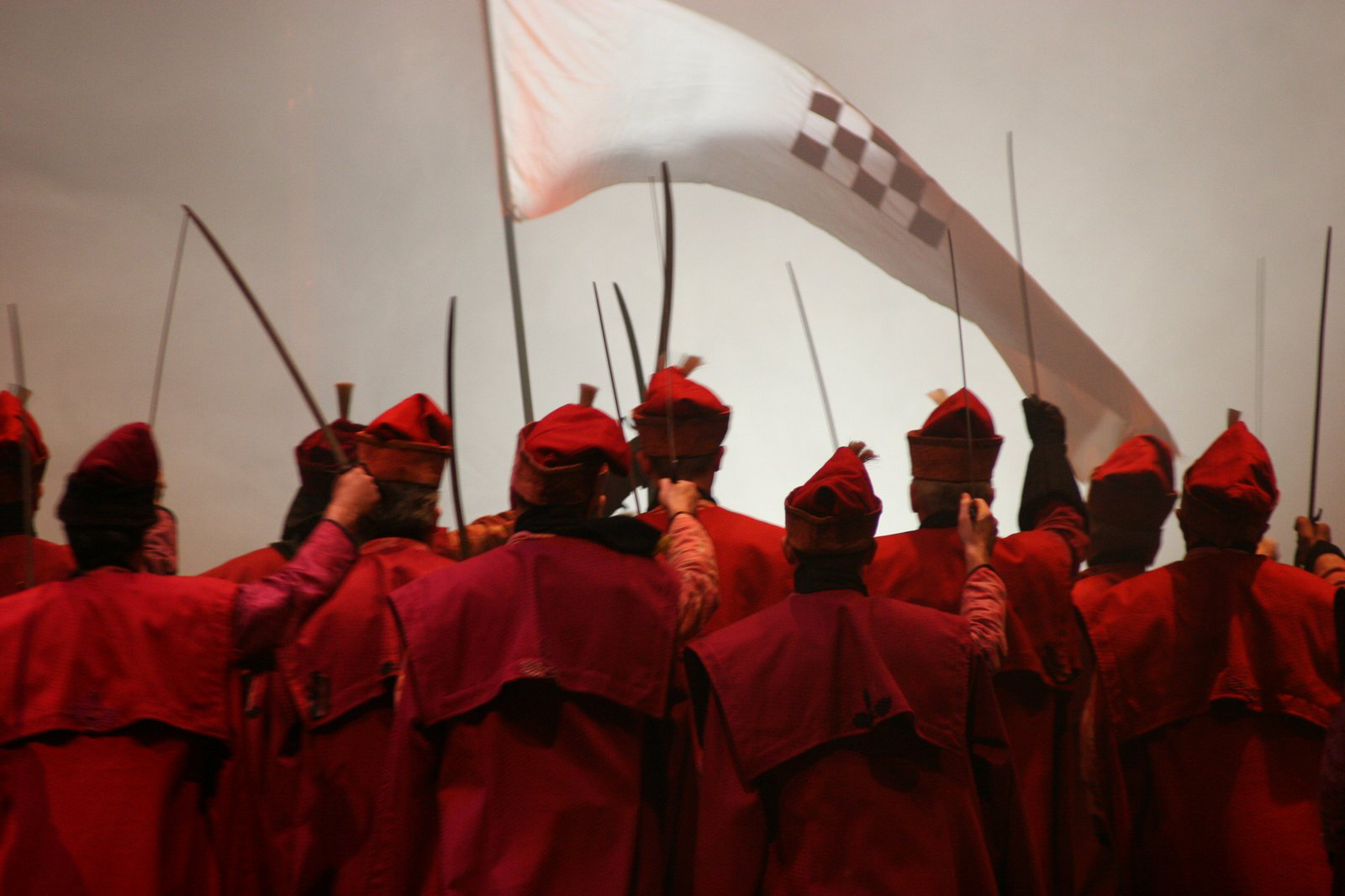
- A performance of Nikola Šubić Zrinski in Croatian National Theatre Ivan pl. Zajc in Rijeka
- Language: Croatian
- Based on: Battle of Szigetvár
- Premiere: 4 November 1876; People's Theatre, Zagreb

Nikola Šubić Zrinjski is an opera written and composed by Ivan Zajc in 1876. It is a retelling of the Battle of Szigetvár of 1566, in which Nikola IV Zrinski, Ban of Croatia and captain of the assembled Croatian and Hungarian forces, took a heroic last stand against overwhelming Ottoman forces, led personally by Suleiman the Magnificent. Though the fortress fell, the defenders inflicted grievous injuries on the assaulting forces, all but crippling the victors' ability to progress past the Croatian-Hungarian border, and causing the death of the sultan himself.

The opera premiered in Zagreb on 4 November 1876 at what was then the People's Theater housed in the present-day Old City Hall building. It was well received by audiences and critics alike. Its enduring fame is due in large part to its climactic chorus, "U boj, u boj!" (To battle, to battle!), written by the composer ten years prior to the rest of the opera.

Nikola Šubić Zrinjski remains a staple of the opera repertoire, having seen a total of 682 performances as of 2010. It has achieved lasting popularity as a Croatian patriotic song, removed from the context of the opera, as well as a Japanese glee club staple.

Its recordings include one conducted by Milan Sachs.

== See also ==
- Battle of Szigetvár – the 1566 battle which the opera is based on
- Siege of Sziget – 17th-century Hungarian epic poem about the battle
