= Matthias Zündt =

German engraver (1498–1586)

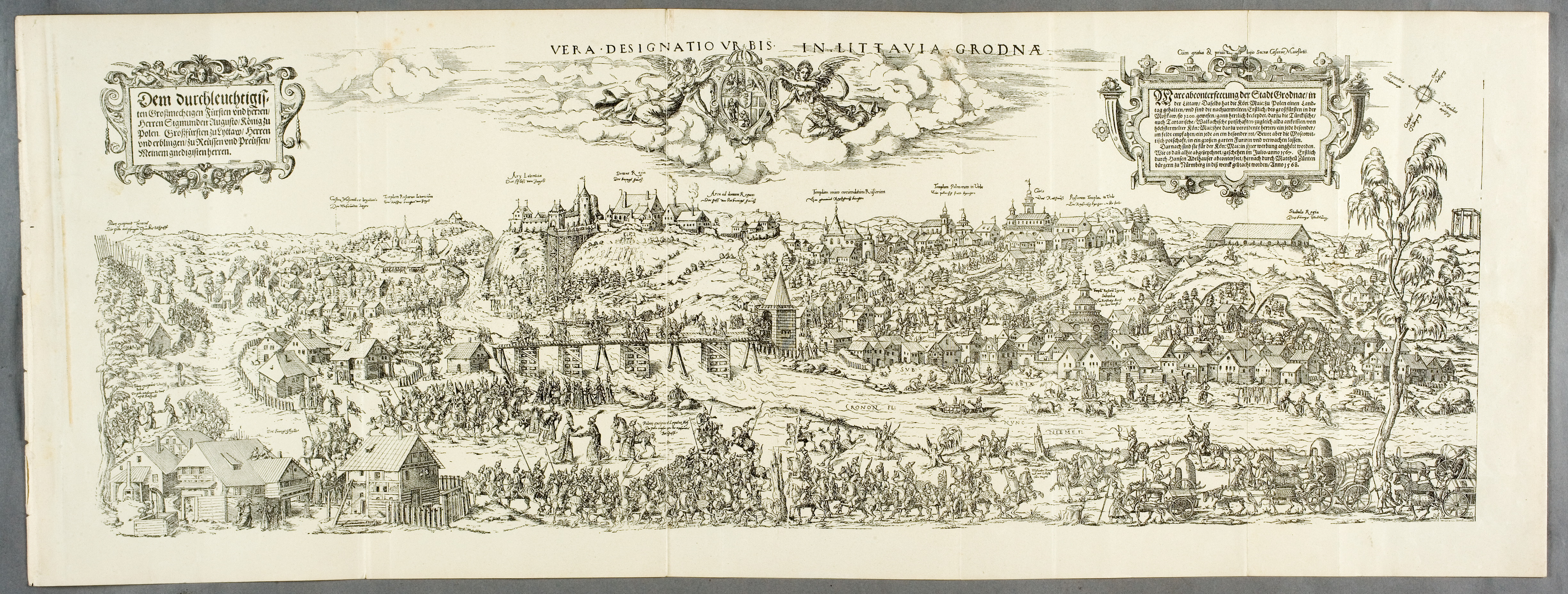
View of the city of Grodno, in the Grand Duchy of Lithuania, 1568

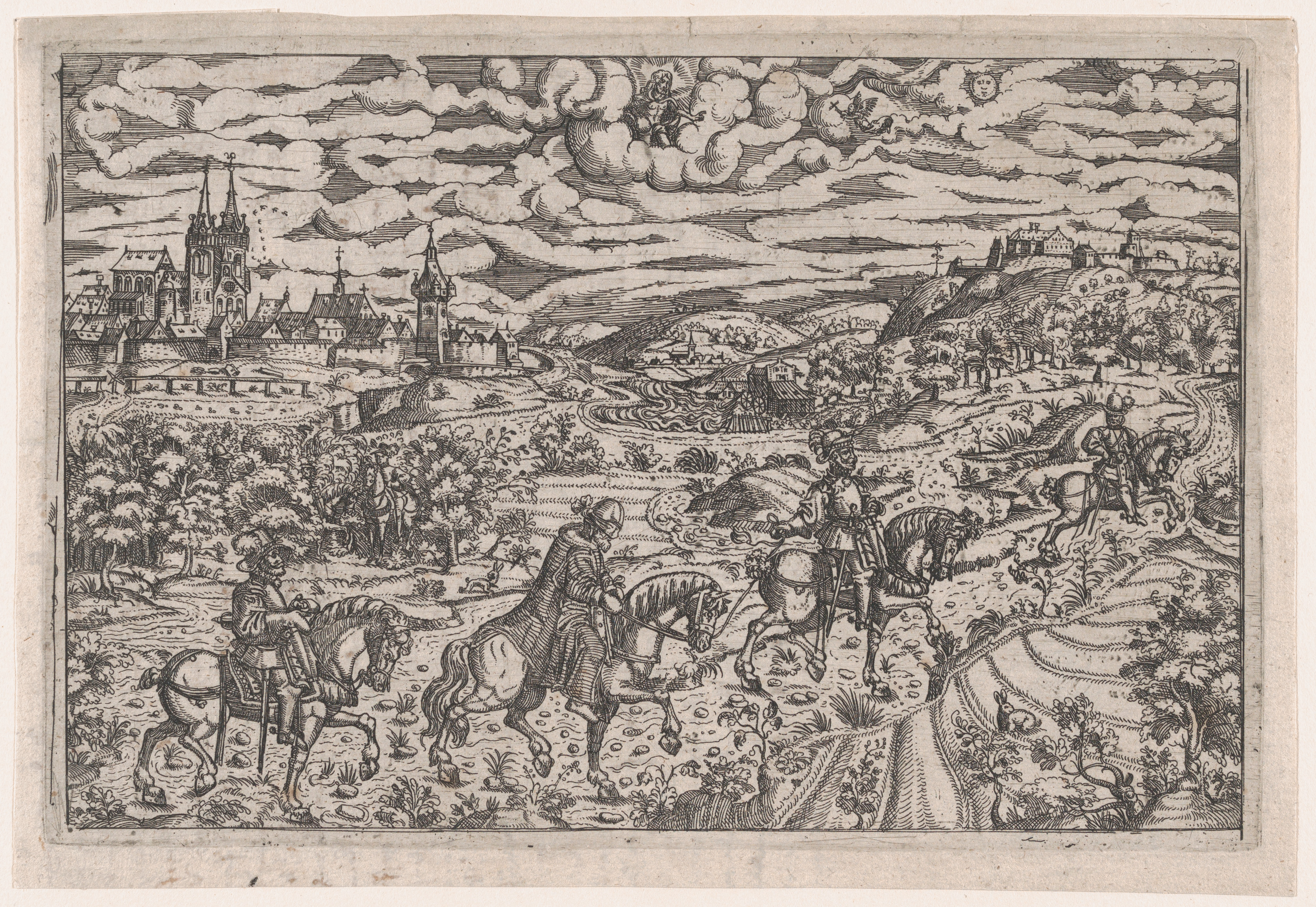
Albrecht von Rosenberg abducting Hieronymus Paumgartner

Matthias Zündt (sometimes Zynndt; 1498–1586) was a German engraver, born at Nuremberg. He worked with both the graver and point, and produced portraits, Scripture subjects, allegories, and crests. Brulliot mentions an etching with a mark supposed to be his; it represents a Vase with figures of Tritons, standing on sea-horses' feet, and surmounted by a figure of Neptune. Bartsch describes these three prints by him:

- Portrait of Giovanni de Raleta, Grand Master of the Knights of Malta, 1566.
- Portrait of Louis III de Bourbon-Conde, 1568.
- View of the city of Grodno, in Lithuania, 1568.
