= Ivan Zajc =

Croatian composer, conductor, director, and teacher (1832–1914)

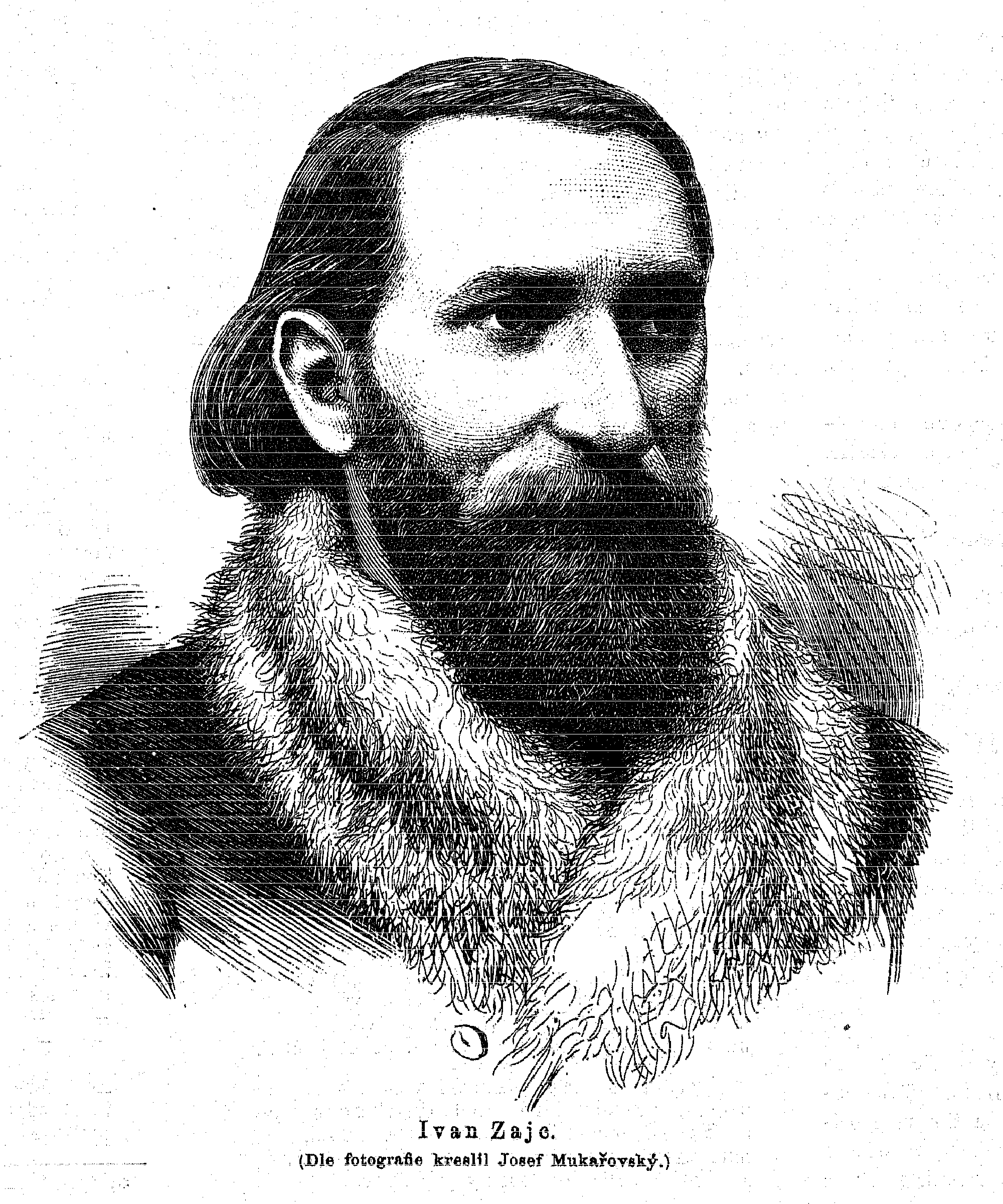
- Born: 3 August 1832; Fiume, Austrian Empire (now Rijeka, Croatia)
- Died: 16 December 1914 (aged 82); Zagreb, Austria-Hungary (now Croatia)
- Occupation: Conductor

Ivan von Zajc (also Croatian: Ivan plemeniti Zajc, Italian: Giovanni de Zaytz; pronounced [ǐʋan zâjts]; August 3, 1832 – December 16, 1914) was a Croatian composer, conductor, director, and teacher who dominated Croatia's musical culture for over forty years. Through his artistic and institutional reform efforts, he is credited with its revitalization and refinement, paving the way for new Croatian musical achievements in the 20th century. He is often called the Croatian Verdi.

== Life ==
=== Childhood years ===
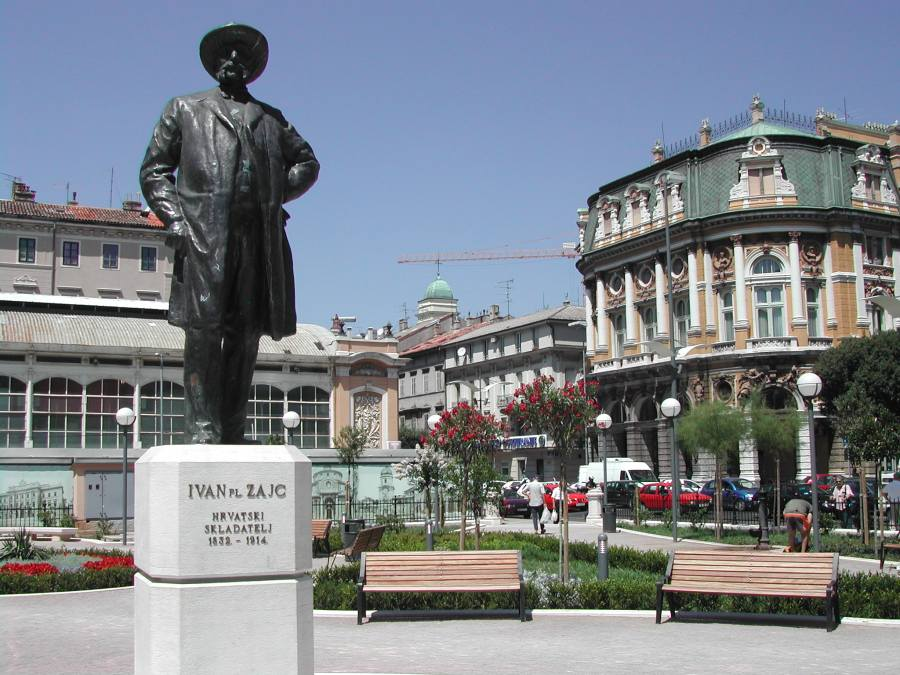
A monument to Ivan Zajc in Rijeka

Ivan Dragutin Stjepan Zajc was born in Fiume, Austrian Empire (modern-day Rijeka, Croatia). His family migrated from Pressburg, Kingdom of Hungary (now Bratislava, Slovakia); his father, Johann Zaytz (Jan Nepomuk Zajitz), was of Czech descent, and his mother, Anna Bodensteiner was of German descent. His musical talent was evident very early on in his life, as he began to study the piano and violin at the age of five, performed in public by the age of six, and even began to compose his own music by the age of twelve. Nevertheless, despite his early musical success, his military bandmaster father was opposed to the idea of a career in music and wanted him to study law instead following the completion of his secondary education. In the end, Zajc's professors prevailed and he entered the Milan Conservatory in 1850 with his father's consent.

=== Early success in Milan and Vienna ===
Zajc studied in Milan from 1850 to 1855, under the supervision of Stefano Ronchetti-Monteviti (counterpoint and composition), Alberto Mazzucato (orchestration), and Lauro Rossi (dramatic music). During this period, Zajc took his studies very seriously and regularly won prizes as one of the conservatory's most talented students. He was awarded first prize at his graduation examination for the opera La Tirolese (1855), which was performed on stage in the same year. Zajc's future as a composer and conductor in Milan was secure, but the death of his parents in the meantime forced him to return to Fiume.

Back home, he accepted the post of conductor and concert master of the Town Theatre Orchestra, taught stringed instruments at the Philharmonic Institute, and simultaneously wrote numerous compositions with his characteristic speed and ease. In 1860, his opera Amelia ossia Il Bandito was met with great success, though two years later, after a prolonged illness, Zajc chose to move to Vienna, where opera and theatre were flourishing. His eight-year stay there (1862–70) was marked by further success, though he settled for composing operettas rather than operas. His first Viennese work, Mannschaft an Bord (1863), was enormously well received and his later operettas only served to strengthen his growing reputation. Yet it was in Vienna that Zajc became involved with the Croatian academic society Velebit and frequently met with young Croatian students. Influenced by such Croatian cultural figures as bishop Josip Juraj Strossmayer and poets Petar Preradović, Ivan Trnski, August Šenoa, and Matija Divković, Zajc chose patriotism over world fame and returned to Kingdom of Croatia-Slavonia.

=== Return to Croatia ===
Upon his arrival in Zagreb in 1870, Zajc was presented with two posts: director and conductor of the Croatian Opera and director and teacher at the Croatian Institute of Music. It was during this period that Zajc made his major contribution to Croatian musical culture, not only through his compositions, but also through his leadership in reorganizing Zagreb's musical institutions. He was also an excellent vocal teacher and succeeded in training several prominent singers. Zajc was an exceptionally prolific composer, as evidenced by almost 1000 works, from Op. 234 to Op. 1202, produced during his time in Zagreb. Included in this number are Mislav (1870), Ban Leget (1872), his masterpiece Nikola Šubić Zrinski (1876), and Lizinka (1878), in addition to operettas, musical comedies, cantatas, songs and choral compositions, concerti, chamber music, and many other works.

Zajc's appointment at the opera was maintained until 1889, when owing to financial difficulties the organization lapsed for a time, but Zajc retained his post at the school until 1908, when he finally retired. He is credited with reviving Croatian music during a period of musical stagnation after the collapse of the Illyrian Movement and raising it to the artistic level where it stands today. His efforts paved the way for new Croatian musical achievements in the early 20th century, which Zajc himself lived to see up to his death on December 16, 1914 in Zagreb.

== List of major works ==
- La tirolese, Premiered in Milan on May 4, 1855
- Amelia ossia Il bandito, Fiume, April 24, 1860
- Mannschaft an Bord, Vienna, December 15, 1863
- Fitzliputzli, Vienna, November 5, 1864
- Die lazzaroni vom Stanzel, Vienna, May 4, 1865
- Die Hexe von Boissy, Vienna, April 24, 1866
- Nachtschwärmer, Vienna, November 10, 1866
- Das Rendezvous in der Schweiz, Vienna, April 3, 1867
- Das Gaugericht, Vienna, September 14, 1867
- Nach Mekka, Vienna, January 11, 1868
- Somnambula, Vienna, January 21, 1868
- Schützen von einst und jetzt, Vienna, July 25, 1868
- Meister Puff, Vienna, May 22, 1869
- Mislav, Zagreb, February 2, 1870
- Symphony in C minor (also known as Symphonic Poem), Op. 394 (1870)
- Ban Leget, Zagreb, July 16, 1872
- Der gefangene Amor, Vienna, September 12, 1874
- Nikola Šubić Zrinski, Zagreb, November 4, 1876
- Lizinka, Zagreb, November 12, 1878
- Der Wildling, Zagreb, September 23, 1905
- Prvi grijeh, Zagreb, April 25, 1907; December 18, 1912
- Oče naš, Zagreb, December 16, 1911

== Sources ==
- Josip Andreis: Ivan Zajc, Encyclopedia of Music, No. 3, Miroslav Krleža Institute of Lexicography, Zagreb. Translated to English by Tomislav Pisk for the Nikola Šubić Zrinski libretto book published by Croatia Records.
- Ivan pl. Zajc Biography
- Stanford OperaGlass
- Hubert Pettan, Popis skladbi Ivana Zajca [List of compositions by Ivan Zajc]. Zagreb: Yugoslav Academy of Sciences and Arts, 1956.
- Zdravko Blažeković, Ivan Zajc u ogledalu svoje korespondencije [Ivan Zajc reflected in his correspondence], Arti musices X/1 (1979), 43–77.
- Marija Božić, ur., Tragovima glazbene baštine: Ivan Zajc, u povodu 150. obljetnice rođenja [On the path of music heritage: Ivan Zajc, on the 150th anniversary of his birth], Zagreb: Zagreb: Muzički informativni centar Koncertne direkcije Zagreb, 1982.
- Lovro Županović, ur., Zbornik radova sa znanstvnog skupa održanog u povodu 150. obljetnice rođenja Ivana Zajca [Proceedings of the conference held on the 150th anniversary of Ivan Zajc's birth]. Zagreb, Yugoslav Academy of Sciences and Arts, 1982.
- Hubert Pettan, Hrvatska opera: Ivan Zajc. II [Croatian opera: Ivan Zajc. II. Zagreb: Muzički informativni centar Koncertne direkcije Zagreb, 1983.
- Stanislav Tuksar, ur., Rani Zajc, Rijeka-Milano-Rijeka (1832.-1862.) [Early Zajc, Rijeka-Milan-Rijeka (1982–1862)]. Rijeka: Croatian National Theatre Ivan pl. Zajc, 1998.
- Zdravko Blažeković, Glazba osjenjena politikom: Studije o hrvatskoj glazbi između 17. i 19. stoljeća. Zagreb: Matica hrvatska, 2002.
- Vjera Katalinić/Stanislav Tuksar, ur., Mladi Zajc, Beč = Young Zajc, Vienna, 1862.-1870. Rijeka: Izdavački centar Rijeka, 2003.
