= First Battle of Zrínyiújvár =

Part of the Austro-Turkish War (1663–1664)

Coordinates: 46.324606641859056°N 16.876716784225437°E

First Battle of Novi Zrin/Zrínyiújvár
- Part of the Austro-Turkish War (1663–1664)
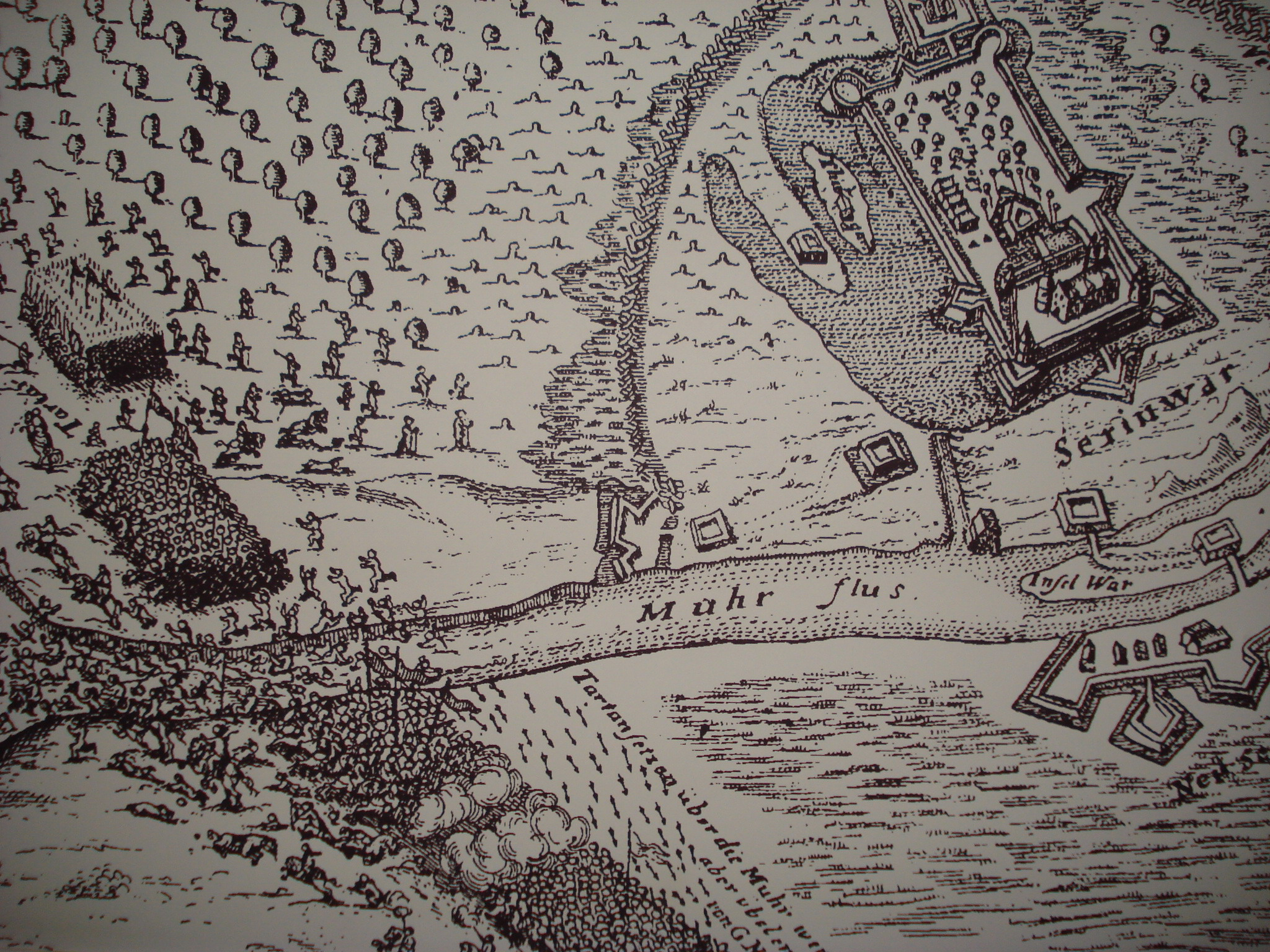
- Probable depiction of the battle.
Date	August 13, 1663
Location	Zrínyiújvár/Novi Zrin, Hungarian-Croatian border on Mura river
Result	Hungarian-Croatian victory

Belligerents
Habsburg Monarchy: Kingdom of Hungary; Kingdom of Croatia	Ottoman Empire

Commanders and leaders
Miklós Zrínyi; Petar Zrinski	Kanije Pasha

Strength
Unknown	7,000

Casualties and losses
Unknown	600

The First Battle of Novi Zrin (Hungarian: Zrínyiújvár) was fought on August 13, 1663, as part of the Austro-Turkish War (1663–1664), between the Kingdom of Hungary and the Kingdom of Croatia between troops commanded of Ban Miklós Zrínyi/Nikola Zrinski and the Ottoman army. The battle took place near Zrínyiújvár/Novi Zrin (Zrínyi/Zrinski's family's fortress) in present-day Croatia and resulted in Hungarian-Croatian victory.

== Context ==
From the beginning of its construction in 1661, Novi Zrin/Zrínyiújvár fortress was a thorn in the eye of both Ottoman forces in the region because it compromised their positions in Kanije Eyalet, as well as Habsburg Imperial authorities. The Habsburgs at a time wanted to remain in the defensive on their eastern borders against the Ottomans. The imperial policies therefore contradicted those of their Croatian and Hungarian vassals who wanted to see more offensive Habsburg engagement on eastern borders against the Ottomans.

== Battle ==
As the Ottoman armies were busy besieging Nové Zámky in modern day Slovakia, N Zrinski/M Zrinyi withdrew to Međimurje to defend Novi Zrin/Zrínyiújvár, where local defenders commander by Petar Zrinski already routed first armies sent by Kanije pasha. Meanwhile, the pasha himself came with his army to Novi Zrin to besiege it. Nikola Zrinski/M Zrinyi in the meantime returned to Novi Zrin/Zrínyiújvár and decided to take his army on a sortie which destroyed the army of Kanije pasha. After that N Zrinski/M Zrinyi's troops continued to pursue the Ottomans back to Kanije/Kaniža, after which they looted the Kanije/Kaniža countryside and returned with the booty back to Novi Zrin/Zrínyiújvár.

== Sources ==
- Ferenc Tóth, Saint Gotthard 1664, une bataille Européenne, Éditions Lavauzelle, 2007. ISBN 978-2-7025-1064-3
- Sándor Szilágyi, A Magyar Nemzet Története IV. fejezet
