= Siege of Nitra (1664) =

- Part of Austro-Turkish War (1663–1664)
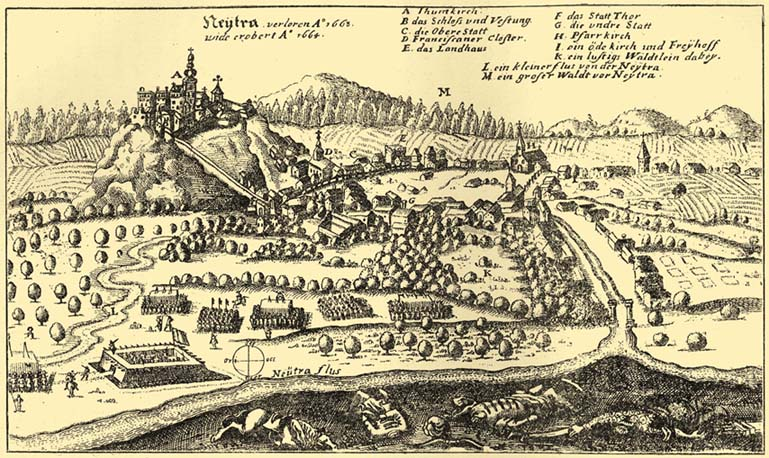
- The siege of Nitra on a copper engraving
Date	17 April – 3 May 1664
Location	Nitra, Kingdom of Hungary
Result	Habsburg–Hungarian–Polish victory

Belligerents
Ottoman Empire	Habsburg Monarchy; Kingdom of Hungary; Polish–Lithuanian Commonwealth

Commanders and leaders
Ghazi Hussein Pasha	Jean-Louis Raduit de Souches; István Koháry

Strength
1,000	14,000–16,000; 12,000–13,000 Austrians; 2,000–3,000 Hungarians

Casualties and losses
400	Unknown

The siege of Nitra in 1664 lasted from 17 April to 3 May. The castle was defended by the Ottomans against Austrian and Hungarian troops led by Jean-Louis Raduit de Souches.

== Background ==
Nitra was occupied on October 12 by an Ottoman army led by Ghazi Hussein. The defenders of the castle capitulated to the Pasha after a short fight, so he took the stronghold without much resistance. The official of the bishopric of Nitra and the castle was János Terjek of Szenterzsébet, former tax collector of Zala County.

In the winter of the following year, Jean-Louis Raduit de Souches, with the help of Hungarian and Polish troops, carried out operations in the Highlands, which partly served a diversionary purpose, while the Croatian Ban Miklós Zrínyi led the main forces along the Drava.

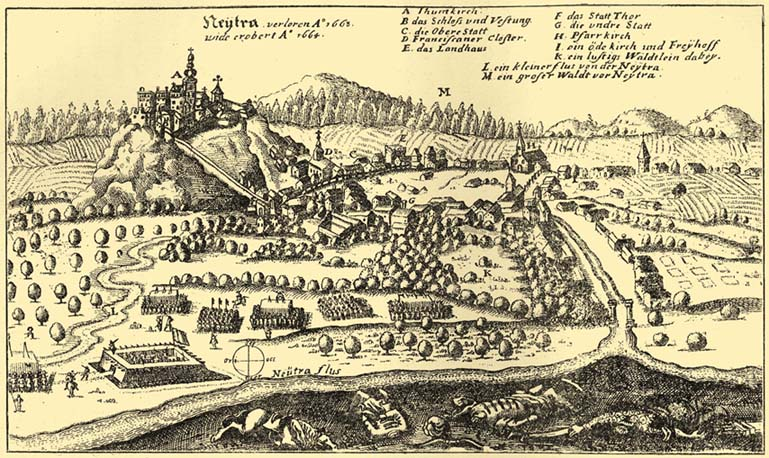
Siege of Nitra

== Siege of Nitra ==
To retake Nitra, an army of 16,000 men marched under Jean-Louis Raduit de Souches and István Koháry, of which about 2,000 to 3,000 soldiers were Hungarians. Nitra was defended by 1,000 Turks under Ghazi Hussein.

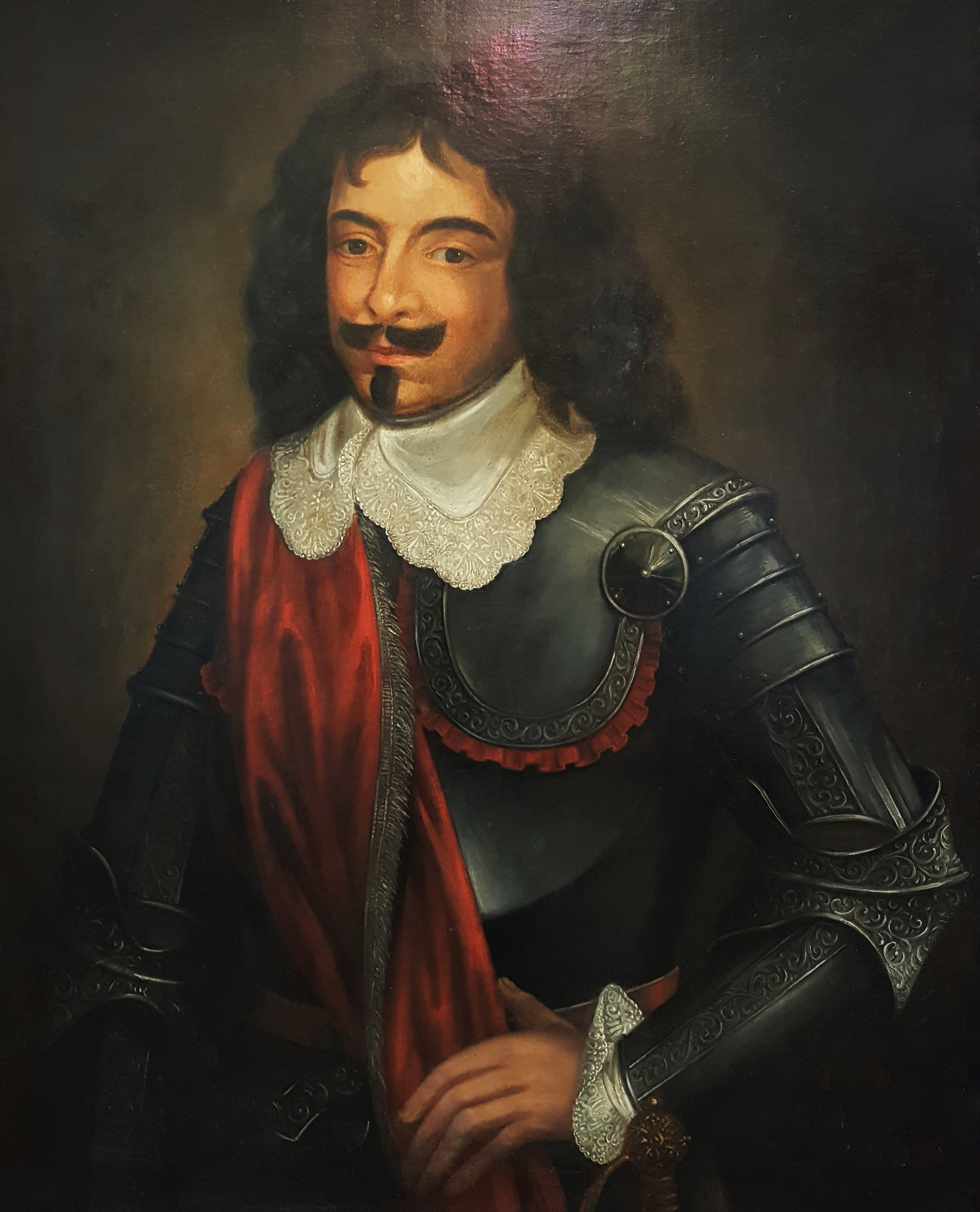
Jean-Louis Raduit de Souches

The first assault was fended off by the Turkish defenders of the castle, and de Souches switched to continuous shelling of the castle, which greatly disturbed the Turks, the Upper and Lower Towns were burned. The shelling of the castle lasted another three days, and part of its walls completely collapsed, but the Turks did not surrender.

Kurd Mehmed Pasha, who was in the castle, broke out with 300 horsemen, but most of his soldiers were lost in the fight.

De Souches received reinforcements, and the defenders began to negotiate surrender. The commanders agreed on the terms of a free retreat, and on April 18 the remaining Turkish army of 400 horsemen and 200 infantry, left Nitra.

== Aftermath ==
In the castle, de Souches left 800 soldiers and a few hundred horsemen.

De Souches planned to restore the destroyed walls. Paris von Spankau, whom he made captain of the castle, advised the strategic demolition of the Lower Town to obtain building material for the restoration work. At the request of Palatine Ferenc Wesselényi, Jean-Louis Raduit de Souches abandoned this plan.

Nitra remained in the Royal Hungary even after the Treaty of Vasvár. The bishop of the city, Miklós Pálffy, started fortifying the castle in 1669, because he was afraid that it would be attacked by the Ottomans again.

== See also ==
- Jean-Louis Raduit de Souches
- Austro-Turkish War (1663-1664)
