= Siege of Novi Zrin (1664) =

Battle in 1664

- Part of the Croatian–Ottoman wars and Ottoman–Habsburg wars
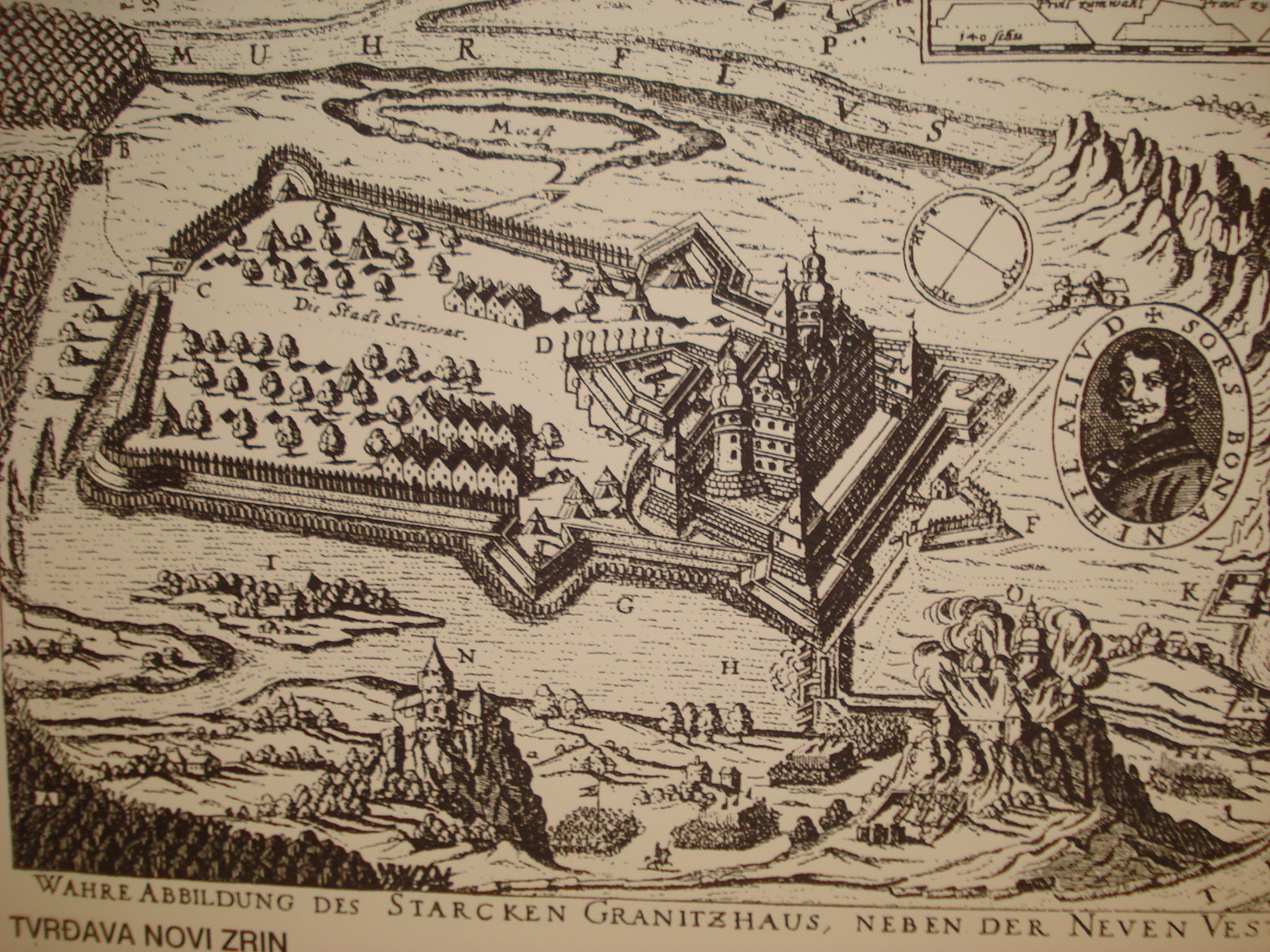
- Novi Zrin Castle, situated on the right bank of the Mura River (Muhr flus), in 1664, before it was destroyed.
Date	5 June – 7 July 1664
Location	Novi Zrin Castle (Új-Zrínyivár), Međimurje County, northern Croatia (at the border to Hungary) 46.3326°N 16.87829°E
Result	Ottoman victory

Belligerents
Habsburg Monarchy: Kingdom of Croatia; Kingdom of Hungary; League of the Rhine	Ottoman Empire: Crimean Khanate (Ottoman protectorate)

Commanders and leaders
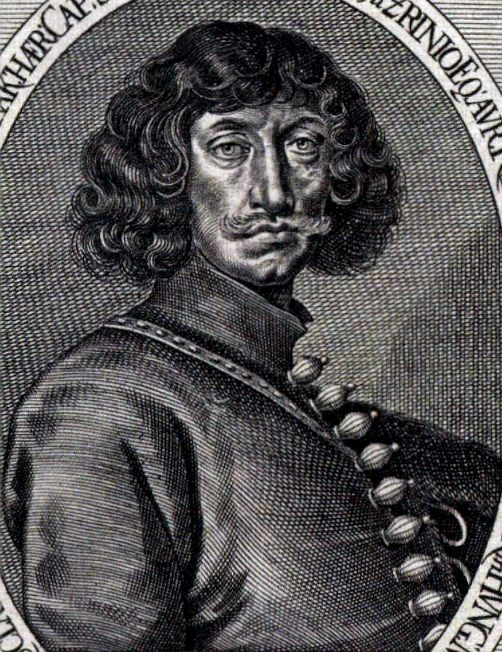
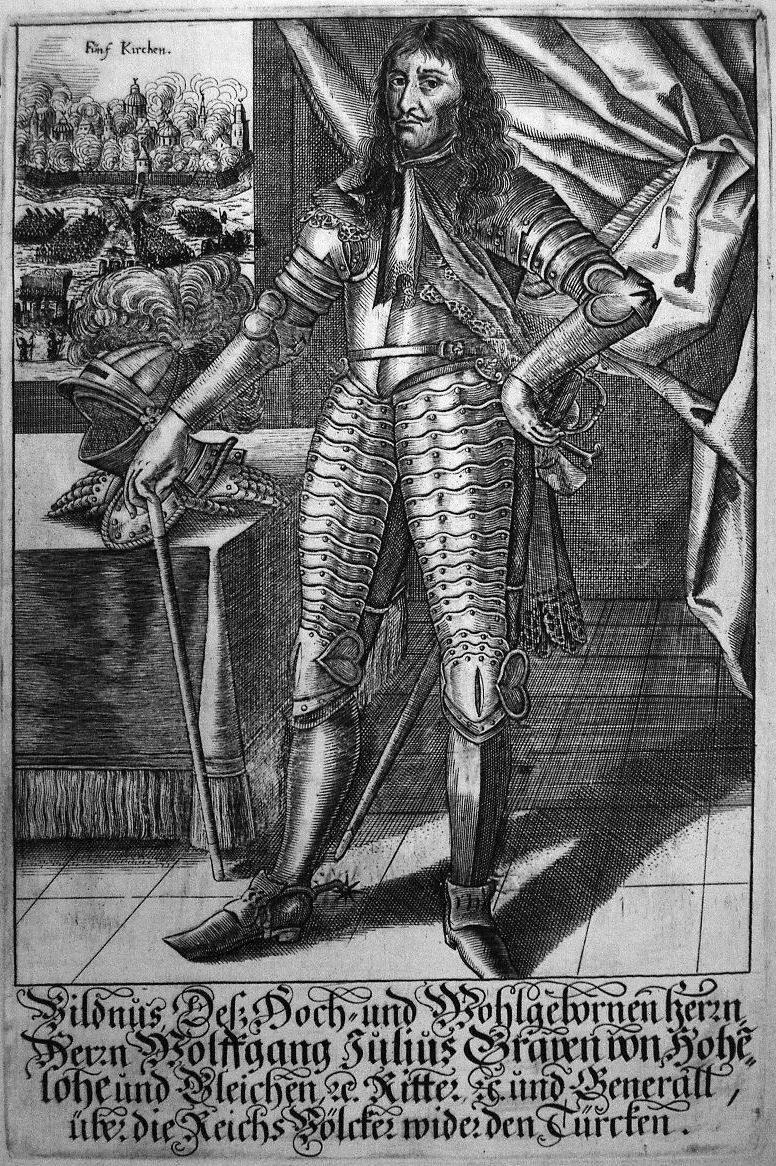
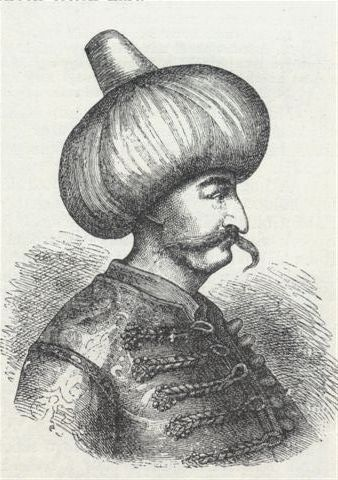
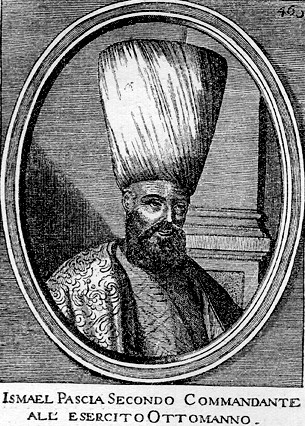
Nikola Zrinski, Ban (viceroy) of Croatia General Wolfgang Julius, Count of Hohenlohe-Neuenstein; General Peter count of Strozzi †	(Ottoman Empire) Köprülü Fazıl Ahmed Pasha, Grand Vizier (Ottoman Empire) Ismail Pasha Bosniak; Evliya Çelebi

Strength
~ 3,000 Croatian and other (mostly German (~1,200) and Hungarian (~700)) defenders (not far in the open fields around 27,000-30,000 men encamped awaited the outcome of the battle)	70,000 – 100,000 Ottomans and Tatars

Casualties and losses
~ Unknown	~ Unknown

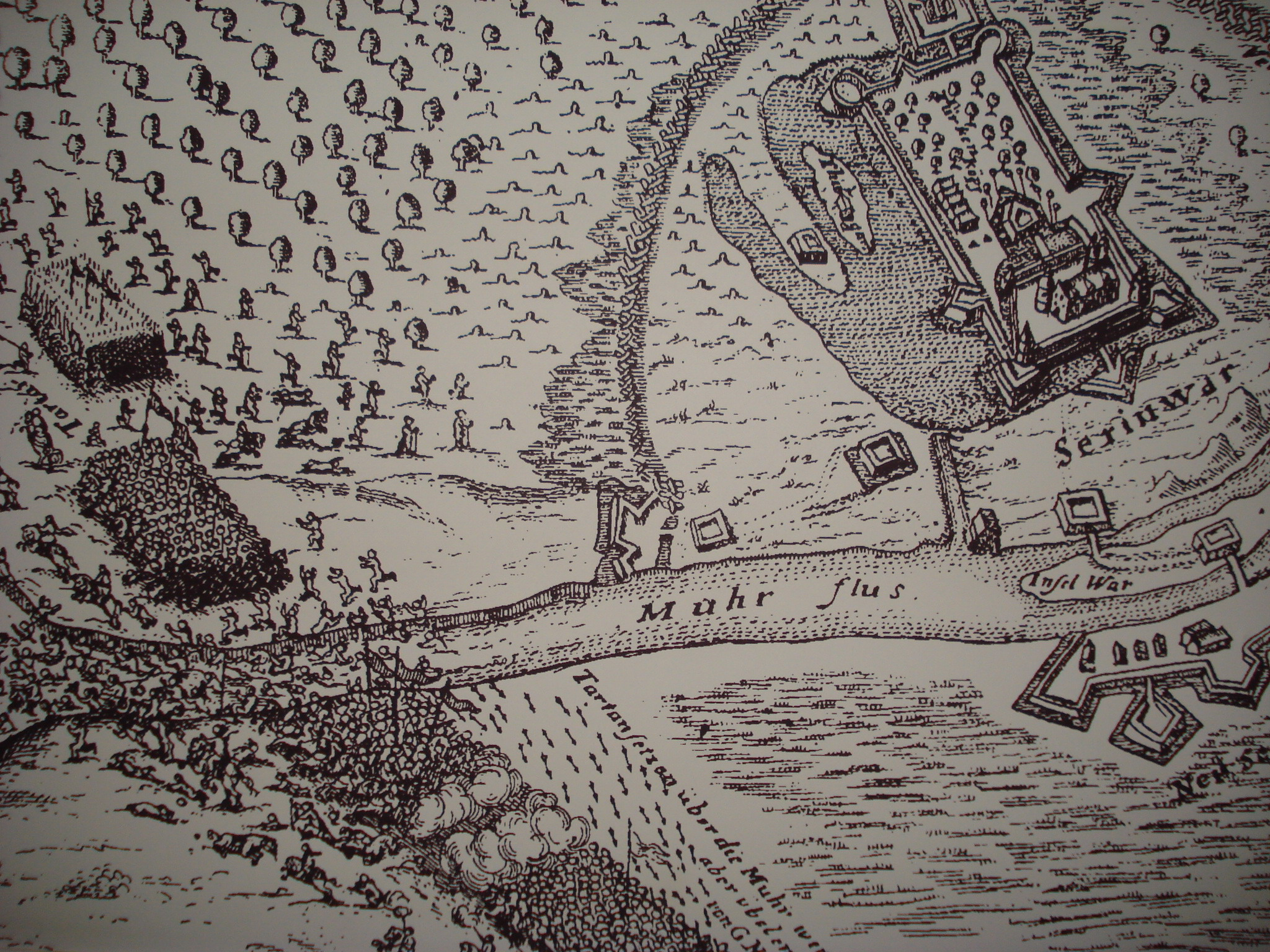
Depiction of Battle of Novi Zrin in 1663, when Croatian defenders successfully defended the fort.

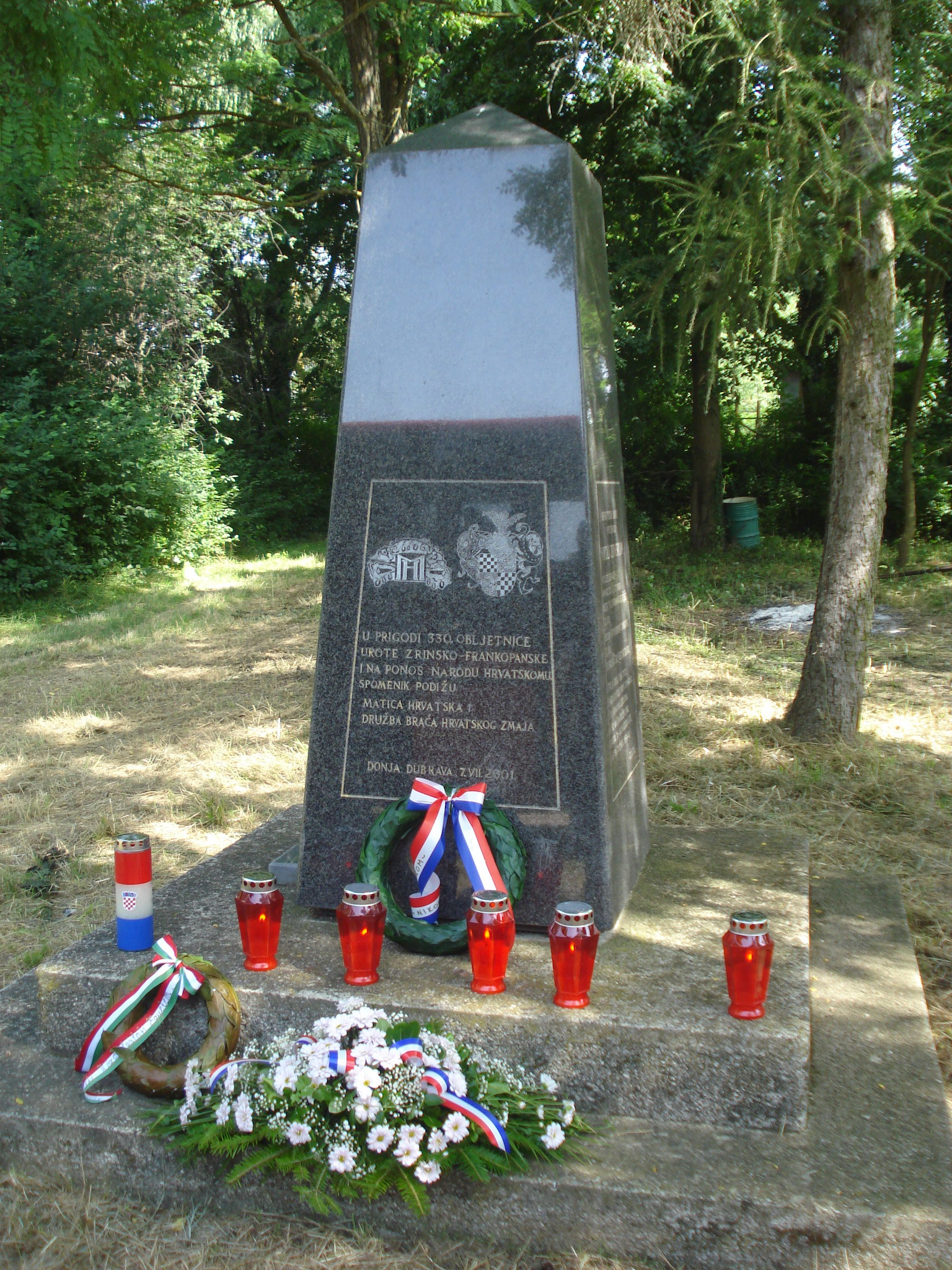
Memorial obelisk on the place where the castle once was

The siege of Novi Zrin (New Zrin Castle); Croatian: Utvrda Novi Zrin; Hungarian: Új-Zrínyivár; Turkish: Zerinvar) in June/July 1664 was last of the military conflicts between the Croatian forces (with allies) led by Nikola Zrinski, Ban (viceroy) of Croatia, and the Ottoman army commanded by Köprülü Fazıl Ahmed Pasha, Grand Vizier, dealing with possession of Novi Zrin Castle, defended by Croats, situated on the bank and marshy islands of Mura River, near the border line between northern Croatia and southwestern part of Hungary, at the time occupied by the Ottomans. The battle resulted in destruction of the castle, and retreat of the Croatian crew, which was forced to withdraw to safer territory of inland Croatia.

== Historical background ==
Despite local skirmishes and battles along the Ottoman border with Croatia, Hungary and Transylvania at the beginning of the 1660s, there was a period of unstable and insecure (tacit assumption) temporary peace between the Habsburg monarchy and the Ottoman Empire. It seemed that both sides wanted to keep it; however, Leopold I of Habsburg, twenty-year-old inexperienced Emperor, under strong influence of his advisors, feared Ottoman campaign towards Vienna and possible siege of the Austrian capital, so he kept the majority of his military forces close to Vienna.

At the same time, Nikola Zrinski, Croatian ban and brave and skillful warrior, well-known all over Europe, demanded support from the Viennese court to consolidate and reinforce the border line in northern Croatia, by constructing new fortifications that would parry and neutralize the Ottoman threat from Kanije Eyalet in the occupied southwestern Hungary, but with no success. In 1661 Zrinski started construction of new stronghold - Novi Zrin Castle, on his own, at the confluence of the Mura River with the Drava, finishing it during 1662. Since then, the castle was attacked several times by the Ottomans, especially in 1663, but its defence was solid and successful.

== Siege ==
At the beginning of June 1664 a large Ottoman army, numbering up to 100,000 men (some sources mention even much more), including around 40,000 Ottoman and 30,000 Tatar fighters, led personally by the Grand Vizier Köprülü, was moving from Constantinople to the northwest and approaching Novi Zrin (later to fight in the Battle of Saint Gotthard on 1 August 1664). The defenders of Novi Zrin consisted mostly of Croatian and German soldiers (around 3,000 men in total), while the majority of the Habsburg army (30,000 men) under command of Raimondo Montecuccoli, encamped not far from the battle field, awaited the outcome of the battle.

On 5 June 1664 Köprülü ordered siege and continuous attacks upon the castle. After a few weeks of fighting, with exhausted defenders receiving only insignificant reinforcements from the Emperor's headquarters, the Turks managed to dig lagums, or tunnels, below the bastions and ignited gunpowder to blow them up. On 7 July 1664 the strong explosions destroyed parts of the walls, making big holes. Aggressors consequently rushed and penetrated into the castle.

As the siege of Novi Zrin was ongoing, Crimean Tatars led by kahn's son Ahmed Giray raided the Croatian countryside, which according to Evliya Celeby's Seyahatnâme resulted in sack of Krapina.

The surviving and enormously outnumbered Croatian defenders were forced to withdraw from the castle and abandon the Mura River area. Ottoman commanders gave the order to their soldiers to destroy Novi Zrin completely to the ground and then marched their army northwards, first towards Kanije and then towards Saint Gotthard.

== Aftermath ==
The destruction of Novi Zrin, together with a little bit later (on 10 August 1664) signed the Peace of Vasvár, that was recognized by many Croatian and Hungarian magnates like Zrinski as unfavourable and shameful. Their tension with the Habsburg government lead to the Zrinski–Frankopan conspiracy. Later in the same year Zrinski died, allegedly killed by a wild boar, but the rest of magnates continued the conspiracy, which ended tragically in 1671.

Novi Zrin was never rebuilt. Today there is only a memorial obelisk on the place where the castle once was.

== See also ==
- Croatian–Ottoman Wars
- Austro-Turkish War (1663–64)
- Ottoman–Habsburg wars
- Ottoman wars in Europe

== Sources ==
- Feletar, Dragutin (September 2011). "Legradska kapetanija u obrani od Osmanlija s posebnim osvrtom na Novi Zrin" [Role of the Legrad Military District in the Defence against the Ottoman Empire - Special Emphasis on Novi Zrin]. Rad Hrvatske Akademije Znanosti i Umjetnosti (in Croatian) (510=48). Zagreb: The Croatian Academy of Sciences and Arts: 47–81. ISSN 1330-0768. 48=510(2011):47-81.
