= Second Battle of Zrínyiújvár =

Battle in Europe

Coordinates: 46.324606641859056°N 16.876716784225437°E

- Part of the Austro-Turkish War (1663–1664)
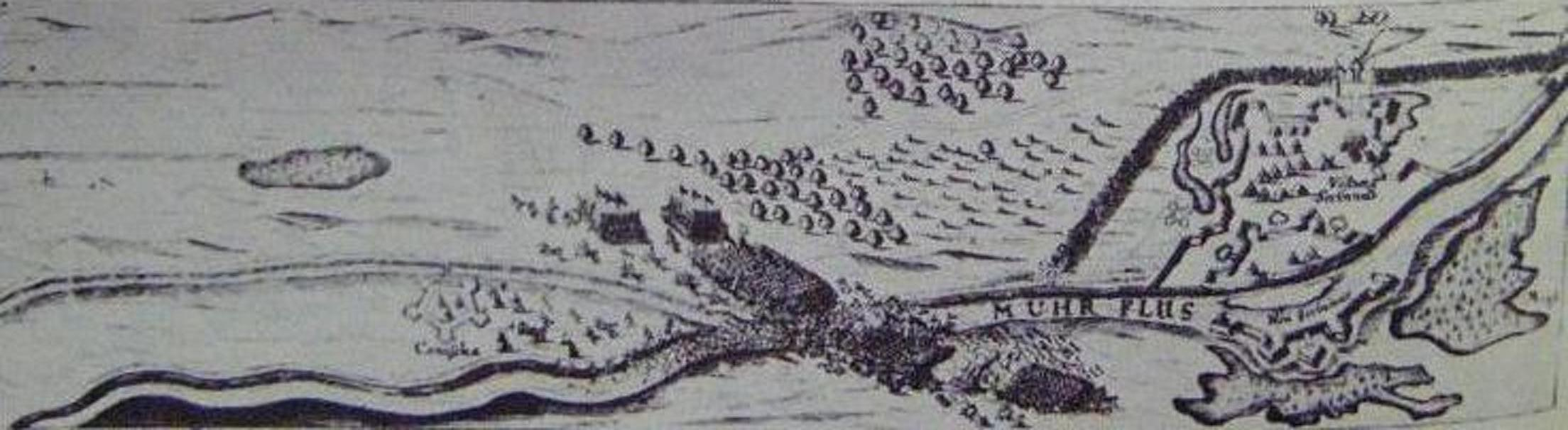
Date	November 27, 1663
Location	Zrínyiújvár/Novi Zrin, Hungarian-Croatian border
Result	Hungarian–Croatian victory

Belligerents
Habsburg Monarchy: Kingdom of Hungary; Kingdom of Croatia	Ottoman Empire

Commanders and leaders
Miklós Zrínyi; Péter Zrínyi	(Ottoman Empire) Ali Pasha †

Strength
Unknown	16,000

The Second Battle of Zrínyiújvár (Croatian: Novi Zrin) was fought on November 27, 1663, as part of the Austro-Turkish War (1663–1664), between the Kingdom of Hungary and the Kingdom of Croatia under the command of Ban Miklós Zrínyi and an Ottoman army. The battle took place near Zrínyiújvár (Zrínyi family's fortress) in present-day Croatia and was a Hungarian-Croatian victory.

== Sources ==
- Ferenc Tóth, Saint Gotthard 1664, une bataille Européenne, Éditions Lavauzelle, 2007. ISBN 978-2-7025-1064-3
- Sándor Szilágyi, A Magyar Nemzet Története IV. fejezet
