= Siege of Érsekújvár (1663) =

Battle of the Austro-Turkish War

- Part of the Austro-Turkish War (1663–1664)
- Engraving of the Siege of Ersekujvar (1631)
Date	August – 13 September 1663
Location	Érsekújvár, Kingdom of Hungary (today: Nové Zámky, Slovakia) 47°59′N 18°10′E
Result	Ottoman victory
Territorial changes	The Ottomans capture Érsekújvár

Belligerents
Holy Roman Empire: Habsburg Monarchy; Kingdom of Hungary	Ottoman Empire

Commanders and leaders
Ádám Forgách	Fazil Ahmed Pasha

The Siege of Érsekújvár, also known as the Siege of Uyvar or the Siege of Neuhäusel, occurred in 1663 when Grand Vizier Fazil Ahmed Pasha, who led the Ottomans, invaded Habsburg Hungary and captured the Hungarian fortress at Érsekújvár (Hungarian: Érsekújvár, German: Neuhäus[e]l, Latin: Novum Castrum, Turkish: Uyvar, modern Nové Zámky in southern Slovakia).

== Background ==
In the first half of the 17th century, a stalemate was reached between the Ottoman Empire and Austrian monarchy. After many peaceful years, however, border clashes began. John Kemény, the Habsburg candidate to the throne of Transylvania, was trying to defeat the Ottoman vassal Michael I Apafi. Although Apafi won the throne with Ottoman support, the Austrians captured the forts of Kolozsvár (now Cluj-Napoca, Romania) and Székelyhíd (now Săcueni, Romania). They also built the fort of Zrínyiújvár (Croatian Novi Zrin) facing the Ottoman fort of Kanije (now Nagykanizsa in Hungary). Meanwhile, the Ottoman Army was marching to Dalmatia in the scope of Cretan War (1645-1669) against Venice. Ottoman Sultan Mehmet IV gave the priority to the Austrian front, and the army changed its course.

== Peace talks ==
The commander of the Ottoman army was Grand Vizier Fazıl Ahmet Pasha (a member of Köprülü family). While he was marching to the Austrian front, the Austrians appealed for peace. There were a series of three peace negotiations; the first in Belgrad (now the capital of Serbia); the second in Eszék (modern Osijek in Croatia); and the third in Budapest (now the capital of Hungary). The Turks sought reparations of 200,000 florins and the withdrawal of the Austrian army. Ultimately the Habsburgs rejected the Turkish terms and the peace talks ended.

== Siege ==
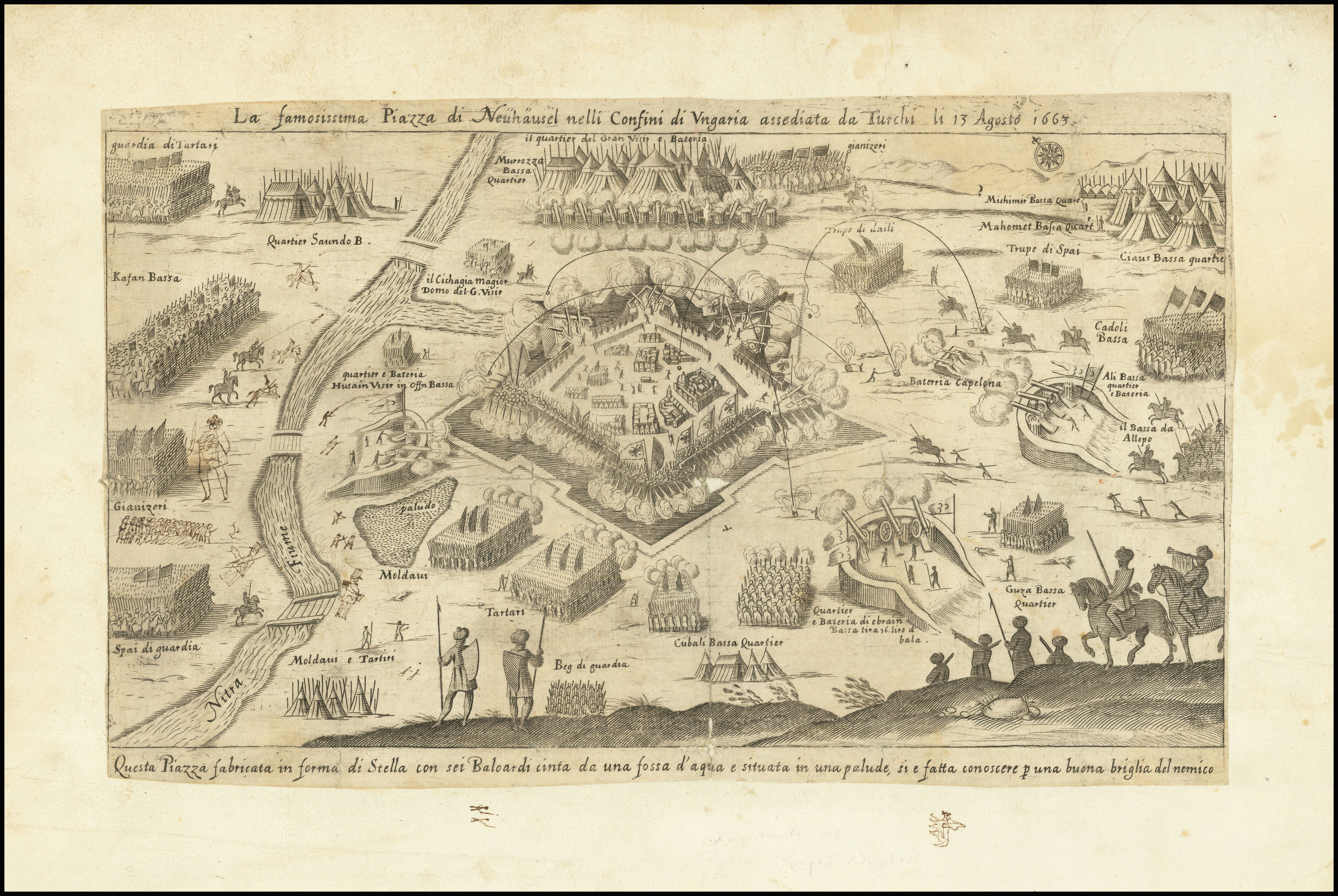
Siege of Érsekújvár in 1663

Fazıl Ahmet Pasha decided to march to Érsekújvár a major fort in Northern Hungary (now in Slovakia). It was fortified, and in the 16th century, the Ottomans had tried several times to capture it. The popular saying "'Strong (insistent) as a Turk in front of Nové Zámky" reflects the memory of the Ottomans' determination to conquer it. Before the army reached Érsekújvár on August 7, the commander of Érsekújvár, Ádám Forgách, tried to raid the Ottoman camp. However, the attempt was disastrous for the Austrians. The siege began in August, and the fort was captured on 13 September. According to the surrender treaty, the residents of Érsekújvár were given free passage to Austria, and a letter was written to the Austrian government to certify that the fort had been defended bravely.

== Aftermath ==
Fazil Ahmed Pasha went on to capture Nógrád, in northern Hungary. Uyvar and the neighbouring area was declared a seat of the beylerbey, as the Uyvar Eyalet (Turkish: Uyvar Beylerbeyliği) of the Ottoman Empire. Subsequent clashes in 1663 and 1664 resulted in the Peace of Vasvár.

After the conquest of Érsekújvár, the Ottoman Empire and the Tatars crossed the Váh River and invaded Moravia. The invasion devastated the east and the south of Moravia and the west of Upper Hungary.

== Sources ==
- Bilge, Sadık Müfit (2016-03-06). "Macaristan'da Osmanlı Adli ve İdari Teşkilatının Kuruluşu ve Gelişimi" [The Foundation and Development of the Ottoman Judiciary and Administrative Organization in Hungary] (in Turkish). Archived from the original on 2016-03-06.
- Dupuy, R. Ernest; Dupuy, Trevor N. (1993). The Harper Encyclopedia of Military History: From 3500 BC to the Present. New York: HarperCollins Publishers. ISBN 0-06-270056-1.
- Jorga, Nicolae (2009). Geschichte des Osmanischen [History of the Ottoman Empire] (in German). Istanbul: Reiches IV. ISBN 978-975-6480-17-5.
- Kohn, George Childs (1999). Dictionary of Wars (Revised ed.). New York: Facts On File, Inc.
- Yüce, Dr. Yaşar; Sevim, Dr. Ali (1991). Türkiye tarihi Cilt III [History of Turkey Volume III] (in Turkish). AKDTYKTTK Publications.
