= Battle of Nagyvárad (1664) =

Ottoman battle against Germans and Hungarians

- Part of Austro-Turkish War (1663–1664)
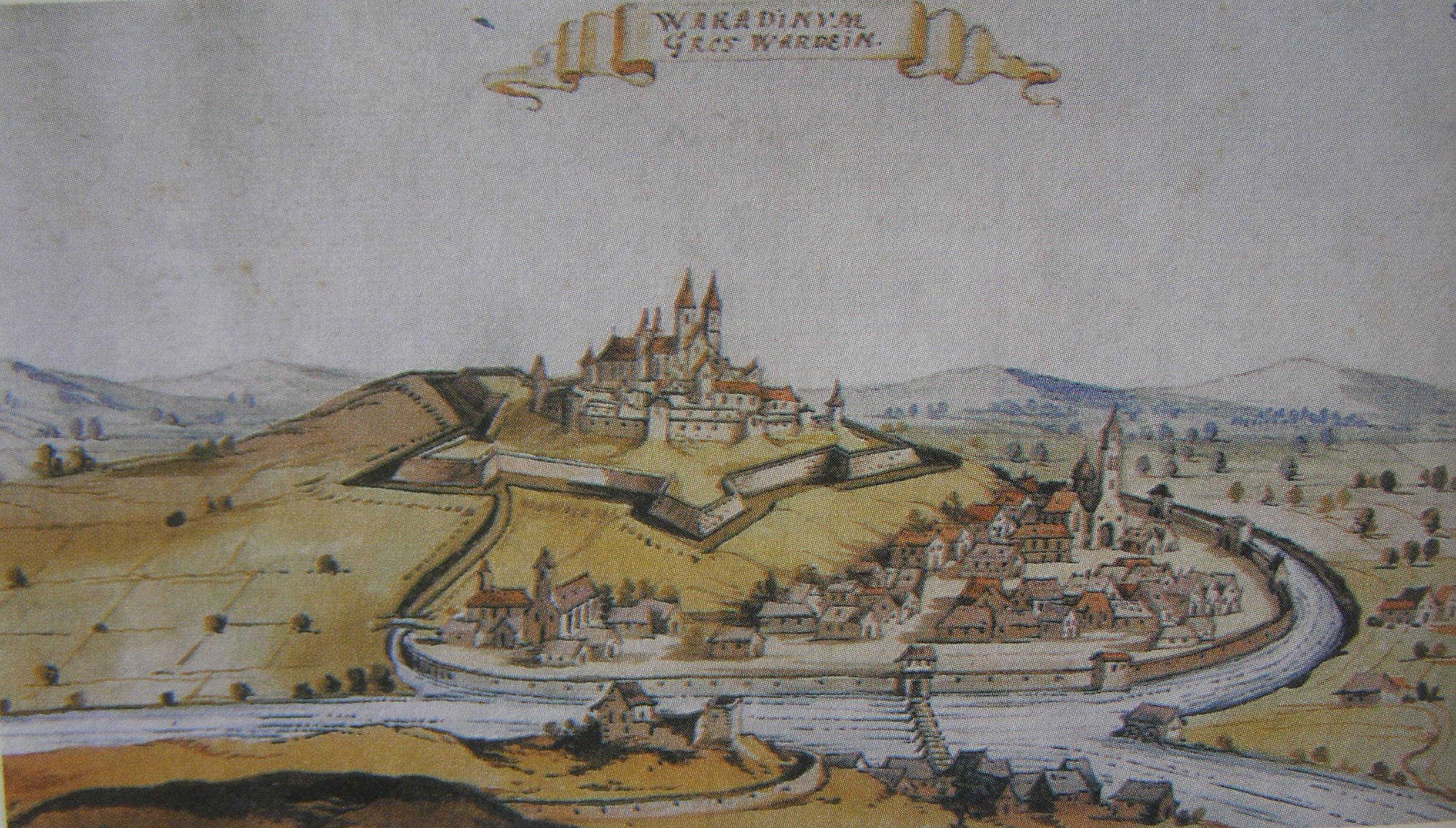
- Nagyvarad in 1664
Date	27 May 1664
Location	Oradea
Result	Ottoman victory

Belligerents
Kingdom of Hungary; Holy Roman Empire	Ottoman Empire

Commanders and leaders
László Rákóczy †; Zsigmond Pethő	Unknown

Strength
2,300 men (2,000 Hungarians and 300 Germans)	Unknown

Casualties and losses
Heavy	Heavy

The battle of Nagyvárad in 1664 occurred when an army of Hungarians and Germans led by László Rákóczy attacked Nagyvárad in order to capture it; however, despite gaining entry, they were later repelled from the city by the Ottoman garrison.

== Background ==
Since the capture of Nagyvárad in 1660 by the Ottomans, the Hungarian lords have made plans to retrieve the lost fortress; however, they do not want to risk a war with the Ottomans. Their chance to attack the castle happened during the ongoing Austro-Turkish war. The Hungarians planned a raid led by László Rákóczy and Zsigmond Pethő and recruited some German and Hungarian troops from nearby outposts. The plan was to attack the city once the governor of Várad, Kucuk Pasha, left the castle by order of the Grand Vizier, which exactly happened.

== Battle ==
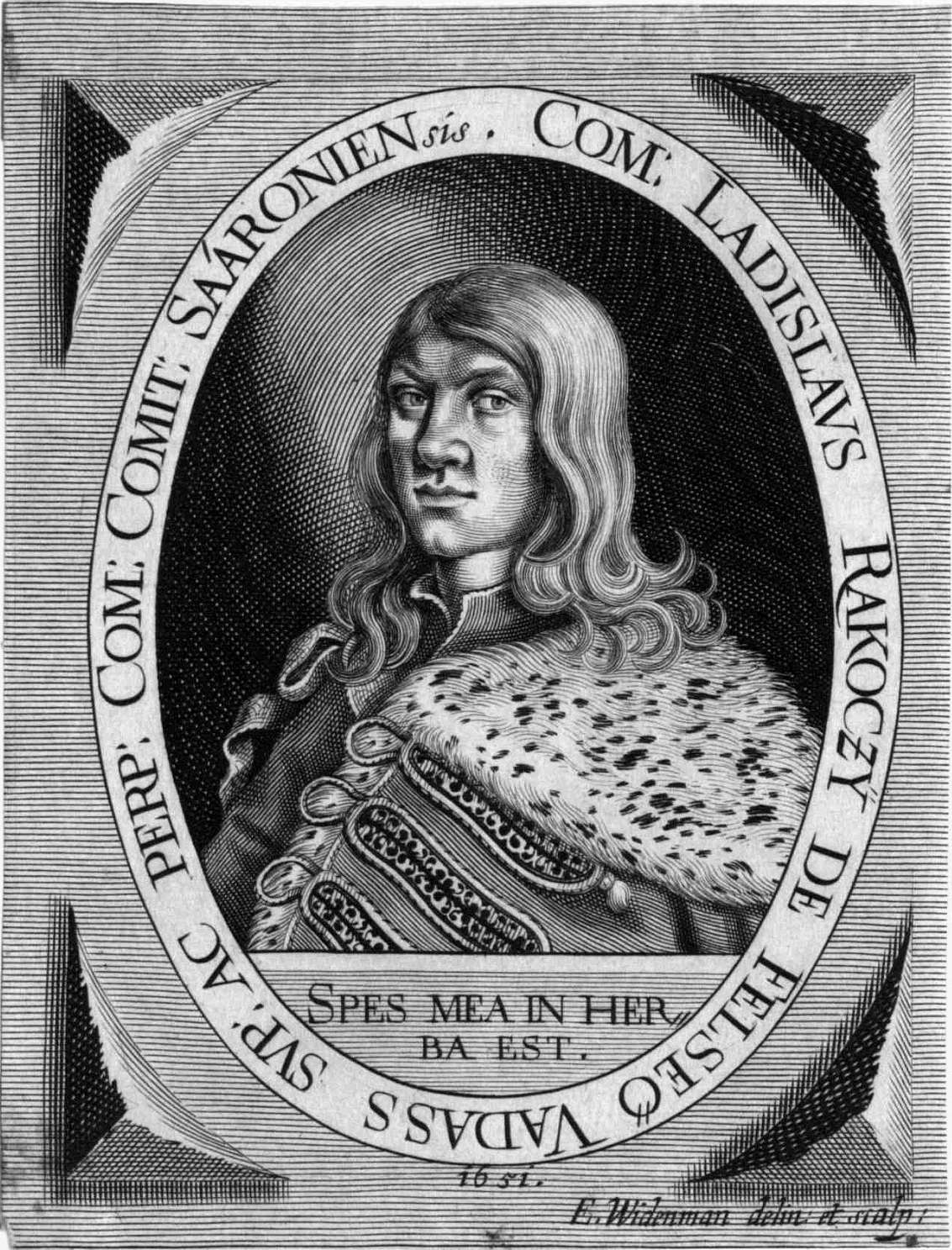
László Rákóczi

A Hungarian force of 2,000 and a German force of 300 arrived in the town on May 27. Different accounts give different details of the battle. One account states that Rákóczy and 200 men entered the city in peasant clothing during a fair during which Turks, Hungarian merchants, and peasants flocked together. Due to unknown reasons, either by betrayal or aroused suspicion, the Turks took up arms and attacked the infiltrators. The battle has begun. Rákóczy and his men threw themselves on the Turks and tried to enter the castle; however, Rákóczy was killed, and only a few managed to escape while the rest were killed or captured. A second account states that Rákóczy attacked the castle; however, he was met with resistance and killed. Furious, the Hungarians set Varad on fire and freed many captives. However, these accounts are unlikely.

A third account seems more plausible. The Hungarian and German troops managed to enter the town secretly and began looting and sacking the city, forgetting about their main objective, which was to capture the city. The Ottoman garrison used this and gathered their forces. A fierce battle ensued, and the Hungarian German force was ousted from the city. Both sides sustained heavy losses. Rákóczy was killed during the battle. Despite this, the retreating Hungarians acquired a large amount of loot during the sack.

== Sources ==
- Historical overview (1916), commissioned by the Hungarian Academy of Sciences (in Hungarian).
