= Habsburg (disambiguation) =

Habsburg generally refers to the House of Habsburg, an important and influential European family that held several royal titles.

The House of Habsburg-Lorraine (often shortened to House of Habsburg) succeeded the original House of Habsburg after the latter became extinct in the male line.

Habsburg may also refer to:

- 85199 Habsburg, a main-belt asteroid
- Habsburg Castle, the original seat of the Habsburg family
- Habsburg Hungary, Kingdom of Hungary during the Habsburg rule: (1437-1457), (1526-1867) or (1867-1918)
- Habsburg monarchy, the countries that were ruled by the junior Austrian branch of the House of Habsburg and then by the successor House of Habsburg-Lorraine
- Habsburg Moravia, a Habsburg possession from 1526 until the end of World War I
- Habsburg Netherlands (c. 16th century), the Imperial fiefs in the Low Countries of Belgium, the Netherlands, and Luxembourg
- Habsburg Spain, the rule of Spain in the 16th and 17th centuries by the Habsburg dynasty
- Habsburg, Switzerland, a town in Switzerland
- Habsburg-Valois War (Italian Wars from 1494 to 1559), a general struggle for power and territory among various participants

== Ships ==
- SMS Habsburg (1865), 1865 Austrian ironclad
- SMS Habsburg, 1899 Austro-Hungarian pre-dreadnought battleship
- Habsburg-class battleship, a class of three pre-dreadnought battleships of Austria-Hungary

== See also ==
- Habsburg Hungary (disambiguation)
- Philippine Dynasty
- von Habsburg, surname
