= Von Habsburg =

Von Habsburg is a surname. Notable people with the surname include:

- Francesca von Habsburg (born 1958), Archduchess of Austria
- Gabriela von Habsburg (born 1956), Archduchess of Austria
- Géza von Habsburg (born 1940), Archduke of Austria
- Karl von Habsburg, (born 1961), Austrian politician, current Head of the House of Habsburg-Lorraine and son of Otto von Habsburg
- Otto von Habsburg (1912–2011), Crown Prince of Austria
- Ferdinand Habsburg (racing driver) (born 1997), Austrian race driver.

== See also ==
- von Habsburg-Lothringen
