= Habsburg Hungary =

Habsburg Hungary may refer to:

- Kingdom of Hungary during the rule of the first Habsburg kings (1437–1457): Albrecht of Hungary and Ladislaus the Posthumous
- Habsburg Hungary (1526–1867), Kingdom of Hungary within the Habsburg Monarchy and from 1804 a crownland of the Austrian Empire, under the rule of the Habsburg dynasty
- Habsburg Hungary (1867–1918), Kingdom of Hungary within Austria-Hungary, under the rule of the Habsburg Dynasty

== See also ==
- Habsburg (disambiguation)
- Hungary (disambiguation)
- Habsburg monarchy
- Habsburg Dynasty
