= Austro-Turkish War (1663–1664) =

Series of conflicts (1663–1664) between the Ottoman Empire and the Habsburgs

Austro-Turkish War of 1663–1664
- Part of the Ottoman–Habsburg wars
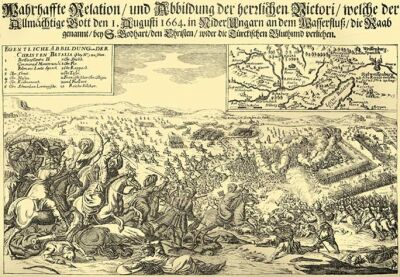
- Battle of Saint Gotthard
Date	12 April 1663 – 10 August 1664
Location	Kingdom of Hungary (present-day Hungary, Slovakia, Croatia)
Result	Peace of Vasvár
Territorial changes	The Ottomans retain Oradea in Transylvania and gain Nové Zámky from the Kingdom of Hungary; Construction of a Habsburg fort along the Waag river, and granted a twenty-year truce.

Belligerents
Habsburg Monarchy; Kingdom of Croatia; Kingdom of Hungary; Holy Roman Empire; Brandenburg-Prussia; Electorate of Saxony; Electorate of Bavaria; Duchy of Styria; Duchy of Carniola; Piedmont-Savoy League of the Rhine: Baden-Baden; Swabia; Kingdom of France	Ottoman Empire: Crimean Khanate

Commanders and leaders
Raimondo Montecuccoli; Nikola Zrinski; Jean de Coligny-Saligny; Jean-Louis Raduit de Souches	Fazıl Ahmed Pasha

Strength
Habsburg Monarchy/Holy Roman Empire: 82,700 (annual average) (Note: 31,700 Imperial, 51,000 Habsburg); France: 6,000	100,000

Casualties and losses
20,000+	8,000–10,000 14,000–22,000
- Thousands of Moravian civilians killed, and at least 40,000 captured and enslaved by the Ottomans

The Sixth Austro-Turkish War, also known as the Austro-Turkish War of 1663–1664, was a short war between the Habsburg monarchy and the Ottoman Empire. The Ottoman aim was to resume the advance in central Europe, conquer Vienna and subdue Austria. The Ottomans managed to capture key strongholds, however, the Habsburg army under Raimondo Montecuccoli succeeded in halting the Ottoman army in the Battle of Saint Gotthard.

== Prelude ==
The cause of this war was the invasion of Poland in 1657 by Prince George Rákóczy II of Transylvania, without the permission of the Porte. Transylvania had after the Battle of Mohács in 1526 recognized Ottoman suzerainty and paid a tribute to the Porte and were given political and religious autonomy in return. On hearing about Rákóczy's unauthorized war, the Ottomans declared war on their vassal. It was not long before Grand Vizier Köprülü Mehmed Pasha (Vizier 1656–1661) defeated Rákóczy and conquered Transylvania. The new Transylvanian prince, János Kemény, fled to Vienna seeking Austrian support.

Emperor Leopold I, not wishing to see Transylvania fall under direct Ottoman control, sent Montecuccoli into Hungary with 10,000 men. Montecuccoli's advance into Transylvania was met with contempt by the local populace and his army was ineffective due to disease and privation.

Meanwhile, in order to liberate Croatia and Hungary, Nikola Zrinski, the Ban of Croatia, had since 1661 been doing his best to start a new Austro-Ottoman conflict by organizing raids into Ottoman territory from his stronghold, Novi Zrin (Hungarian: Zrínyiújvár). These raids and the presence of Montecuccoli's army made the Ottomans end the status-quo with Vienna, which had existed between them since 1606.

== 1663 campaign ==
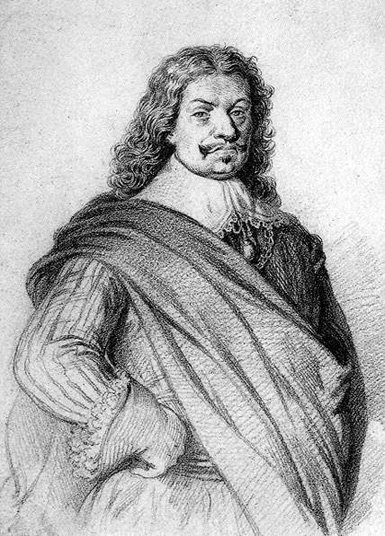
Count Raimondo Montecuccoli

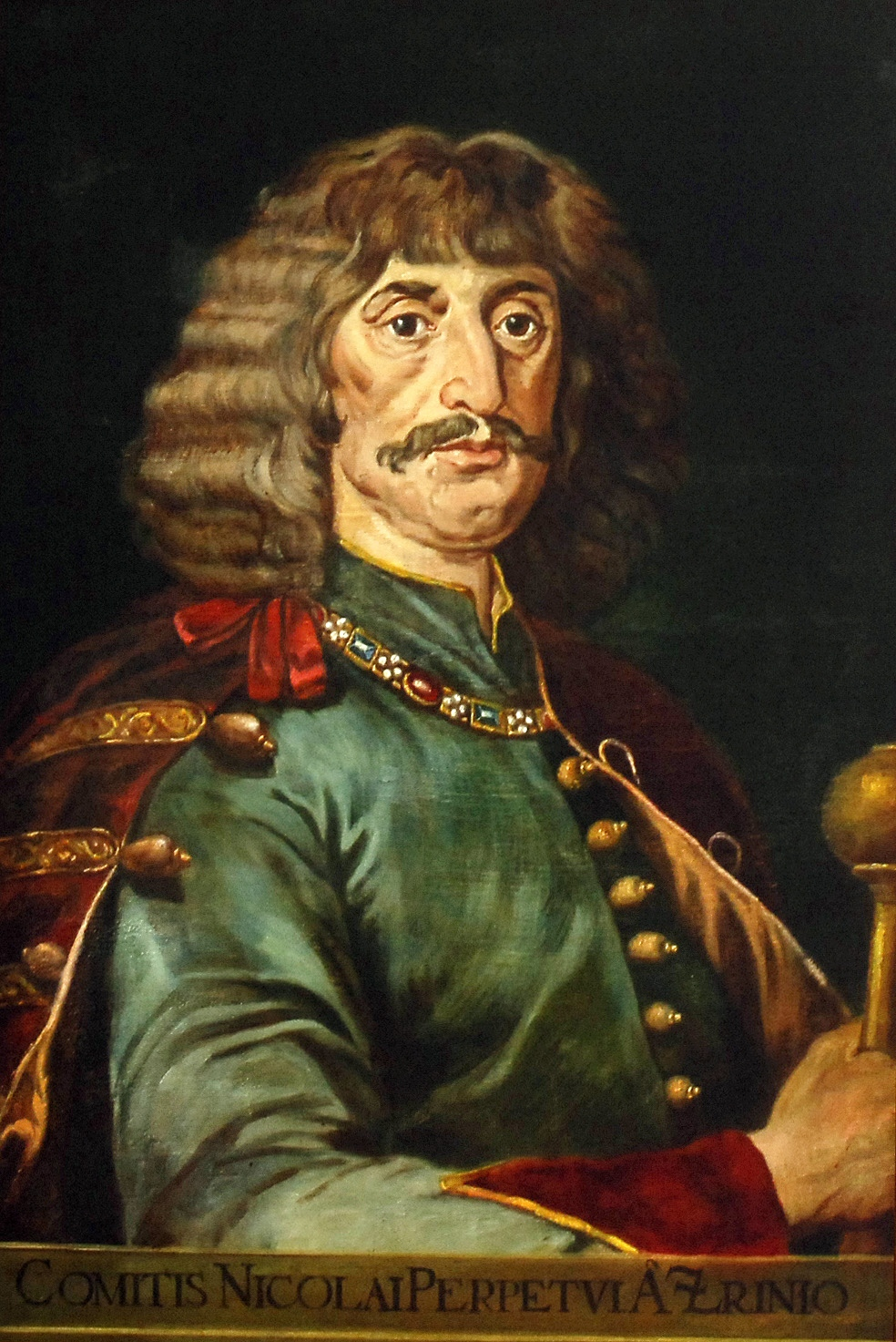
Count Nikola Zrinski, Ban (Viceroy) of Croatia

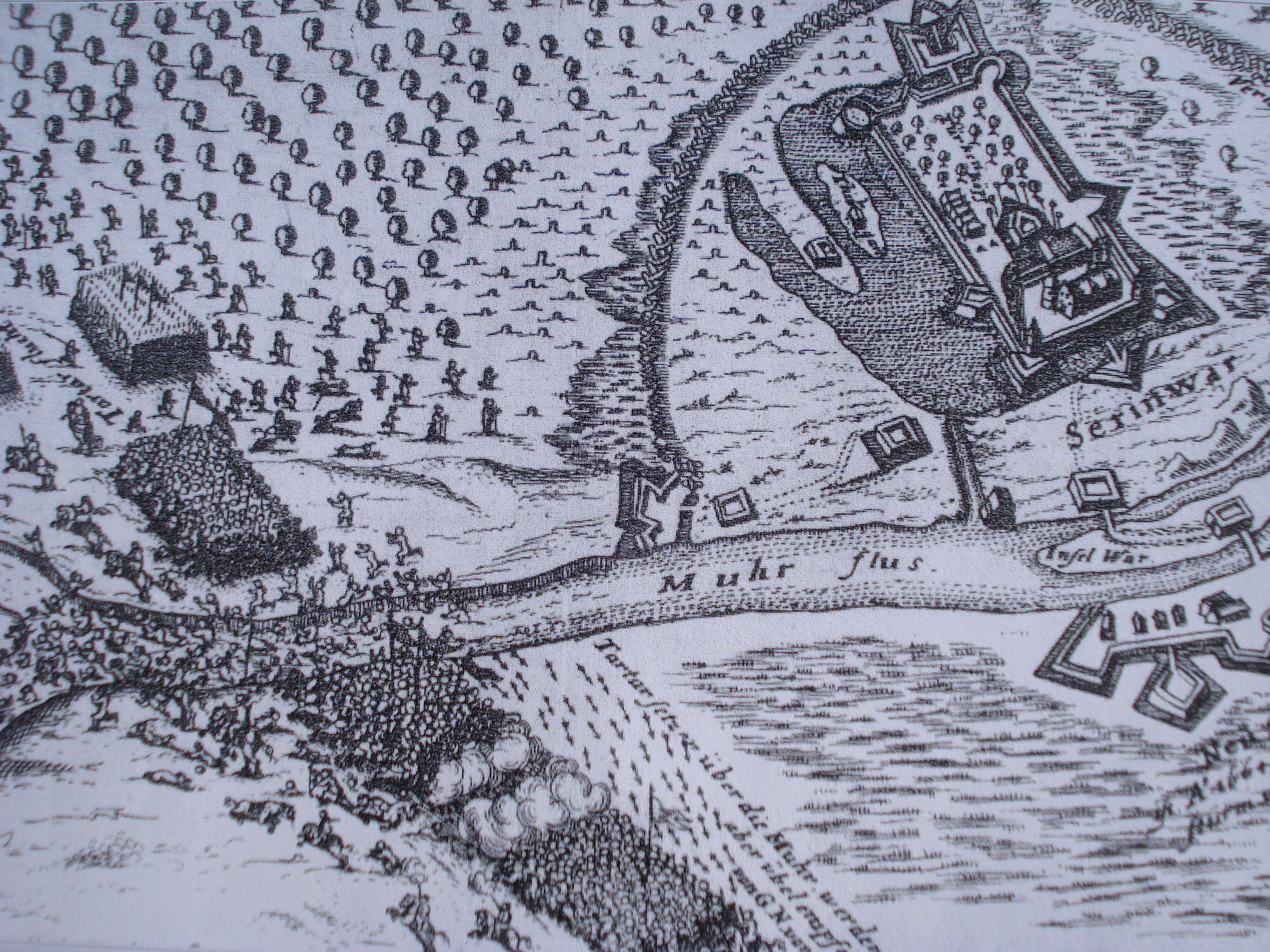
Siege of Novi Zrin

In the summer of 1663, an Ottoman army more than 100,000 strong under Grand Vizier Köprülü Fazıl Ahmed entered Habsburg Hungary and in September conquered the town of Érsekújvár (Nové Zámky).

The Habsburg commander Montecuccoli had only his 12,000 men and the 15,000 Hungarian-Croatian troops of Nikola Zrinski to oppose them.

Emperor Leopold I summoned the Imperial Diet in January 1663, to ask the German and European Kings for help, with success. An army of 30,000 Bavarian, Brandenburg and Saxon troops was raised. Even arch-enemy Louis XIV of France sent an army corps of 6,000 under Jean de Coligny-Saligny in support.

After capturing Nové Zámky in 1663, Ottoman Turks and Tatars invaded Moravia. The invasion devastated eastern and southern Moravia, and the towns of Vsetín, Uherský Brod, Uherské Hradiště, Hodonín, Břeclav and Hustopeče were pillaged. Thousands of Moravians were killed and the Ottomans took 40,000 captives to be sold as slaves.

== 1664 campaign ==
At the beginning of 1664, the Imperial Army was divided into three corps: In the south, 17,000 Hungarian-Croatian troops under the command of Nikola Zrinski. In the center, the main army of Montecuccoli, which was 28,500 men strong, and in the north some 8,500 men under General Jean-Louis Raduit de Souches. There were some 12,500 men in reserve to defend the fortresses.

This army of 66,500 men was not united, as the differences of opinion between the commanders were very strong, especially with Zrinski.

As a preparation for campaigns planned for 1664, Zrinski set out to destroy the strongly fortified Ottoman bridge (the Osijek (Hung.:Eszék) bridge) which, since 1566, had linked Darda (Hung.:Dárda) to Osijek across the Drava and the marshes of Baranya. Destruction of the bridge would cut off the retreat of the Ottoman Army and make their reinforcement impossible for several months. Re-capturing strong fortresses (Berzence, Babócsa, the town of Pécs, etc.) on his way, Zrinski advanced 240 kilometers on Ottoman territory and destroyed the bridge on February 1, 1664. He did not succeed in conquering Nagykanizsa, the main objective. The siege had to be lifted when in June the main army of Köprülü approached.

The Ottoman grand vizier aimed to force the Habsburg troops into battle and marched on Zrinski's stronghold Novi Zrin. His army besieged and conquered the fortress after Montecuccoli refused a relief attack with inferior numbers and retreated to the Rába river.

== Battle of Saint Gotthard ==
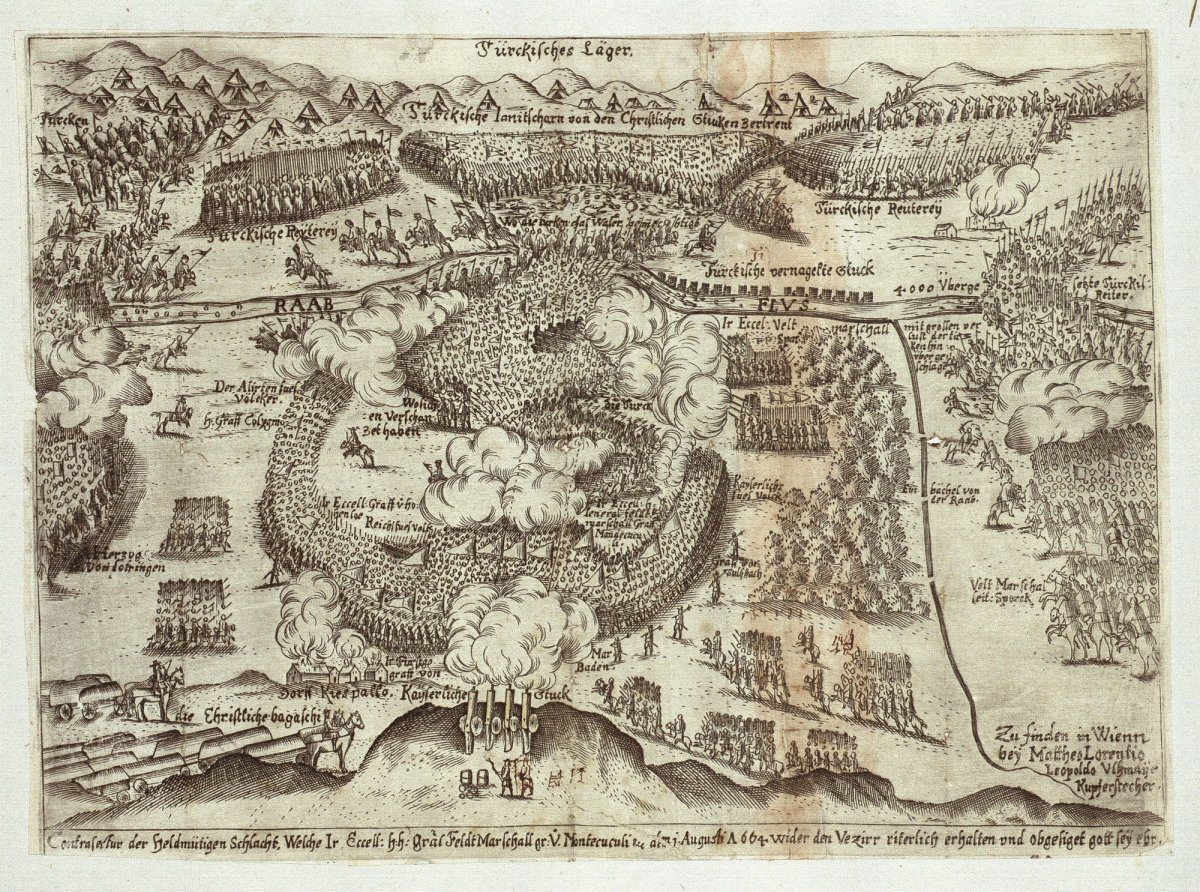
Battle of Mogersdorf/Saint Gotthard/Szentgotthard (1664)

After the conquest of Novi Zrin, the Ottoman main army marched towards Vienna. As the Ottoman army advanced into Hungary, it was stopped at the Rába river between Mogersdorf and the Szentgotthárd Abbey by Montecuccoli's army, where the Ottomans were charged and defeated by the Imperial forces.

In the north of Hungary the army of de Souches had also won some smaller victories against Küçük Mehmed Pasha. Most importantly, he reconquered Nitra and Léva.

== Peace of Vasvár ==
Nine days later, on August 10, 1664, the Peace of Vasvár was signed. The Habsburgs recognized Ottoman control of Transylvania, Nagyvarad (Grosswardein) and Ersekujvar (Neuhausel), Habsburg troops were to be removed from Transylvania and had to turn over numerous border fortresses, and they agreed to pay an annual 200,000 florins to the Ottoman Empire. In contrast, the Ottomans agreed to send annual "gifts" to the Habsburg Emperor of the same worth, allow the construction of a Habsburg fort along the Waag river, and granted a twenty-year truce.

The major factor in the Habsburgs' decision for a peace treaty was the French threat to the much more valuable estates in the Netherlands, Germany and Italy. Moreover, the Imperial war effort lost some of its momentum after the victory of Saint Gotthard, as the French withdrew from the coalition while other German princes were reluctant to advance further east. Hence, the Austrians did not believe they could liberate the whole of Hungary and were unwilling to leave the French advance unchecked for a few Hungarian fortresses.

== Consequences ==
The Croats and Hungarians were outraged at the loss of the conquered territories and felt the initiative and momentum after the victory of Saint Gotthard should have been maintained. The discontent from the Vasvar treaty led to the Magnate conspiracy.

The peace held for 20 years until the Ottomans attacked Vienna for the second time in 1683 and were pushed back from Hungary in the following Great Turkish War (1683–1699).

== Sources ==
- Ágoston, Gábor (2021). The Last Muslim Conquest: The Ottoman Empire and Its Wars in Europe. Princeton University Press.
- Bodart, Gaston (1908). Militär-historisches Kriegs-Lexikon (1618–1905).
- Carsten, F. L., ed. (1961). The New Cambridge Modern History: Volume 5, The Ascendancy of France, 1648-88. Cambridge University Press.
- Gagliardo, John G. (1991). Germany under the Old Regime 1600-1790. Routledge.
- Hochedlinger, Michael (2015). Austria's Wars of Emergence, 1683-1797. Taylor & Francis.
- Lipp, Charles T. (2011). Noble Strategies in an Early Modern Small State: The Mahuet of Lorraine. University of Rochester Press.
- Lodge, Richard (1908). "Austria, Poland, and Turkey". In Ward, Adolphus William; Prothero, George Walter; Leathes, Stanley Mordaunt (eds.). The Cambridge Modern History. Vol. 5:The Age of Louis XIV. Cambridge at the University Press.
- Pálffy, Géza (2021). Hungary Between Two Empires 1526–1711. Translated by Evans, David Robert. Indiana University Press.
- Šístek, František (2021). Imagining Bosnian Muslims in Central Europe: Representations, Transfers and Exchanges. Berghahn Books.
- Tucker, Spencer C., ed. (2010). "1663-1664:Central Europe: Hungary". A Global Chronology of Conflict: From the Ancient World to the Modern Middle East. Vol. Two:1500-1774. ABC-CLIO. p. 641.
- Tucker, Spencer C., ed. (2019). "Vasvar, Treaty of (August 10, 1664)". Middle East Conflicts from Ancient Egypt to the 21st Century: An Encyclopedia and Document Collection. Vol. III. ABC-CLIO.
- White, George W. (1999). "Transylvania: Hungarian, Romanian, or Neither?". In Herb, Guntram Henrik; Kaplan, David H. (eds.). Nested Identities: Nationalism, Territory, and Scale. Rowman and Littlefield.
- Wilson, Peter H. (2016). Heart of Europe: A History of the Holy Roman Empire. Cambridge, MA: Belknap Press.
