= Novi Zrin =

17th century castle ruin in Croatia

Novi Zrin / Zrínyiújvár
- Confluence of Mura and Drava rivers, Croatia
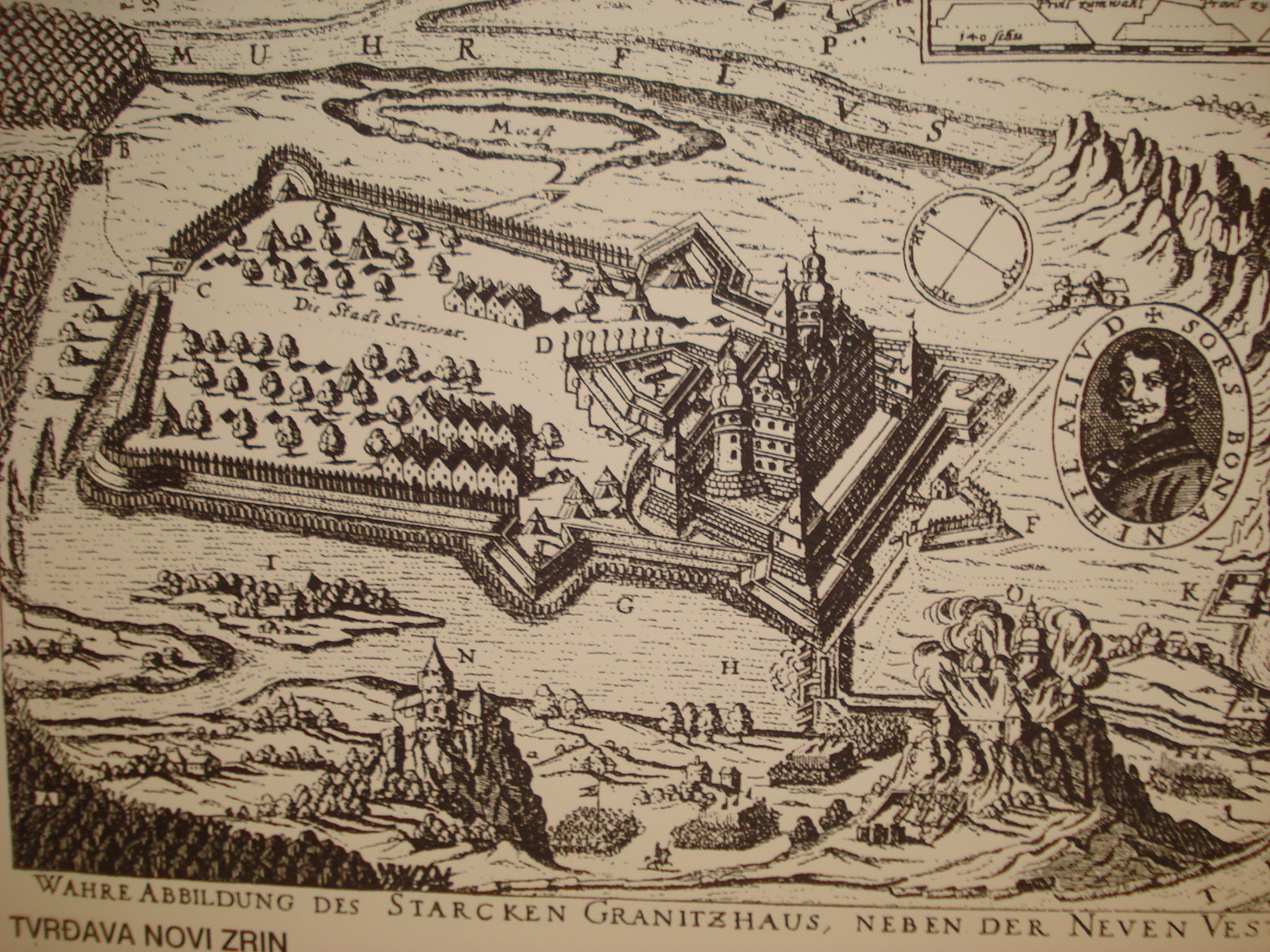
- Illustration of Novi Zrin Fortress in 1664, before it was destroyed.

Site information
- Type: Marsh castle
- Owner: Nikola VII. Zrinski
- Condition: Destroyed

Location
- Coordinates: 46°19′25″N 16°52′42″E

Site history
- Built: 17th century
- In use: 1661 - 1664
- Materials: stone
- Demolished: Destroyed by the Ottoman army in 1664
- Battles/wars: First Battle of Novi Zrin; Second Battle of Novi Zrin; Siege of Novi Zrin

Novi Zrin (Hungarian: Zrínyiújvár or Új-Zrínyivár) was a fortress of the Zrinski (Zrínyi in Hungarian) noble family built near the Donja Dubrava village in the northernmost part of Croatia (at the border village of Őrtilos in Hungary) on the mouth of river Mura into Drava between 1661 and 1664.

Its purpose was to prevent the Ottoman military forces from advancing further into Croatia. The Ottomans attacked it several times from 1662 to 1664, but did not manage to conquer it. Finally, at the beginning of June 1664 a large Ottoman army, numbering up to 100,000 men, led personally by the Grand Vizier Köprülü Fazıl Ahmed Pasha, besieged it and destroyed on 7 July 1664.

== Gallery ==
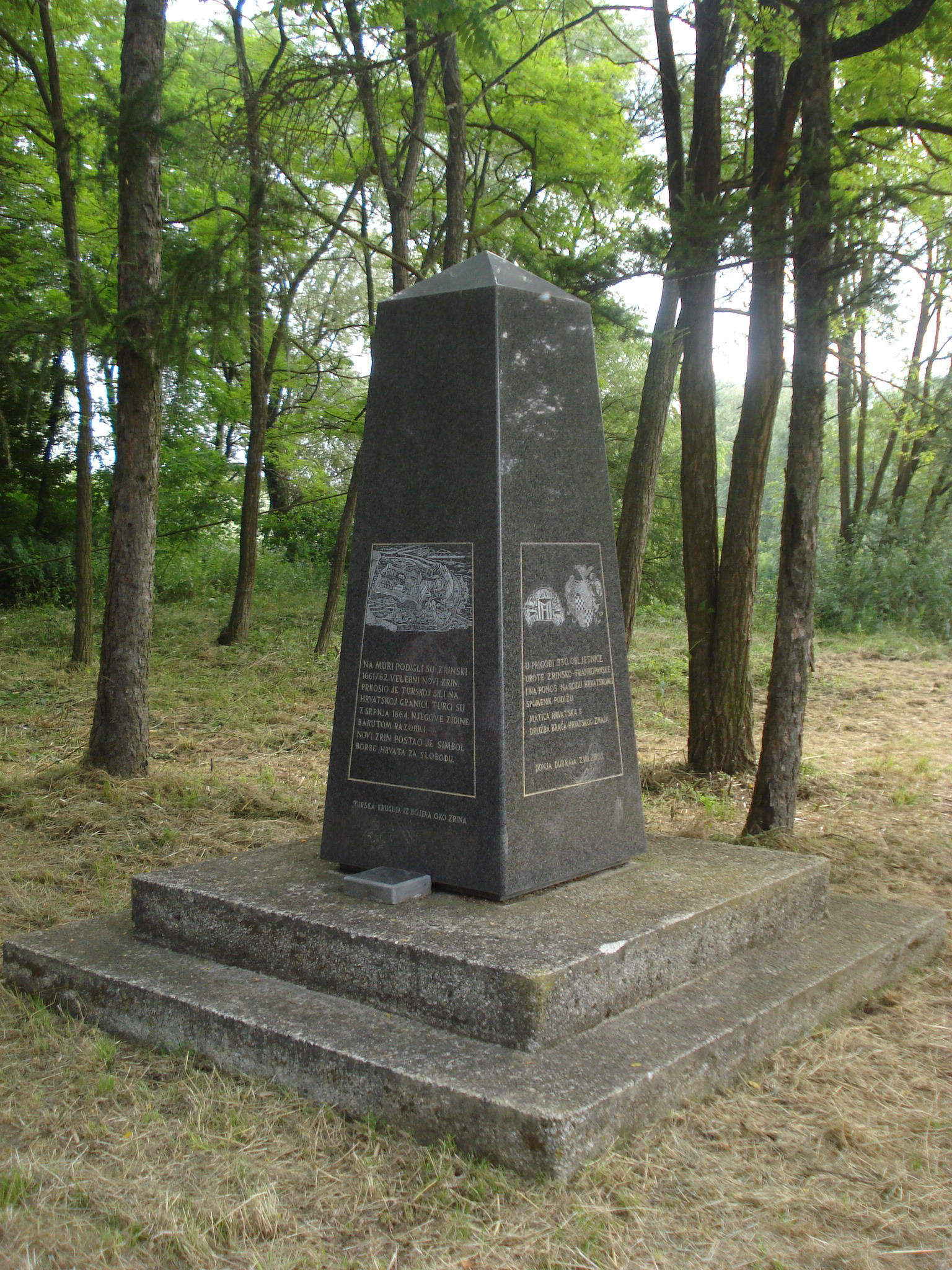
Memorial obelisk on the place at the Mura River where the castle once was

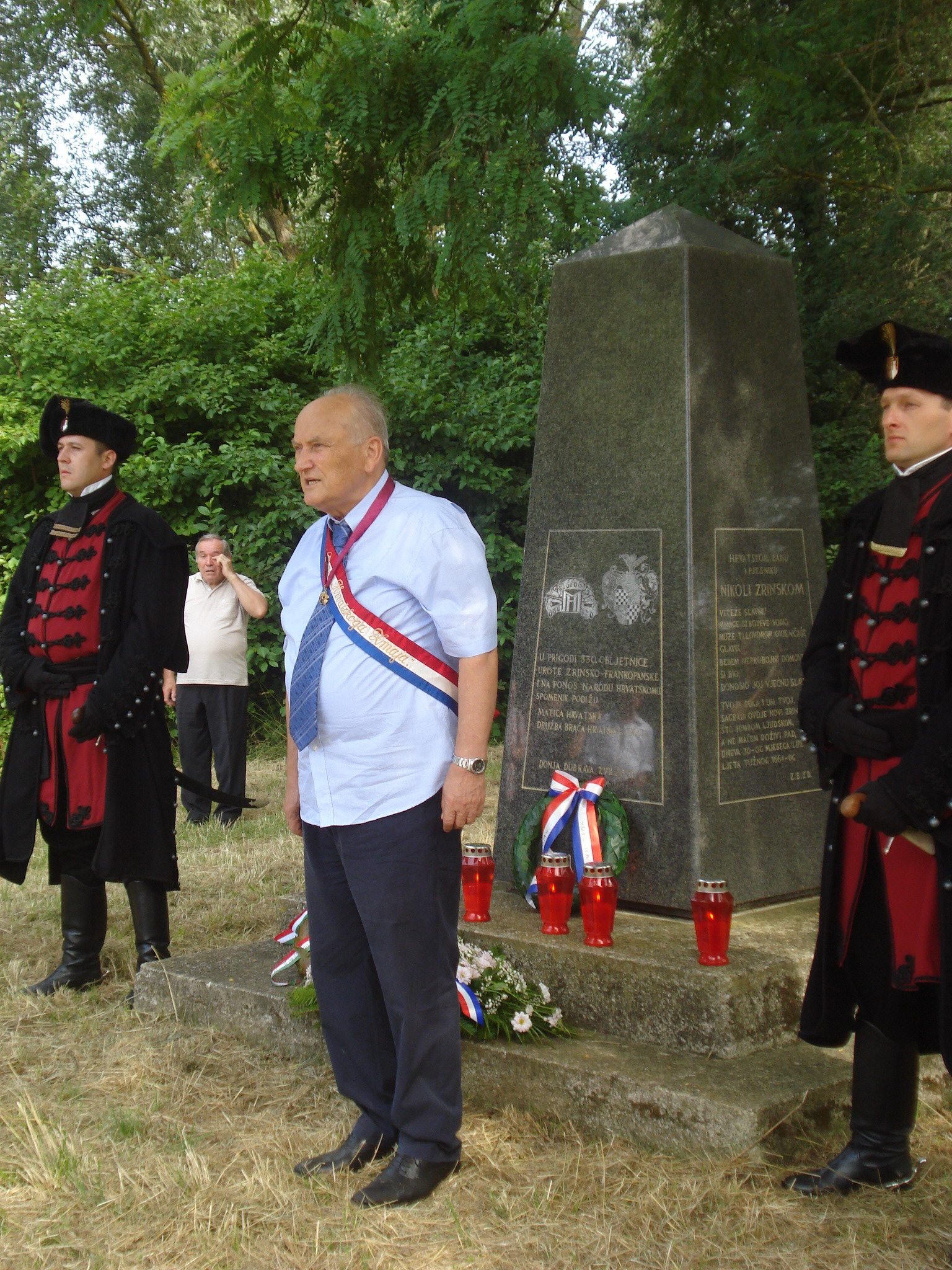
350th Anniversary commemoration of the destruction of the castle

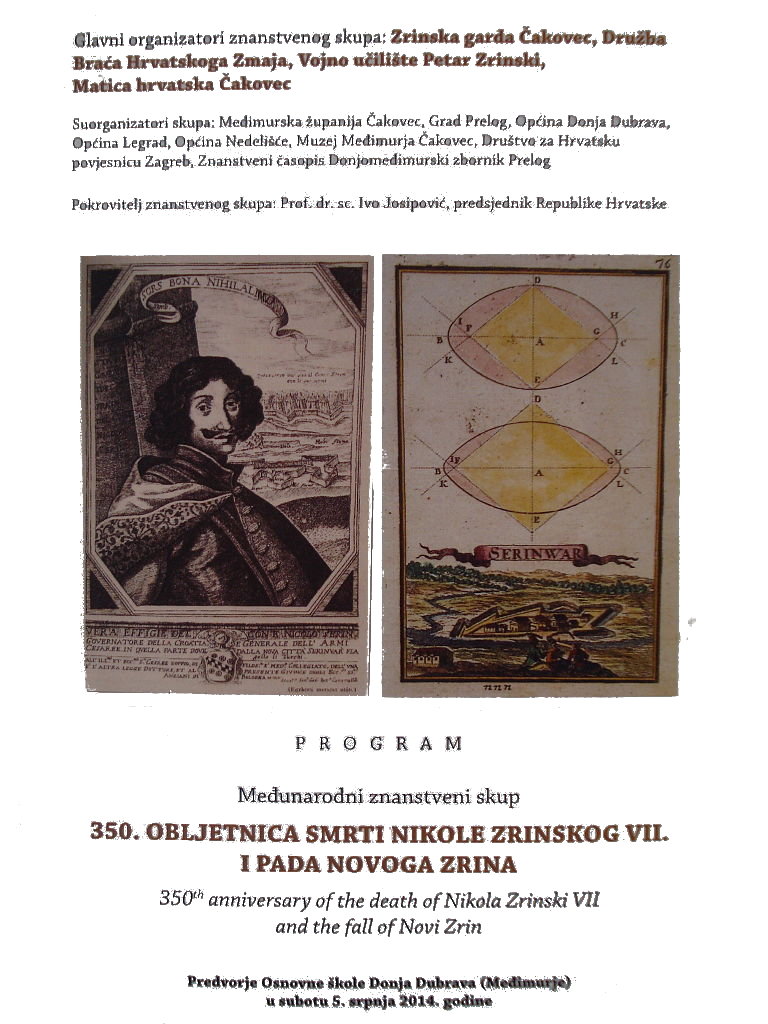
Programme booklet of the International scientific conference concerning the 350th anniversary of the death of Nikola VII Zrinski and the fall of Novi Zrin Castle (Donja Dubrava, Međimurje County, 5 July 2014)

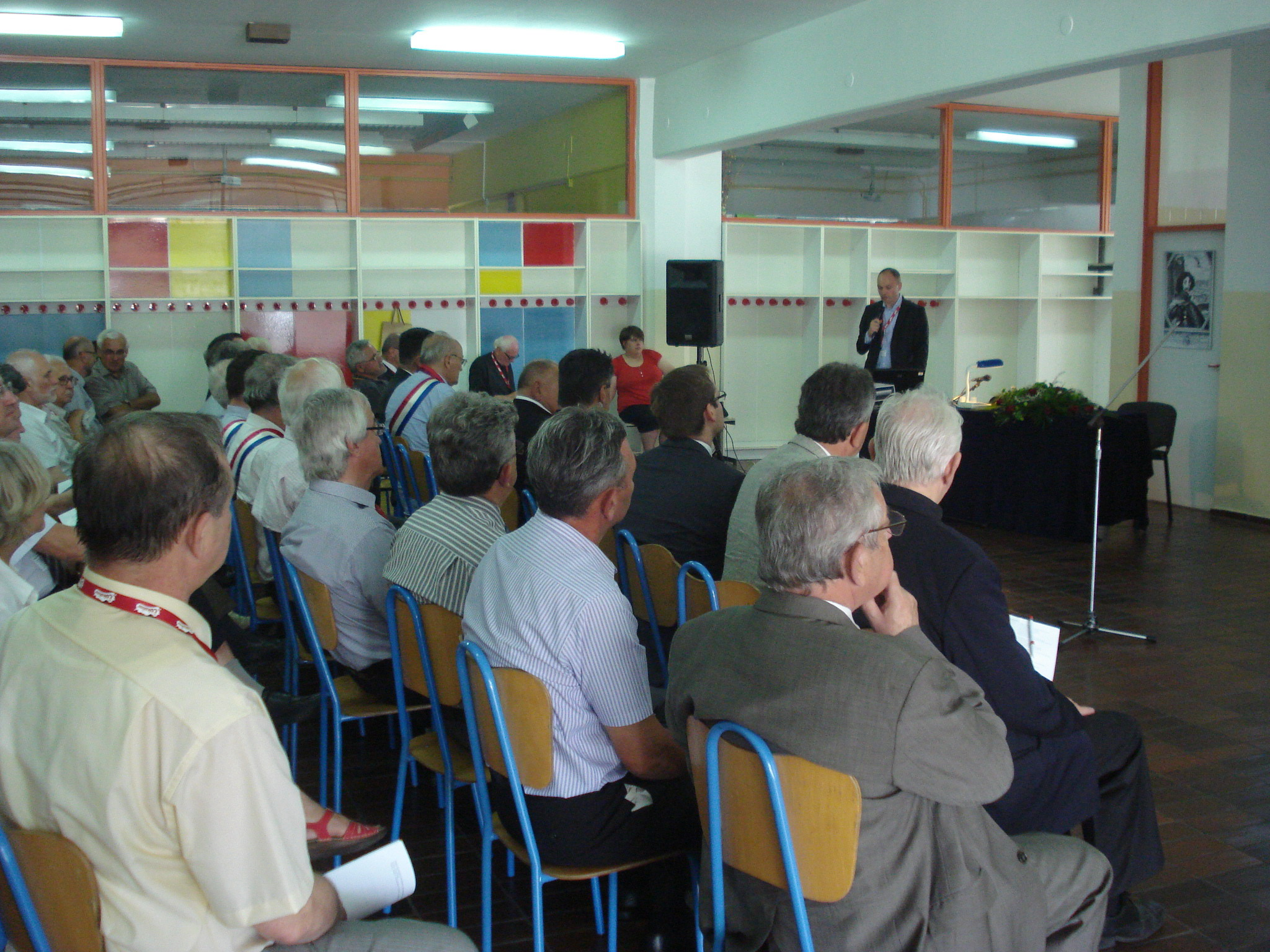
Scene of the International scientific conference held in Donja Dubrava on 5 July 2014

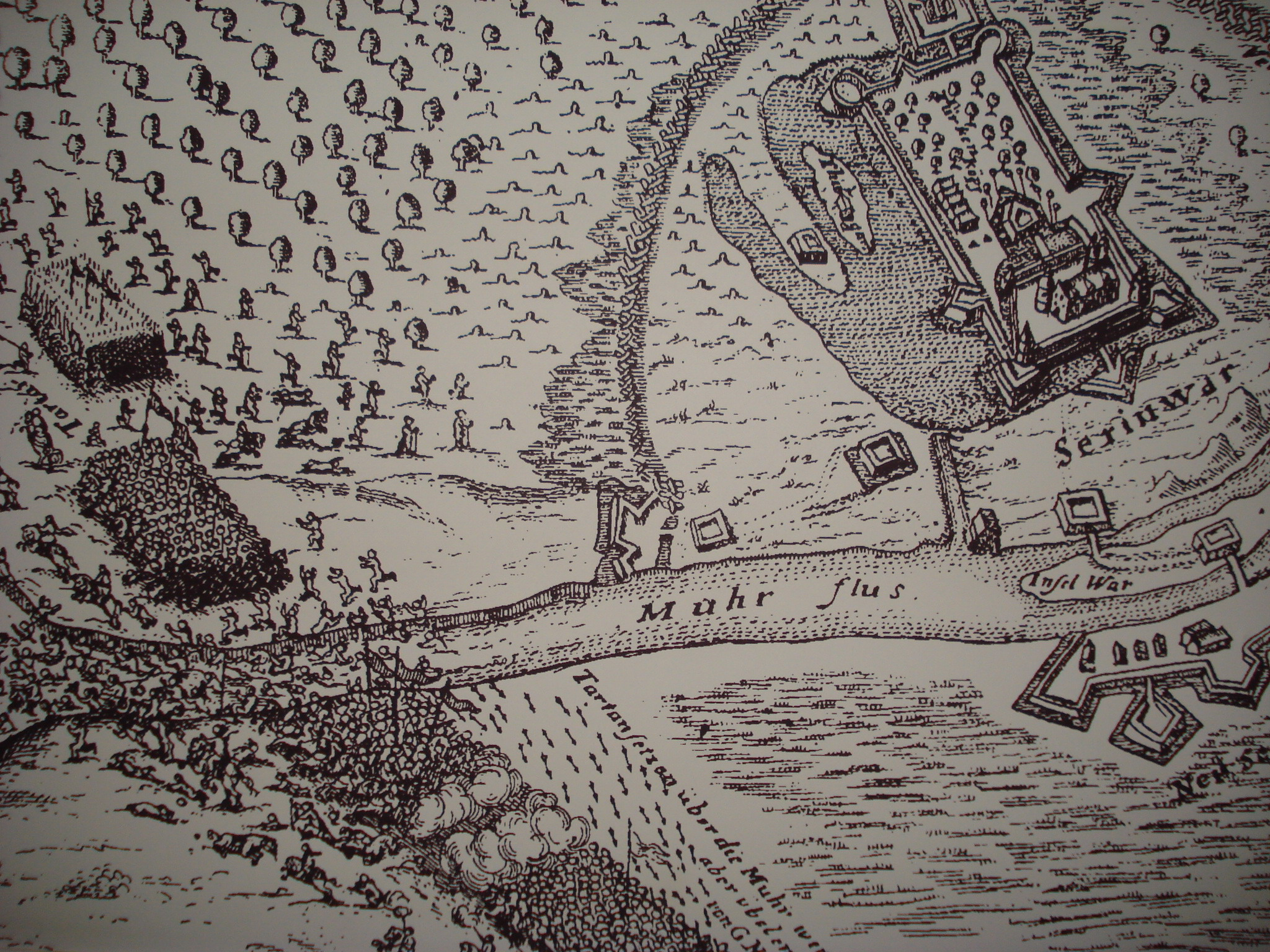
Illustration of one of the battles in 1663 when Ottomans failed to capture the fort.

== See also ==
- First Battle of Novi Zrin
- Second Battle of Novi Zrin
- Siege of Novi Zrin (1664)
- Nikola VII Zrinski

== Bibliography ==
- Petrić, Hrvoje; Feletar, Dragutin; Feletar, Petar (2001). Novi Zrin (1661-1664). Zagreb: Meridijani. ISBN 953-6235-84-6.
