= Peace of Vasvár =

Treaty ending the Austro-Turkish War (1664)

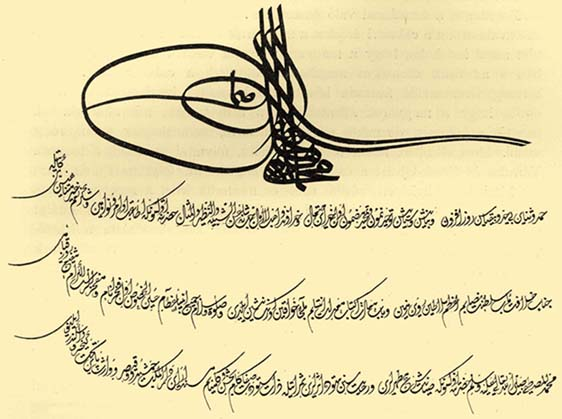
The Peace of Vasvár (Turkish version)

The Peace of Vasvár, signed in Vasvár, was a treaty between the Habsburg monarchy and the Ottoman Empire which followed the Battle of Saint Gotthard of 1 August 1664 (near Mogersdorf, Burgenland), and concluded the Austro-Turkish War (1663–64). It held for about 20 years, until 1683, during which border skirmishing escalated to a full-scale war.

At the time of signing, the military of the Habsburgs was in a better position than that of the Ottomans. Instead of maintaining initiative and momentum, negotiations began and fighting stopped. In fact, Leopold I, Holy Roman Emperor wanted peace to be signed so that he could be better prepared against France. However, factions within the monarchy insisted on further operations, particularly Croats and Hungarians, mainly because most of their territory was in Ottoman hands, and they wanted to use the opportunity to reclaim their land. Noble Croatian families, the Zrinski and the Frankopan, viewed the treaty as particularly supplicating to the Ottomans, as they actually had to give up territories that had just been liberated back to the Ottomans as terms of the treaty. Some of the territories had belonged to them before the occupation. The treaty caused internal strife and instability in the monarchy, which would eventually culminate with the rebellion of the two Croatian noble families and Hungarian nobles led by Ferenc Rákóczi I against the king of Hungary (also Emperor to the German states in the monarchy).

With the treaty, Ottoman control of Transylvania and Uyvar (administered as the Uyvar Eyalet of the Empire) was recognized, as well as both empires paying a financial tribute (presented as a "gift") to the other. That was the only time the French king, a traditional ally of the Ottomans since Francis I, fought against them. It was also one of the major factors in the Habsburgs' decision, as the much more valuable estates in the Holy Roman Empire and Italy were threatened by France. The concessions were very minor for the Austrians, as their emperor could now turn to western affairs. The Habsburgs also received some economic rights in the Ottoman realm and they agreed to pay an annual 200,000 florins to the Ottoman Empire.

== See also ==
- Magnate conspiracy
- Siege of Érsekújvár (1663)
