= Miklós Zrínyi =

Croatian-Hungarian military commander (1620–1664)

Nikola Zrinski
- Ban (viceroy) of Croatia
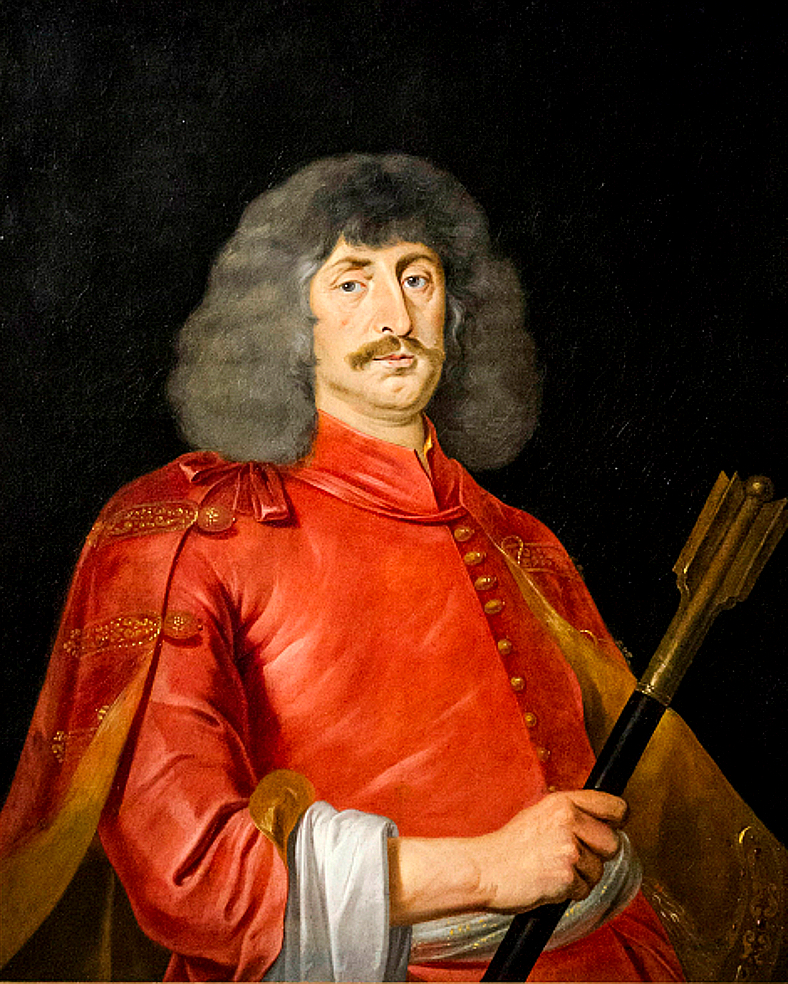
- Portrait of Nikola Zrinski by Jan Thomas van Ieperen, Lobkowicz Palace, Prague.

Ban of Croatia
- Reign: 1647–1664
- Predecessor: Ivan III Drašković
- Successor: Petar Zrinski
- Born: 5 January 1620; Csáktornya, Kingdom of Hungary (now Čakovec, Croatia)
- Died: 18 November 1664 (aged 44); Kursanecz, Kingdom of Hungary (now Kuršanec, Croatia)
- Noble family: House of Zrinski
- Spouses: Marija Euzebija Drašković; Marija Sofija Löbl
- Father: Juraj V Zrinski
- Mother: Magdolna Széchy

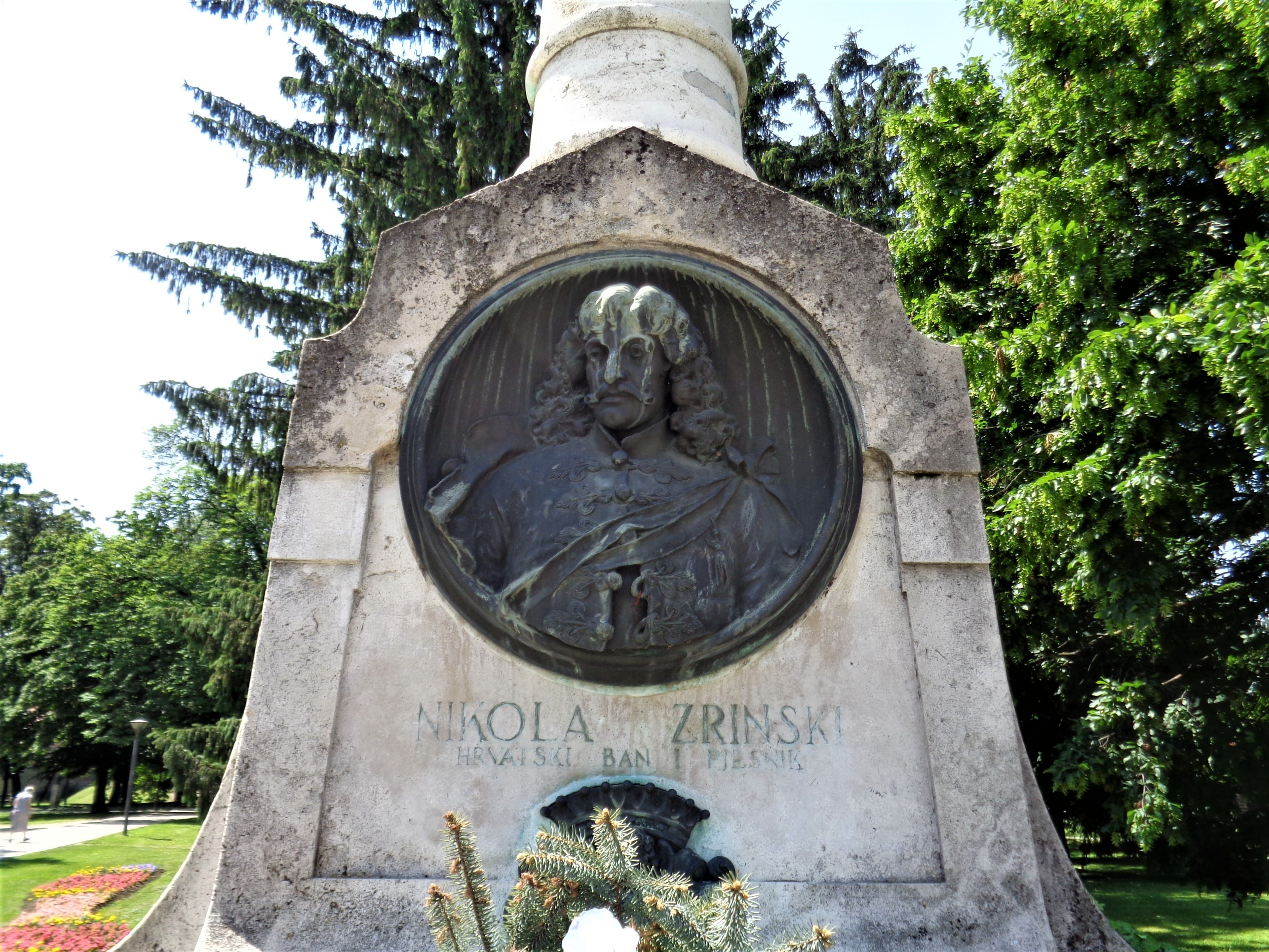
Nikola Zrinski monument in Zrinski Park in Čakovec, Croatia

Miklós Zrínyi (Croatian: Nikola VII. Zrinski, Hungarian: Zrínyi Miklós; 5 January 1620 – 18 November 1664) was a Croatian and Hungarian military leader, statesman and poet. He was a member of the House of Zrinski, a Croatian-Hungarian noble family. He is the author of the first epic poem, The Peril of Sziget, in Hungarian literature.

== Biography ==
Nikola was born in Csáktornya, Kingdom of Hungary (now Čakovec, Croatia) to the Croatian Juraj V Zrinski and the Hungarian Magdolna (Magdalena) Széchy. At the court of Péter Pázmány, he was an enthusiastic student of Hungarian language and literature, although he prioritized military training. From 1635 to 1637, he accompanied Szenkviczy, one of the canons of Esztergom, on a long educative tour through the Italian Peninsula.

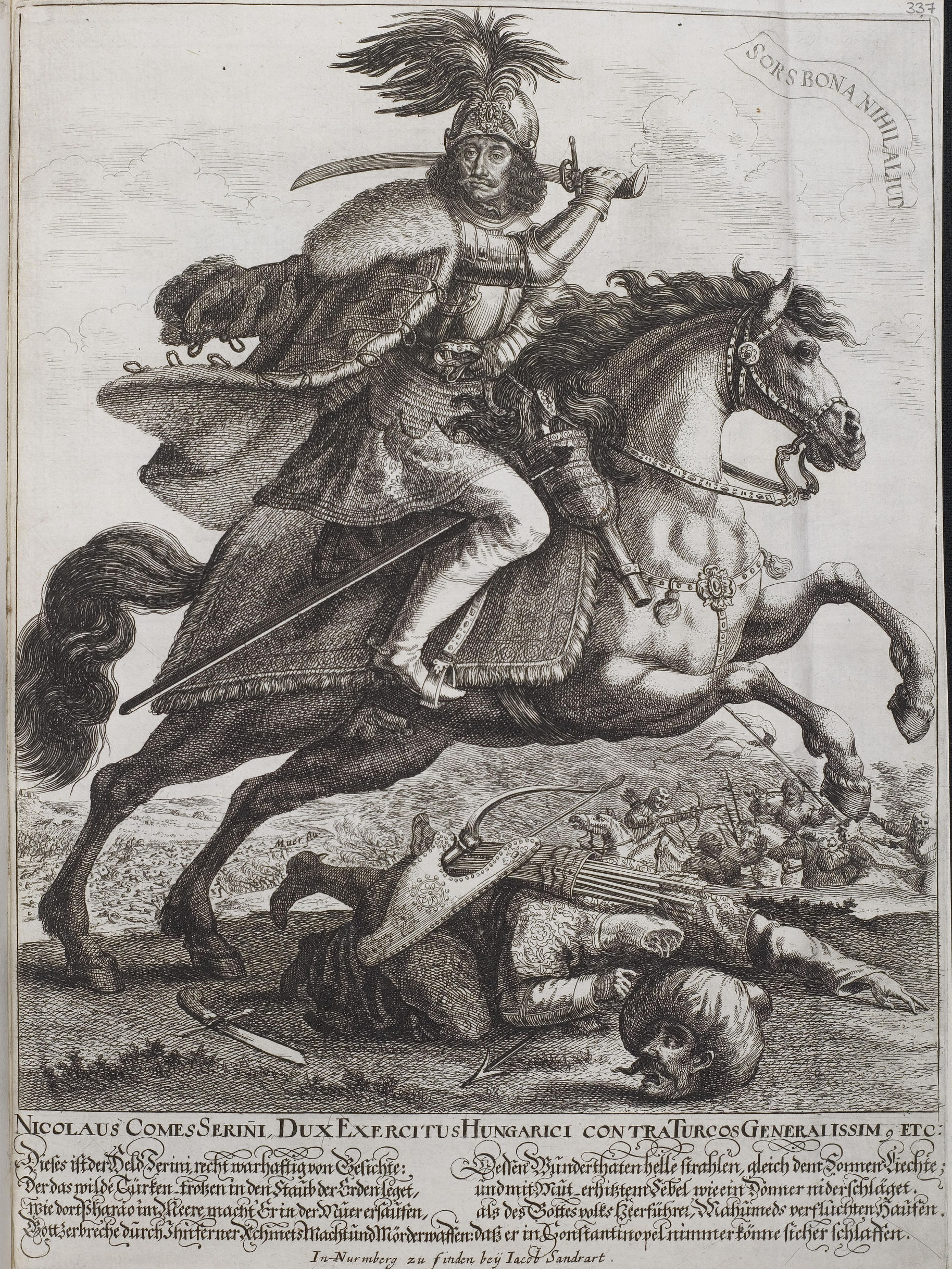
Contemporary drawing showing Nikola Zrinski in battle against Ottomans.

Over the next few years, he learned the art of war in defending the Croatian frontier against the Ottoman Empire, and proved himself one of the most important commanders of the age. In 1645, during the closing stages of the Thirty Years' War, he acted against the Swedish troops in Moravia, equipping an army corps at his own expense. At Szakolcza he scattered a Swedish division and took 2,000 prisoners. At Eger he saved the Holy Roman Emperor, Ferdinand III, who had been surprised at night in his camp by the offensive of Carl Gustaf Wrangel.

Although he was not enthusiastic about having to fight against fellow Hungarians, subsequently he routed the army of George I Rákóczi, Ottoman-backed Prince of Transylvania, on the Upper Tisza. For his services, the emperor appointed him captain of Croatia. On his return from the war he married the wealthy Eusebia Drašković.

In 1646 he distinguished himself in the actions against Ottomans. At the coronation of Ferdinand IV of Austria, King of the Germans, King of Hungary, Croatia and Bohemia, he carried the sword of state, and was made ban and captain-general of Croatia. In this double capacity he presided over many Croatian diets.

During 1652 and 1653, Zrínyi was continually fighting against the Ottomans – nevertheless, from his castle at Csáktornya (Čakovec) he was in constant communication with the intellectual figures of his time; the Dutch scholar, Jacobus Tollius, even visited him, and has left in his Epistolae itinerariae a lively account of his experiences. Tollius was amazed at the linguistic resources of Zrínyi, who spoke Croatian, Hungarian, Italian, German, Ottoman Turkish and Latin with equal ease. Zrínyi's Latin letters (from which it was gathered that he was married a second time, to Sophia Löbl) are, according to the Encyclopædia Britannica Eleventh Edition of 1911, "fluent and agreeable, but largely interspersed with Croatian and Magyar expressions". In a Latin letter from 1658 to friend Ivan Ručić expressed his consciousness of being an ethnic Croat and Zrinski ("Ego mihi conscius aliter sum, etenim non degenerem me Croatam et quidem Zrinium esse scio").

In 1655, he made an attempt to be elected Palatine of Hungary (nádor); in spite of support by the petty nobility, his efforts failed. The king, reacting to Zrínyi's good connections to Protestants and the Hungarians of Transylvania, nominated Ferenc Wesselényi instead.

== Activities in 1664 ==
The last year of his life was also a culmination of his efforts and prestige. In 1663, the Ottoman army, led by Grand Vizier Köprülü Ahmed, launched an overwhelming offensive against Royal Hungary, ultimately aiming at the siege and occupation of Vienna. The imperial army failed to put up any notable resistance; the Ottoman army was eventually stopped by adverse weather conditions. As a preparation for the new Ottoman onslaught due next year, German troops were recruited from the Holy Roman Empire and aid was called from France, and Zrínyi, under the overall command of the Italian Raimondo Montecuccoli, leader of the Imperial army, was named commander-in-chief of the Hungarian army.

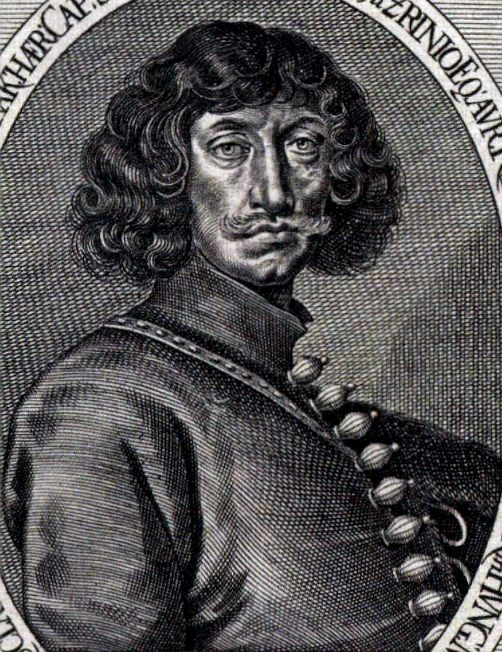
Engraving of Zrinski

As a preparation for campaigns planned for 1664, Zrínyi set out to destroy the strongly fortified Suleiman Bridge (the Osijek (Hungarian: Eszék) bridge) which, since 1566, had linked Darda to Osijek (across the Drava and the marshes of Baranya). Destruction of the bridge would cut off the retreat of the Ottoman Army and make any Turkish reinforcement impossible for several months. Re-capturing strong fortresses (Berzence, Babócsa, the town of Pécs, etc.) on his way, Zrínyi advanced 240 kilometers on enemy territory and destroyed the bridge on 1 February 1664. However, the further pursuance of the campaign was frustrated by the refusal of the Imperial generals to co-operate. The court remained suspicious of Zrínyi all the way, regarding him as a promoter of Hungarian secessionist ideas and accusing him of having disturbed the peace by building his castle, Novi Zrin (Hungarian: Új-Zrínyivár or Zrínyi-Újvár, English: New Zrin or Zrin-Newcastle), erected in 1661 at his own expense, in the theoretically de-militarised zone between the two empires. Zrínyi's siege of Kanizsa, the most important Turkish fortress in Southern Hungary, failed, as the beginning of the siege was seriously delayed by machinations of the overly jealous Montecuccoli, and later the Emperor's military commanders (apart from Hungarian and Croatian leaders), unwilling to combat the Grand Vizier's army hastily coming to the aid of Kanizsa, retreated.

Despite the failed siege, the expedition made his name famous and praised throughout Europe. According to the 1911 Britannica, "it was said that only the Zrínyis had the secret of conquering the Turks". Emperor Leopold offered him the title of prince, while Pope Alexander VII struck a commemorative medal with the effigy of Zrínyi as a field marshal, the Spanish King Philip IV sent him the Order of the Golden Fleece, and France's King Louis XIV created him a Peer.

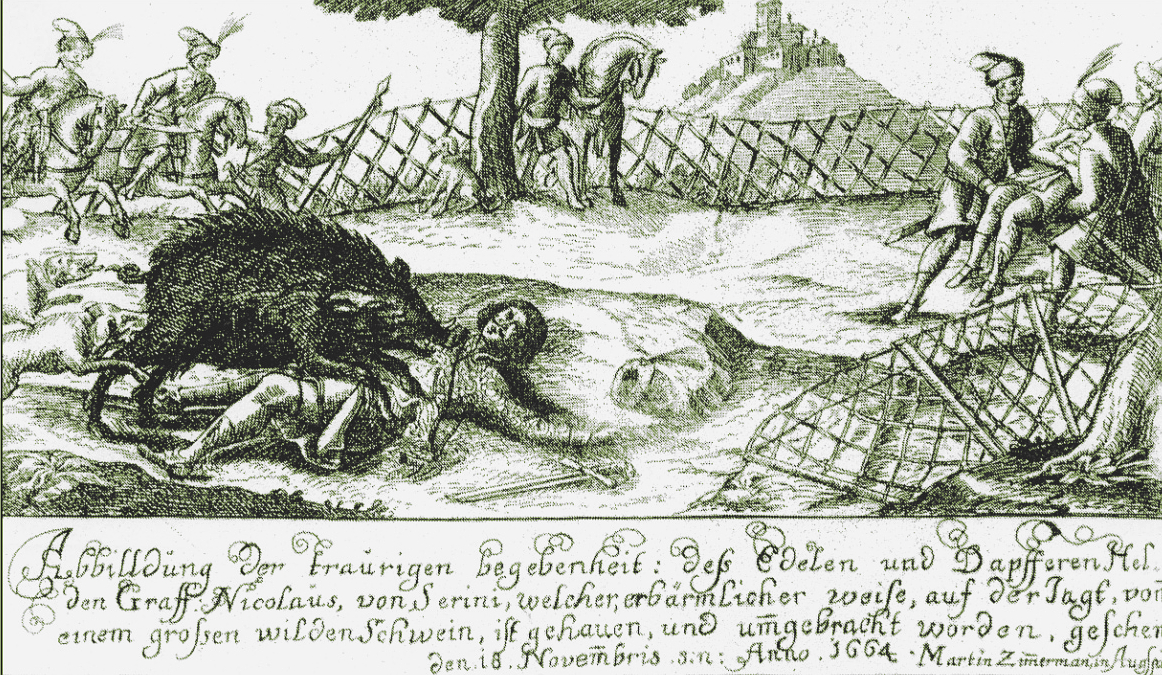
Contemporary drawing showing the death of Zrinski on 18 November 1664.

After relieving Kanizsa, the Grand Vizier turned against Novi Zrin. The Imperial troops under Raimondo Montecuccoli remained inactive while Zrínyi hastened to relieve the castle, refusing all assistance, with the result that the fortress fell. The Viennese court concentrated all its troops on the Hungarian-Austrian border, sacrificing Novi Zrin to hold back the Turkish army. The Turkish army, ultimately, was stopped in the Battle of Saint Gotthard (1664). The Turkish defeat could have offered an opportunity for Hungary to be liberated from the Turkish yoke. However, the Habsburg court chose not to push its advantage in order to save its strength for the brewing conflict with France over the Spanish succession. The Peace of Vasvár laid down unfavourable terms, including a tribute to the Sublime Porte (which would never be paid) against a few presents from the Ottomans - all despite the fact that Austrian-Hungarian troops maintained the upper hand.

Zrínyi rushed to Vienna to protest against the treaty, but his view was ignored; he left the city in disgust, after assuring the Venetian minister, Sagridino, that he was willing at any moment to assist the Republic against the Ottoman Empire with 6,000 men. Zrínyi then returned to Csáktornya (Čakovec). It is widely accepted that he, despite being a loyal supporter of the court before, participated in launching the conspiracy which later became known as the Wesselényi conspiracy, aimed at the restoration of the independent Kingdom of Croatia and Kingdom of Hungary. However, on November 18, he was killed in a hunting accident in a place called Kursanecz (today Kuršanec, Croatia), by a wounded wild boar. To this day, rumors persist that he was assassinated on the order of the Imperial Court. While no conclusive evidence has ever been found to support this claim; however, it remains true that both the Habsburgs and the Ottomans lost their mightiest adversary in Hungary due to his death. The village where he died was renamed Zrínyifalva in Hungarian to commemorate him.

== Works ==
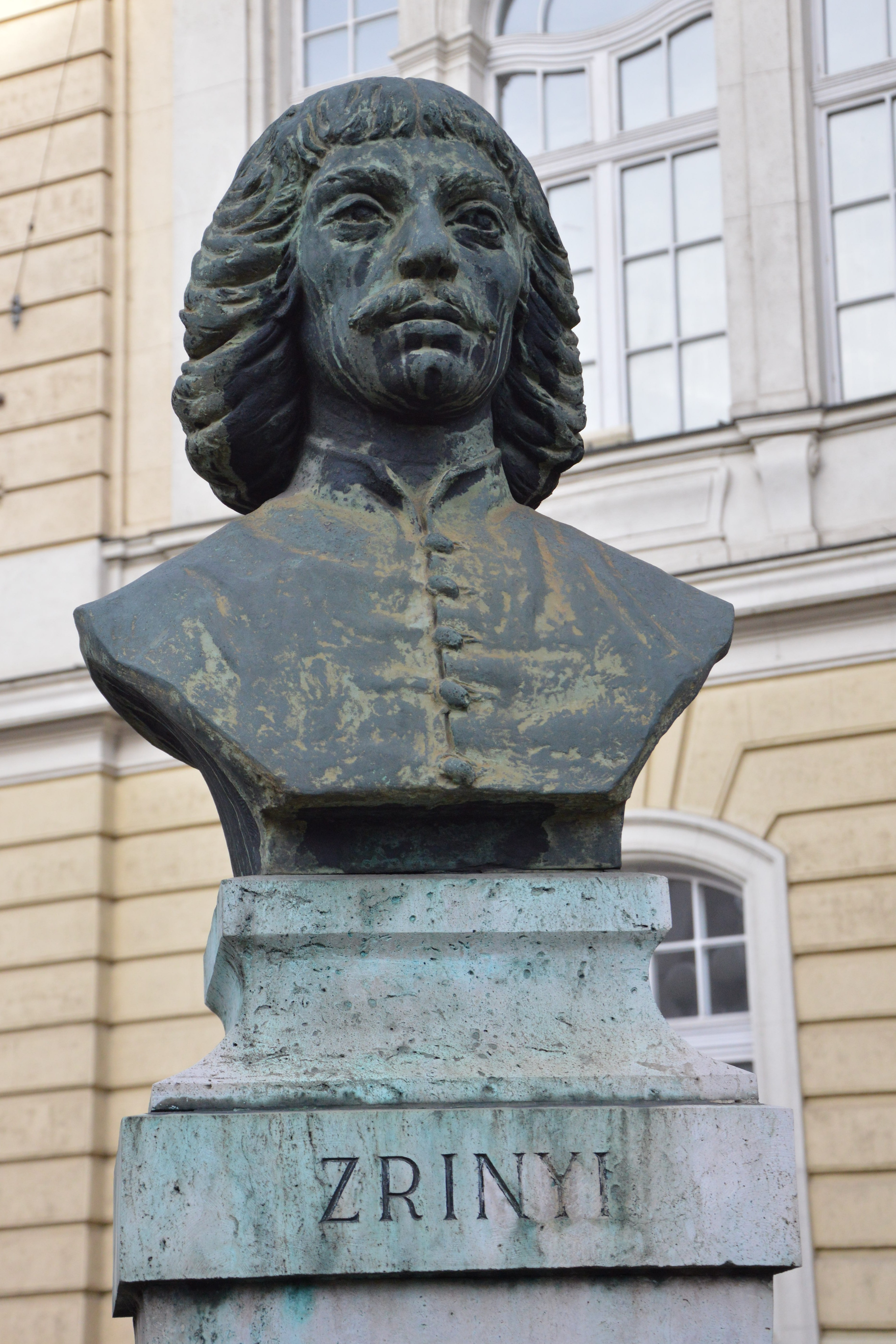
A bust of Zrinski outside the Vígszínház in Budapest

Beside being a leading military figure of 17th-century Croatia and Hungary, Zrínyi is well known for his literary works, also reflected in his often-recited epithet Zrínyi Miklós, a költő hadvezér és politikus (Hungarian for Miklós Zrínyi, the poet the general and the politician). He is the author of the first epic poem in Hungarian literature.

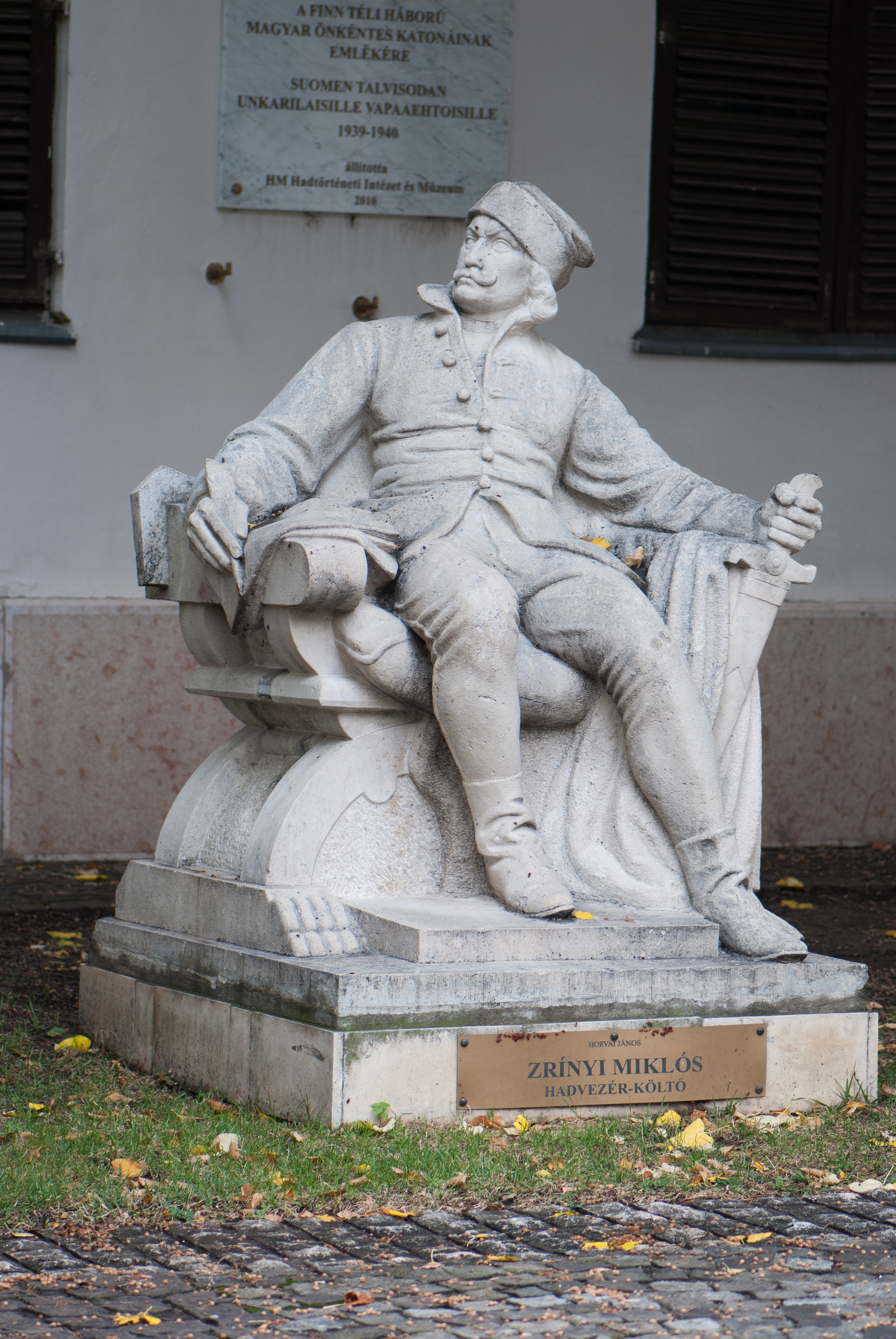
A statue of Nikola Zrinski at the Hadtorteneti Muzeum (War History Museum) in Budapest

Zrinski's most significant literary work, The Peril of Sziget (Szigeti veszedelem or Zrínyiász), an epic poem written in the Göcsej dialect of Hungarian, was written in the winter of 1648–1649, and was published, together with a few miscellaneous pieces of poetry, under the title of The Siren of the Adriatic Sea (Adriai tengernek Syrenája) in Vienna in 1651. The epic was composed in the manner of the classic epic poets, such as Virgil and their 16th century successor Torquato Tasso.

The subject is the heroic but unsuccessful defence of Szigetvár by the author's great-grandfather, Nikola IV Zrinski (Hungarian: Zrínyi Nikola(hadvezér)). Many criticized the indiscriminate use of foreign words and seemingly careless metres of the work; however, it was also much praised for its poetic strength, which made Zrínyi the most notable Hungarian poet of the 17th century. The work also earned him praise due to its fundamental idea (the strength of Hungarian/Croatian valour to overthrow Ottoman rule, with the help of God), and to its enthusiastic tone. The Peril of Sziget has drawn comparisons with the other Baroque epics of the period and despite its obsolete language being difficult to interpret to the average reader remains, to this day, one of the few pre-19th century Hungarian literary works still widely known to the public. The epic was translated to Croatian by Nikola's brother, Petar Zrinski (Hungarian: Zrínyi Péter) who, while Nikola was a master of Hungarian, excelled in Croatian.

Beside his poetic works, Zrínyi is also a forerunner of Croatian and Hungarian political thinking and military science. In his essays and manifestos, such as Ne bántsd a magyart – Az török áfium ellen való orvosság (Do not hurt the Hungarians - An antidote to the Turkish poison) or Mátyás király életéről való elmélkedések (Reflections on the life of King Matthias) he makes a case for a standing army, moral renewal of the nation, the re-establishment of the national kingdom, the unification of Royal Hungary with Transylvania, and, of course, the ousting of the Turkish occupants.

== Honors ==
Postage stamps issued: Nikola Zrínyi Stamps were issued by Hungary on 1 January 1943, 1 May 1945, 18 June 1966, 18 August 2000 in Hungarian History series, and 5 September 2008.

== See also ==
- List of Bans of Croatia
- István Gyöngyösi
- Magnate conspiracy
