= Zrinski family tree =

This is the family tree of the Princes of Zrin, a Croatian noble family, from 1347 to 1703.

Legend
| Purple | Founder | Turquoise | Ban (Viceroy) of Croatia |

Juraj I. Zrinski (died 1361)
Elizabeta I. (married Toma Kurjaković) | Pavao I. (1357 - Zagreb, 1414)
Petar I. (fl. 1408 - 1446) | Nikola I. (died 1439) | Ana I. (born 1410) (?) | Margareta I.
Mirko (fl.1423 – 1435) | Pavao II. (about 1429 - 1449) | Sofija | Petar II. (1435 – Battle of Krbava field, 1493) | Jelena Babonić, princess of Blagaj | Juraj II. (fl. 1435 - 1480) | Katarina I. | Klara | Margareta II. (about 1442 - 1488) | Ilka (about 1442 - 1488) | Martin
Pavao III. (1465 - Battle of Krbava field, 1493) | Jelena (married Ivan Karlović, Ban of Croatia) | Margareta | Bernard | Nikola III. (1489 - Zrin Castle, 1534) | Jelena Karlović, princess of Krbava | Nikola II. (fl. 1451)
Jelena (died 1573) -(married Ferenc Tahy) | Margareta III. (married Ivan Alapić) | Ivan I. (died in Vinodol, 1541) | Juraj III. (1528–1547) | Katarina Frankopan of Ozalj (died 1561) | Nikola IV., Ban of Croatia (Zrin, 1508 - Szigetvár, 1566) | Eva Rožmberk (Rosenberg) (1537–1591) | Petar III. (died in Vienna, 1547)
Ivan II. (born & died 1545) | Jelena (1546–1585) | Katarina II. (1548–1585) | Anna d'Arco (died 1570) | Juraj IV. (Čakovec, 1549 - 1603) | Sofija Stubenberg | Doroteja (1550–1617) | Krsto (1551–1573) | Uršula (1552–1593) | Barbara (born 1554.) | Margareta IV. (1555–1588) | Ana II. (born 1557) | Vuk (born 1558) | Nikola V. (1559–1605) | Magdalena (born 1561) | Ivan III. (1565–1612)
Nikola VI. (Čakovec, about 1570 - 1625) | Barbara | Elizabeta II. (married Toma Erdődy, Ban of Croatia) | Suzana (married Juraj; Lenković) | Juraj V., Ban of Croatia, (Čakovec, 1599 - Bratislava, 1626) | Magdalena Széchy
Marija Euzebija Drašković (died 1650) | Nikola VII., Ban of Croatia, (Čakovec, 1620 - Kuršanec, 1664) | Maria Sofia Löbl (died 1676) | Petar IV., Ban of Croatia, (Vrbovec, 1621 - Wiener Neustadt, 1671) | Ana Katarina Frankopan of Tržac (Bosiljevo, 1625 - Graz, 1673)
Marija Terezija Barbara (1655–1658) | Marija Katarina (born 1656) | Izak (1658–1659) | Adam (Vienna, 1662 - Battle of Slankamen, 1691) | Marija Katarina Lamberg, countess | Jelena (Ozalj, 1643 - Nicomedia, 1703), -(married F.Rákóczi) | Ivan IV. Antun (Ozalj(?), 1651 – Graz, 1703), last male Zrinski | Judita Petronila (Ozalj, 1652 - Zagreb, 1699) | Zora Veronika (Ozalj, 1658 - Klagenfurt, 1735)
{{{no issue}}}

== See also ==
- House of Zrinski
- House of Šubić
- Šubić family tree
- Frankopan family tree
- List of rulers of Croatia
