= Ilona Zrínyi =

Hungarian-Croatian noblewoman

Jelena Zrinska Zrínyi Ilona
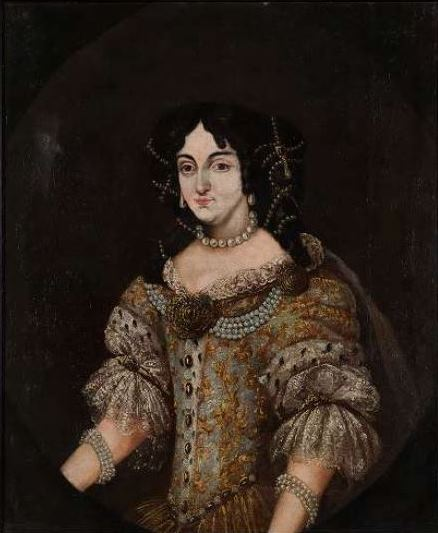
- Zrínyi Ilona (1643–1703), portrait from the Hungarian National Museum
- Born: 1643; Ozalj, Kingdom of Croatia, Habsburg Monarchy
- Died: 18 February 1703 (aged 59–60); İzmit, Ottoman Empire
- Burial: St Elisabeth Cathedral, Kassa (present-day Košice, Slovakia)
- Spouse: Francis I Rákóczi, Imre Thököly
- Issue: György (Juraj), Julianna Borbála (Julijana Barbara), Ferenc (Franjo), Erzsébet (Elizabeta)
- House: House of Zrinski
- Father: Petar Zrinski, Ban of Croatia
- Mother: Katarina Zrinska (née Frankopan)
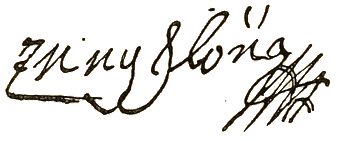
- Signature

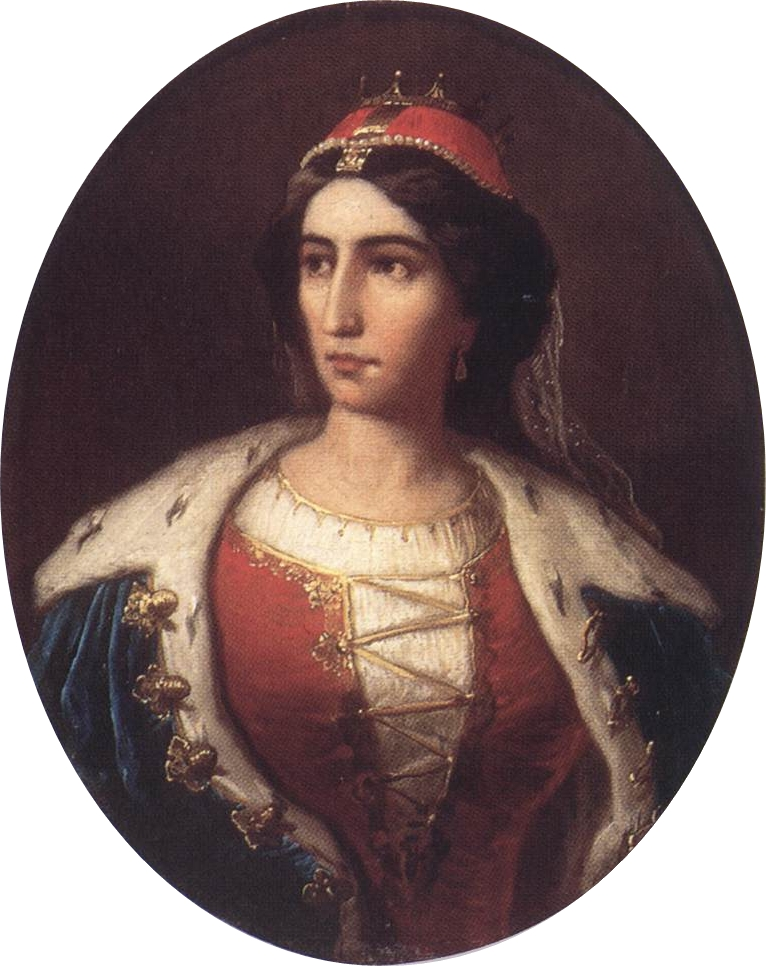
Ilona Zrínyi, as painted by Károly Jakobey

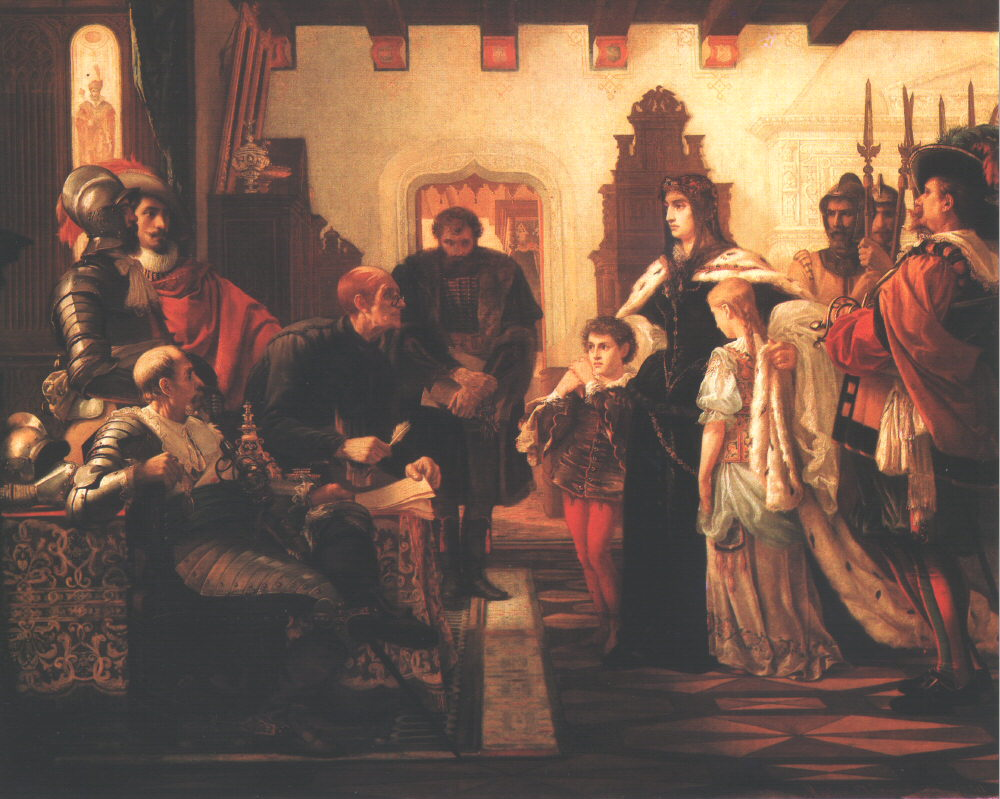
Ilona Zrínyi in the Munkács Castle (Zrínyi Ilona Munkács várában), painted by Victor Madarász

Countess Ilona Zrínyi (Croatian: Jelena Zrinska, Hungarian: Zrínyi Ilona) (1643, Ozalj – 18 February 1703, Izmit) was a noblewoman and heroine. She was one of the last surviving members of the Croatian-Hungarian Zrinski/Zrínyi noble family. She was the daughter of Petar Zrinski, Ban (viceroy) of Croatia, the niece of both Miklós Zrínyi and Fran Krsto Frankopan and the wife of Francis Rákóczi I and Imre Thököly, as well as the mother of Francis Rákóczi II. She is remembered in history for her Defense of Palanok Castle against the Imperial army in 1685-1688, an act for which she was regarded a heroine in Hungary.

== Life ==
=== Early years and family ===
Ilona was born Ilona Zrínyi in Ozalj, present day Croatia. She was the eldest child of Croatian Ban, Petar Zrinski, and his wife Katarina Zrinska née Frankopan, a Croatian poet. Her parents had three other children: two daughters, Judita Petronila (1652-1699), and Aurora Veronika (1658-1735), and a son, Ivan Antun (1651-1703). Ilona and her siblings were the last generation of descendants of the once-powerful Zrinski family.

From her childhood, she was known for her beauty and education. There is little information about her schooling; however, it is known that she acquired a high level of knowledge within her family, not only from her parents, who were Croatian writers and erudite figures but from her uncle, Nikola VII Zrinski.

=== Marriages ===
On 1 March 1666, she married Francis Rákóczi, with whom she had three children: György, born in 1667, who died in infancy; Julianna, born in 1672; and Ferenc, commonly known as Francis Rákóczi II, born in 1676. On June 8, 1676, not long after Francis II's birth, the elder Francis died. The widowed Ilona requested and was granted guardianship of her children, despite the advice of Emperor Leopold I's advisers and contrary to Francis I's will. In this way, she also retained control over the vast Rákóczi estates, which included the castles of Regéc, Sárospatak, Makovica, and Munkács. In 1682 she married Imre Thököly and became an active partner in her second husband's Kuruc uprising against the Habsburgs.

=== Defense of Munkács (Palanok) Castle ===
After their defeat at the Battle of Vienna in 1683, both the Ottoman forces and Thököly's allied Kuruc fighters were forced to retreat, and Thököly quickly lost one Rákóczi castle after another. By the end of 1685, the Imperial army had surrounded the last remaining stronghold, Munkacs Castle, in present day Ukraine. Ilona Zrínyi personally defended the castle for three years from 1685 to 1688 against the forces of General Antonio Caraffa.

=== Internment, exile and death ===
After the recapture of Buda, the situation became untenable, and on 17 January 1688, Ilona was forced to surrender the castle, on the understanding that the defenders would receive amnesty from the Emperor, and that the Rákóczi estates would remain in the names of her children. Under this agreement, she and her children traveled immediately to Vienna, where, in violation of the pact the children were taken from her. Ilona lived until 1691 in the convent of the Ursuline convent, where her daughter Julianna was also raised. Her son Francis was sent immediately the Jesuit school in Neuhaus.

At that time, her husband, Thököly, was still fighting with his Kuruc rebels against the Habsburg army in Upper Hungary. When the Habsburg General Heissler was captured by Thököly, a prisoner exchange was arranged, and Ilona joined her husband in Transylvania. In 1699, however, after the Treaty of Karlowitz was signed, both spouses, having found themselves on the losing side, went into exile in the Ottoman Empire. The countess lived in Galata, a district of Constantinople, and later in Izmit, where she died on 18 February 1703. She was buried in the church of Saint Benoit in Galata.

=== Descendants ===
From her first marriage with Francis Rákóczi, Ilona had three children:

- György (1667–1667)
- Julianna Borbála (September 1672 – 1717); married Count Ferdinand Gobert von Aspremont-Lynden (1643-1708)
- Francis II (27 March 1676 – 8 April 1735)

From her second marriage with Imre Thököly, Ilona had three children, all of whom died at a young age (including one she was pregnant with during the siege of Munkács).

== Legacy ==
Ilona Zrínyi is celebrated in Croatia and Hungary as a national heroine, who opposed, albeit unsuccessfully, the autocratic and absolutism aspirations of the Habsburgs. Her even more famous son Francis II Rákóczi, continued this struggle for the independence of Hungary from 1703 to 1711.

In October 1906 the remains of the Croatian countess were reinterred with her son's in the St Elisabeth Cathedral in present-day Košice, Slovakia.

== Honors ==
- Postage stamp issued by Hungary on 28 September 1952.

== See also ==
- House of Zrinski
- Zrinski family tree
- Zrinski–Frankopan conspiracy
- Kuruc
- Rákóczi's War for Independence
- Wesselényi conspiracy
