= Franz III. Nádasdy =

Hungarian politician

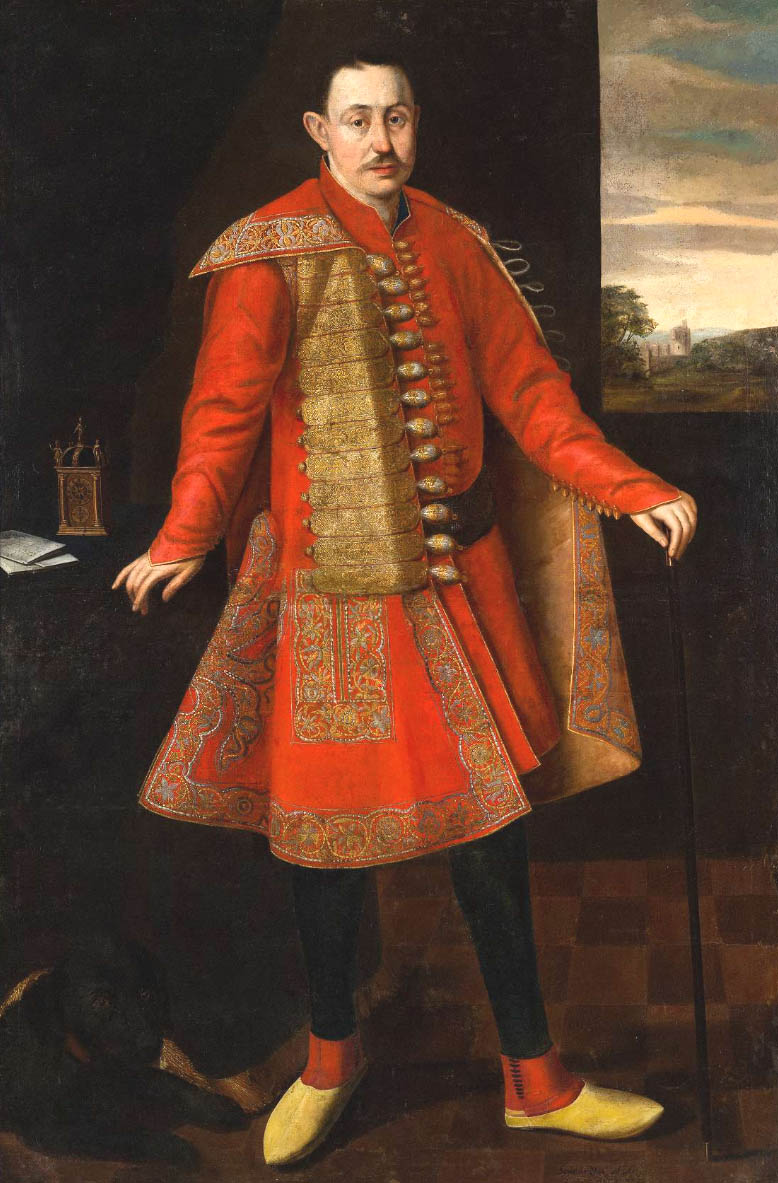
Franz III. Graf Nádasdy in 1656

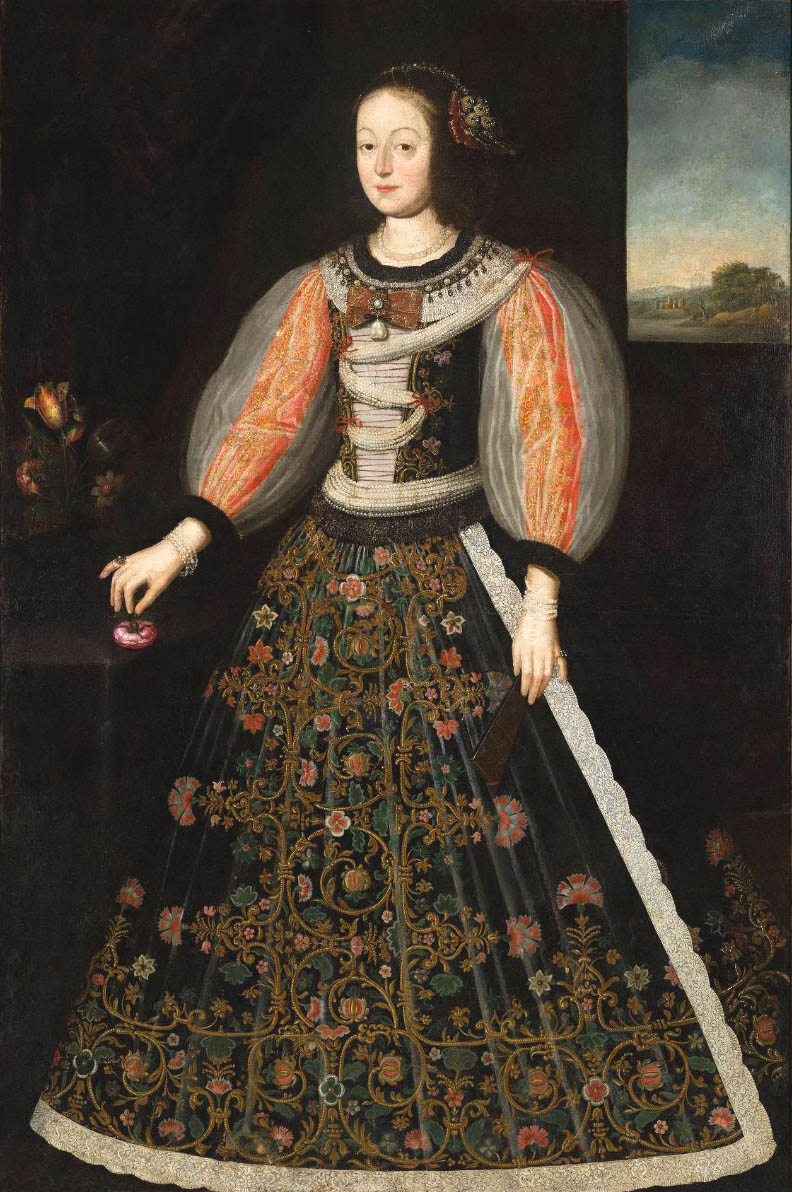
His wife Anna Juliana Esterházy in 1656

Ferenc III. Nádasdy (Hungarian - Nádasdy III. Ferenc; 14 January 1622 – 30 April 1671) was a chief judge and general in Hungary. He was one of the leaders of the Magnate conspiracy against Holy Roman Emperor Leopold I. After the conspiracy was revealed, he and two other leaders (Petar Zrinski and Petar's brother-in-law Fran Krsto Frankopan) were all executed.

== Life ==
He was descended from two royal houses. He was not only descended from a son of Edmund Ironside of England who had settled in Hungary, but was also the grandson of Ferenc Nádasdy. His grandmother Elizabeth Báthory (the infamous Bloody Countess of Csejte Castle) came from the powerful Báthory family.

Nádasdy converted to Roman Catholicism on 25 November 1643 in order to marry Countess Anna Júlia Esterházy (1630–1669), daughter of Nikolaus, Count Esterházy, on 6 February the following year. After the Hungarian Diet in Pressburg decided upon the return of the County of Hornstein to the Kingdom of Hungary, Nádasdy ordered Rudolf von Stotzingen to dismiss his mercenaries.

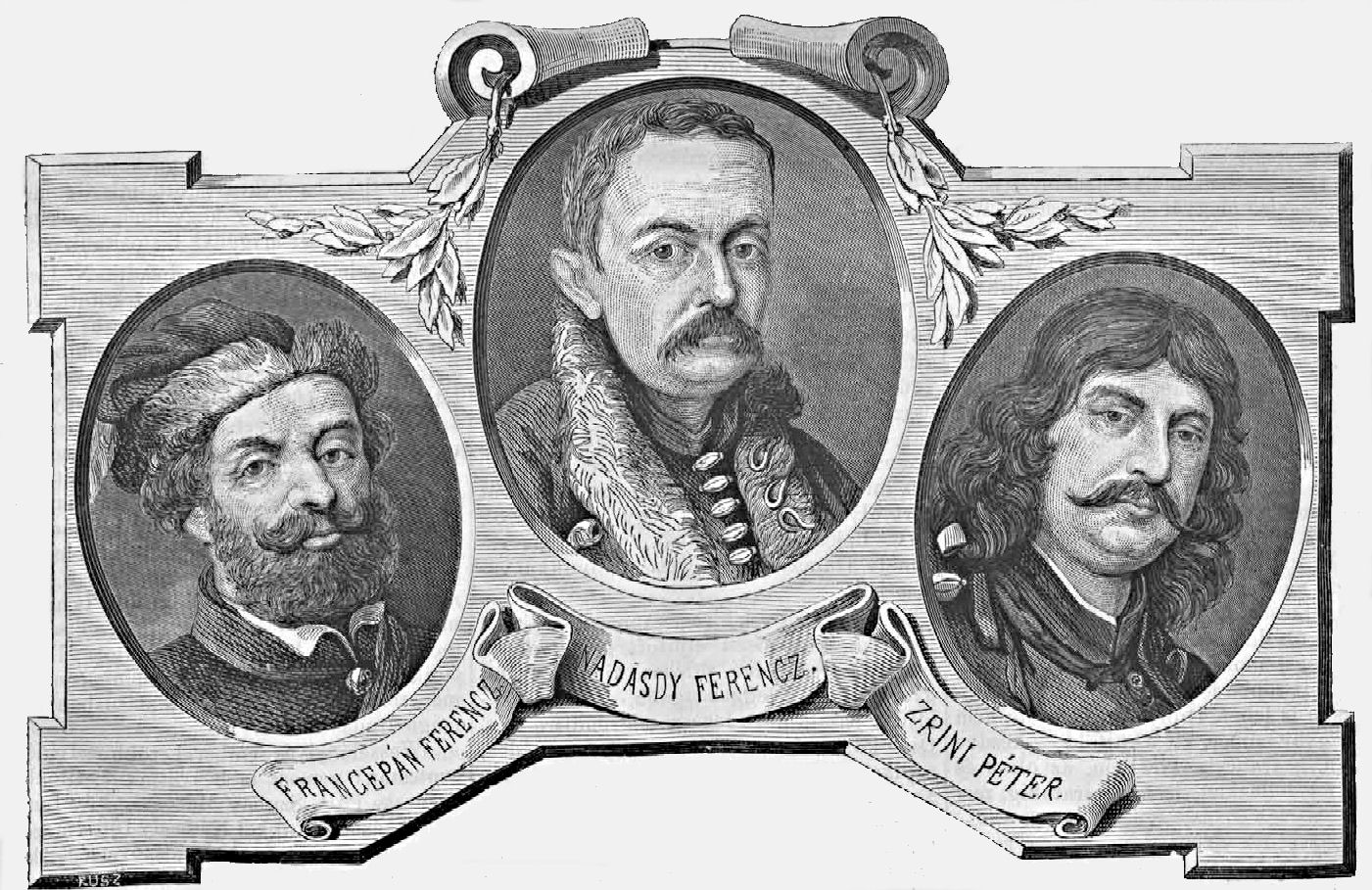
Leaders of the plot

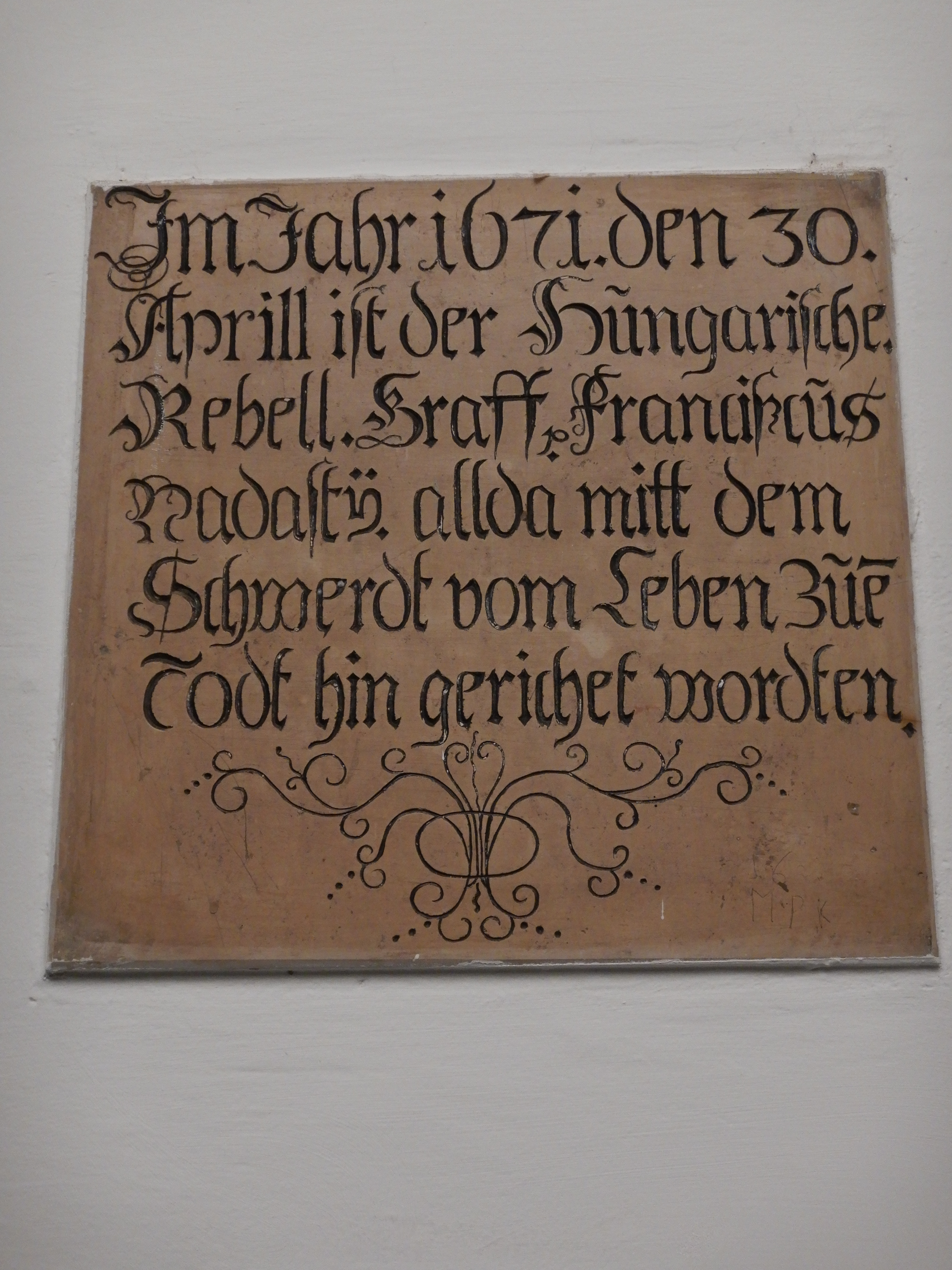
Memorial to Nádasdy in the Altes Rathaus, Vienna, site of his execution

== Bibliography (in German) ==
- Genealogisches Taschenbuch der deutschen gräflichen Häuser aus dem Jahr 1825. Gotha 1825
- Albert Gernot Absenger: Chronik Neufeld III, Verdichtung der gesamten Ortshistorie als Folge- und Erweiterungsband von Lang- und Kurzfassung der 2002 erschienen chronikartigen Darstellung Stadtgemeinde Neufeld an der Leitha, Neufeld an der Leitha 2007.
- Kálmán Benda: Nádasdy, Ferenc Graf, in: Biographisches Lexikon zur Geschichte Südosteuropas. Bd. 3. München 1979, S. 284 f.
