= Ivan Antun Zrinski =

Croatian count

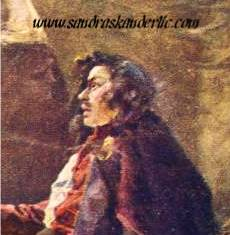
Ivan Antun Zrinski (1654–1703)

Ivan Antun Zrinski (English: John Anthony Zrinski, Hungarian: Zrínyi János Antal), (*Ozalj(?), 1654; †Graz, 11 November 1703) was a Croatian count, a member of the Zrinski noble family and its last male descendant.

== Life ==
By his full name Ivan IV Antun Baltazar Zrinski was the son of Croatian Ban (viceroy) Petar Zrinski (*1621; †1671) and his wife Katarina Zrinski née Frankopan.

He was raised in Prague and gained a high education, having spoken seven foreign languages. During his father's rebellion against the emperor Leopold I (better known as Zrinski-Frankopan conspiracy) because of the infamous Peace of Vasvár, Ivan Antun was still a boy. Yet, he lost all his father's estates and became stigmatized for his whole life.

Although he was loyal to the emperor and fought many battles as a distinguished officer in his army service, Zrinski was permanently spied on and finally accused of high treason and took into custody. He spent twenty years in Austrian dungeons, like Rattenburg in Tyrol and Schloßberg in Graz. At the same time, his older sister Jelena, having been married to the Hungarian nobleman Francis I Rákóczi, fought the emperor's forces in Upper Hungary.

Exhausted, crazy and insane, the count died of pneumonia in Graz on 11 November 1703 and was secretly buried in a tomb under the Dominican monastery. In 1944 his posthumous remains were transferred to the Cathedral of the Assumption of the Blessed Virgin Mary in Zagreb and reburied.
