= Katarina Zrinska =

Croatian noblewoman and poet

Ana Katarina Zrinska
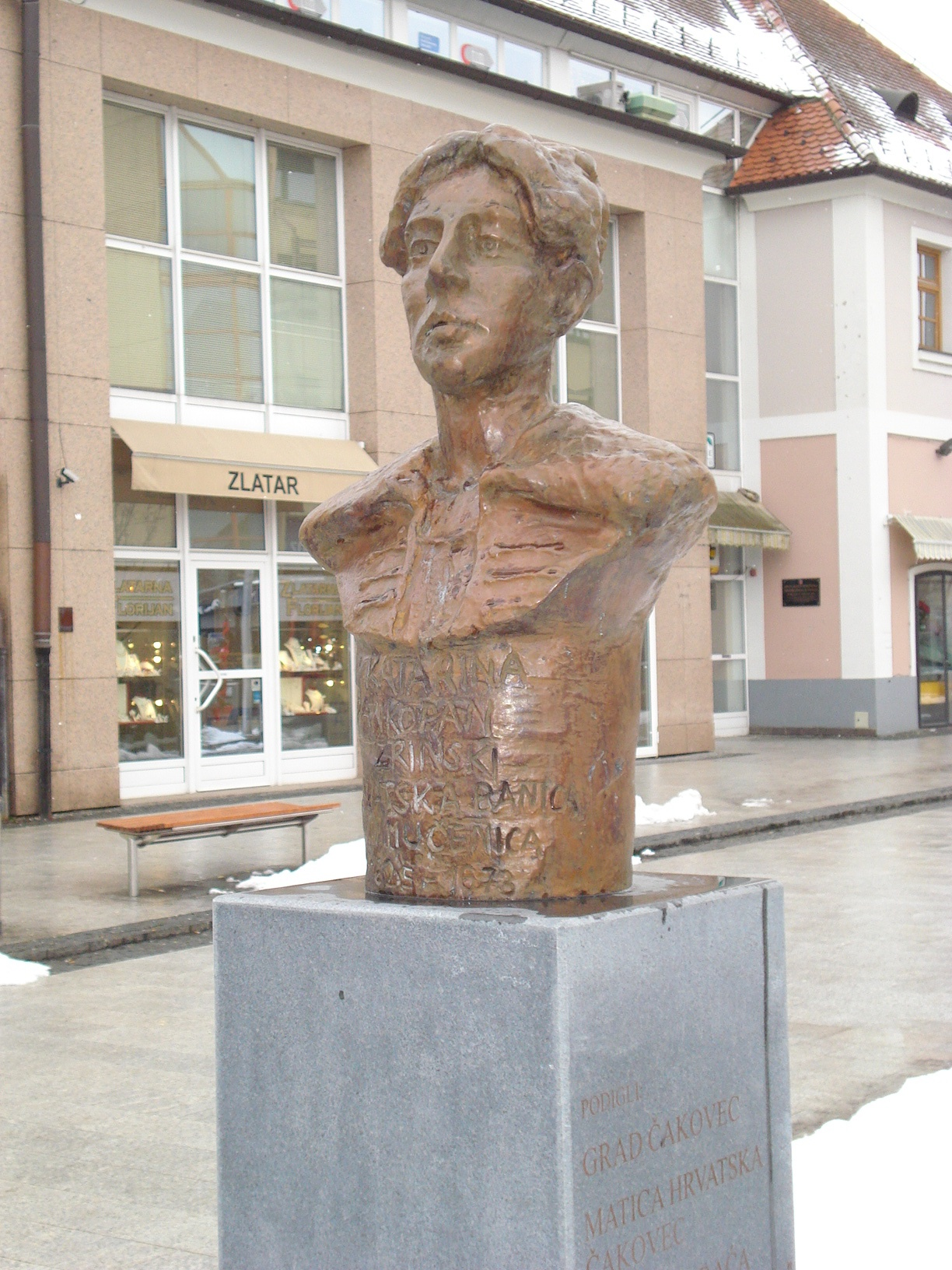
- Bust of Katarina Zrinska in Čakovec
- Born: c. 1625; Bosiljevo, Kingdom of Croatia, Austrian Empire
- Died: 16 November 1673 (aged 47 or 48); Graz, Austrian Empire
- Noble family: House of Frankopan; House of Zrinski
- Spouse: Petar Zrinski
- Issue: Jelena Zrinski (1643–1703); Judita Petronela (1652–1699); Ivan Antun Zrinski (1654–1703); Aurora Veronika (1658–1735)
- Father: Vuk Krsto Frankopan
- Mother: Uršula Innhofer

Countess Ana Katarina Zrinska (c. 1625–1673) was a Croatian noblewoman and poet, born into the House of Frankopan, a Croatian noble family. She married Count Petar Zrinski of the House of Zrinski in 1641 and later became known as Katarina Zrinska. She is remembered in Croatia as a patron of the arts, a writer and patriot. She died in obscurity in a monastery in Graz following the downfall of the Zrinski-Frankopan conspiracy in 1671 and the execution of both her husband Petar Zrinski and her brother Fran Krsto Frankopan. Her most notable literary work is Putni tovaruš, written 1660 at her estates in Ozalj.

Katarina Zrinski and the conspiracy were largely forgotten until the 1860s, when Croatian politician Ante Starčević began a campaign to rehabilitate the Zrinski and Frankopan nobility, and the story of her life and death was widely popularised following the publishing of Eugen Kumičić's historical novel Urota Zrinsko-Frankopanska (English: The Zrinski-Frankopan Conspiracy) in 1893.

In the early 20th century, and especially after World War I, numerous Croatian women's associations were founded bearing her name. In 1999 the Croatian National Bank issued a silver commemorative coin depicting Katarina Zrinski, in their Znamenite Hrvatice (English: Famous Croatian Women) series, along with children's writer Ivana Brlić-Mažuranić and painter Slava Raškaj.

== Biography ==
=== Early life ===
Katarina was born in Bosiljevo in present-day Croatia to Vuk Krsto Frankopan of the Frankopan family, a well-known general and nobleman in the Croatian Military Frontier and his second wife Uršula Inhofer.

She was homeschooled in her youth, and learned German, which was her mother's first language, along with Hungarian, Latin and Italian which she was later taught. In 1641 she married the Croatian nobleman Petar Zrinski in Karlovac, who later went on to become Ban (viceroy) of Croatia following his brother Nikola Zrinski's death in 1664. After marrying Petar the pair spent most of their time at Ozalj Castle, the family residence.

In 1660 she wrote a prayer book titled Putni tovaruš, and had it printed in 1661 in the Republic of Venice before presenting it as a gift to the 17th century Croatian lexicographer Ivan Belostenec (the book was later re-printed in 1687 and 1715 in Ljubljana and then again in 2005 in Čakovec).

=== Children ===
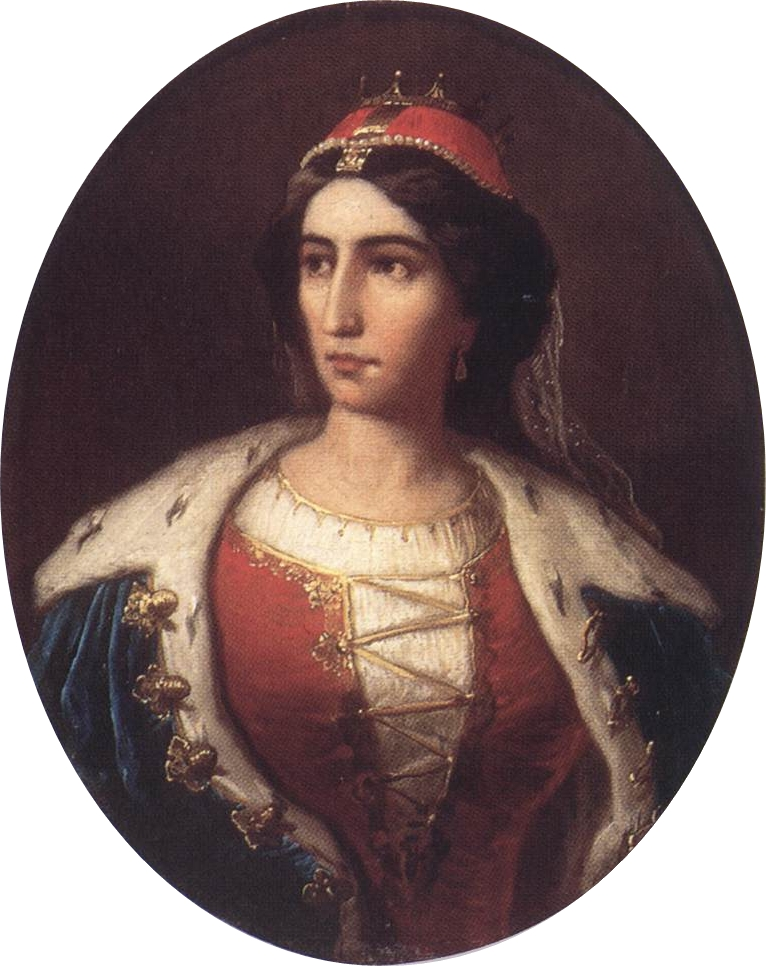
Portrait of Jelena Zrinski

Katarina and Petar had four children, born between 1643 and 1658:

- Jelena Zrinska (1643 – 18 February 1703)
- Judita Petronela (1652–1699)
- Ivan Antun Zrinski (26 August 1654 – 11 November 1703)
- Aurora Veronika (1658 – 19 January 1735)

=== Zrinski-Frankopan conspiracy ===
Following the unpopular Peace of Vasvár treaty signed in 1664 by the Austrian Habsburg monarchy and the Ottoman Empire which gave back parts of the territory which had been liberated from the Turks in the preceding Austro-Turkish War (1663–1664), a conspiracy involving members of the Croatian and Hungarian nobility was formed to overthrow the Habsburgs. The leaders of the conspiracy were Katarina's husband Petar Zrinski, her half brother Fran Krsto Frankopan and the Hungarian count Ferenc Wesselényi. The conspiracy was largely unsuccessful and in March 1670 a crackdown ordered by Leopold I ensued, in which all three men were arrested and imprisoned. On 30 April 1671 both Petar and Fran Krsto were executed in Wiener Neustadt.

The downfall of the conspiracy practically destroyed the House of Zrinski as their enormous property was either confiscated or plundered. Katarina was first arrested and imprisoned in Bruck an der Mur and then ordered into seclusion by the Vienna court. She spent the remaining years of her life in a Dominican convent in Graz with her daughter Aurora Veronika, where she died on 16 November 1673.

== Poetry and writing ==
Her most known work, Putni tovaruš (Travel companion), was a prayer book published in 1660 and mostly translated from German-language prayers. The prose is considered to be of high literary quality and was as such republished multiple times. The language is part of the Ozalj literary circle, using a dialectal mixture of Chakavian, Kajkavian and Shtokavian regiolects. The book was included in the Bibliotheca Zriniana, the private library of Nikola Zrinski, Ban (Viceroy) of Croatia.

There are two poems that can be ascribed to her with absolute certainty, the introductory poem in Putni tovaruš, titled Vsakomu onomu ki bude štal ove knjižice, and a poem contained within a songbook attributed to her under the name Popivka od razboja Čingićevoga, which celebrates her husband's victory over the Ottomans. Literary historians ascribe 30 more poems to her contained within the songbook. Nearly all of them are confessional and self-pitying thematically, and written in feminine first person.

== Legacy ==
=== 1860s–1940s ===
Croatian politician Ante Starčević is considered the first person who initiated a campaign to politically rehabilitate leaders of the conspiracy in the speech he gave on 26 July 1861 in the Croatian Parliament. The speech spurred renewed interest in the whole affair and anniversaries of Petar Zrinski and Fran Krsto Frankopan's deaths started to be commemorated publicly in growing numbers, with increasingly political overtones, as Croatian politicians became vocal in their calls for greater Croatian independence, which was at the time still part of Austria-Hungary. In the 1880s a committee was founded with the purpose of transporting their remains from Wiener Neustadt to Croatia, and in 1893 writer and politician Eugen Kumičić published a historical novel titled The Zrinski-Frankopan Conspiracy, which helped to further popularise the image of Zrinkis and Frankopans as Croatian patriots and martyrs for freedom.

The bones of conspiracy leaders were eventually transferred back to Croatia in 1919 by the Brethren of the Croatian Dragon and were greeted by masses upon their return to Zagreb. By that time Katarina Zrinski also came to be seen as the greatest Croatian woman of the past and a symbol of patriotism for women in Croatia. In the years before World War I, many women's societies sprung up around the country as well as in the Croatian diaspora. The oldest such association bearing Katarina's name was founded in 1914 in Punta Arenas in Chile. It was originally called Hrvatska žena, or Croatian Woman in English, and was primarily interested in keeping the Croatian language alive and helping Croatian women cope with life far from home. However, soon after WWI broke out, the society was actively engaged in helping the Pan-Slavic Yugoslav movement and was thus renamed JNO Katarina Zrinska. In North America the Kćeri Katarine Zrinjske (English: Daughters of Katarina Zrinski) society was formed in 1917 which even had a youth branch in Youngstown, Ohio.

In 1919 the Katarina Zrinjska women's association was formed in Karlovac, the first association bearing her name in Croatia. The society was designed as an organisation of middle class Croatian Catholic women in the area, and they claimed they chose to be named after Katarina because "strictly adhered to Christian principles throughout her life". The proclaimed goal of the society was to "encourage members to be good Catholics, honest citizens, women of significance, model mothers, advanced housekeepers and apostles of all things good", which they hoped to achieve by organising picnics, concerts, education classes, fundraisers, lectures, etc. In 1920 a similar Društvo Hrvatica Katarine grofice Zrinjski was established in Zagreb and in 1930 another one was founded in Petrinja. All these societies were active until the early 1940s, but were eventually disbanded in May 1943 by a decree issued by the fascist government of Independent State of Croatia.

=== 1990s–present ===
The women's societies of the past and their work were largely forgotten during the SFR Yugoslavia period (1945–1990), until the modern-day Zajednica žena Katarina Zrinska, or Community of Women Katarina Zrinska in English, was founded in 1999 in Split, as the centre-right Croatian Democratic Union (HDZ) party's women's branch. Other associations abroad carrying her name include Hrvatska žena – Katarina Zrinska in Adelaide, Australia (est. 1974), HŠKD Croatia Katarina Zrinski in Gothenburg, Sweden, and many others.

Many streets and squares around Croatia are named after her, including the Catherine's Square in the Upper Town part of Zagreb, located next to the Jesuit church of St. Catherine's built between 1620 and 1632 in the baroque style. Many schools and institutions are also named after her.

In 1999 the Croatian National Bank issued a 200 kuna silver commemorative coin with Katarina Zrinski as part of their "Famous Croatian Women" series. In their press release the bank described Katarina as "a writer, ardent patriot and a martyr, as well as a spiritual initiator of the liberation movement against foreign rule".

== See also ==
- Zrinski family tree
