= Putni tovaruš =

1660 prayer book by Katarina Zrinska

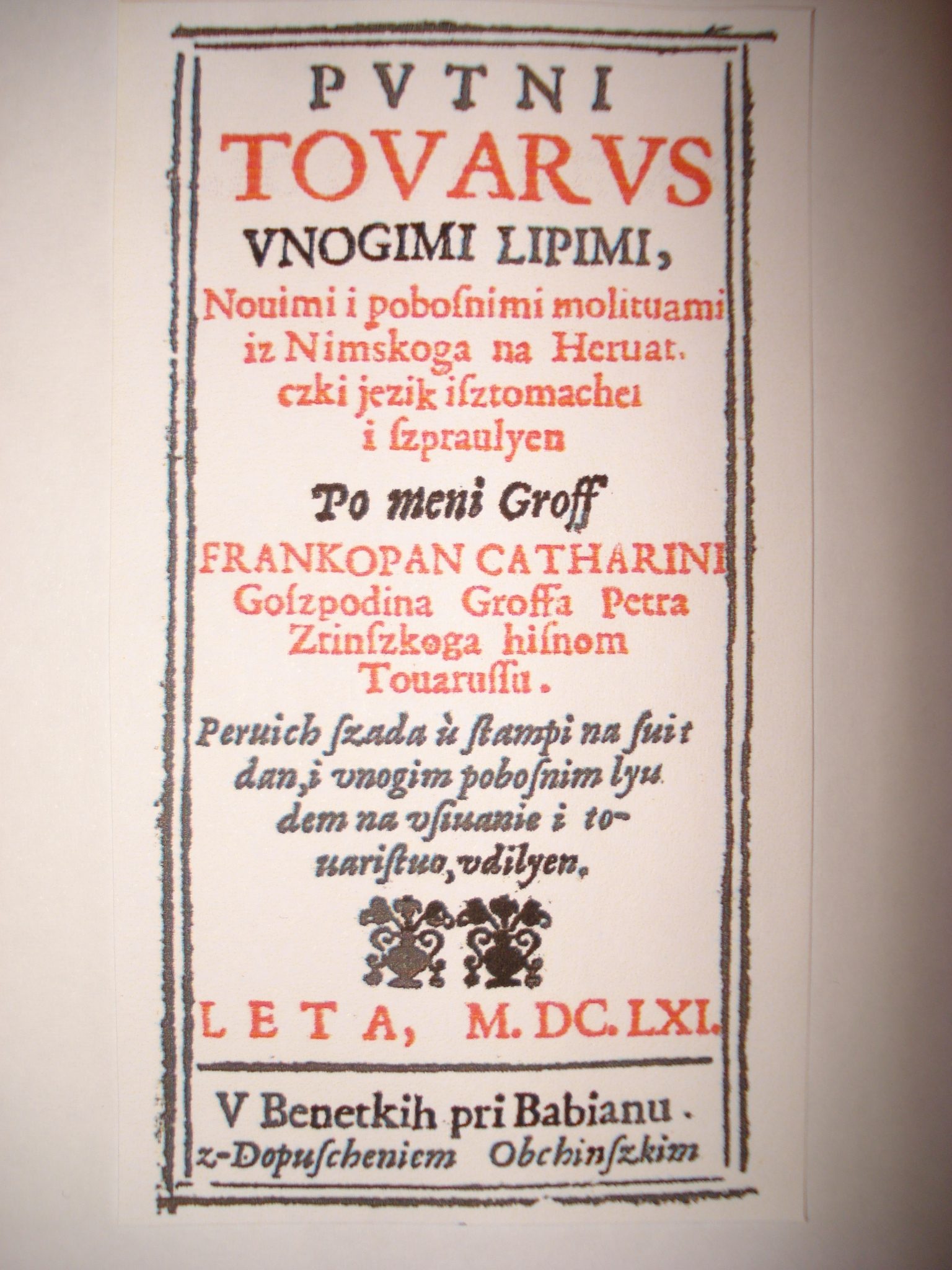
Putni tovaruš

Putni tovaruš (English: Travel companion) is a prayer book written in 1660 by the Croatian poet and noblewoman Katarina Zrinska on her estates in Ozalj. It was first published a year later in Venice.

The book contains poetry by Zrinska, written in the style of Baroque poetry. It also contains prose texts. The language used is a dialectal mixture of Chakavian, Štokavian and Kajkavian, the representative style of the Ozalj literary circle. The book was reprinted twice in Ljubljana, first in 1687 and secondly in 1715.

== Contents and description ==
The book was completed on August 1, 1660 on Katarina Zrinski's estates in Ozalj, as can be seen from the introductory text, and was published in the printing press Babiani in Venice during 1661. In the same foreword titled Vsega hervatckoga i slovinskoga orsaga gospodi i poglavitim ljudem obojega spola (To all noble people of the Croatian and Slavic states of both sexes), Zrinska introduces herself as a enlightened Croatian noblewoman whose work is motivated by her religious convictions and patriotism. This was followed by a skillfully constructed poem Vsakomu onomu, ki štal bude ove knjižice, written in octosyllable, which is reminiscent of high quality Baroque poetry of the 17th century, which further reflect the author's intentions:

Ni za drugo navom svitu
Človik stvoren od ruk Boga,
Kad mu dušu plemenitu
Da srid raja zemaljskoga,
Neg da ovde tako hodi,
Tako živi i putuje,
Da se v smerti prav nahodi
I da v nebu gospoduje.
Zač Bog stvori vnoge staze,
Vnoge pute i načine,
Neg da po njih ljudi plaze
Do nebeske domovine.
Zato knjige, zato pisma,
Zapovidi i zakoni
Poda, da ki ide š njima,
Večnu radost mu nakloni.
...

Most of the prayers of the book were translated from the German language into Croatian, using a dialectal mixture of Chakavian, Štokavian and Kajkavian, as a representative of the Ozalj literary circle. Much of the text is considered to be of high literary quality, which led to its reissues in 1687 and 1715, Ljubljana. According to critic and poet Zvonimir Bartolić, some of the prose texts reach the expressive achievements of poetry, calling the work a jewel in the Croatian baroque literature and one of its most important achievements.

== Example ==
O moj sveti angel čuvar, verni, plemeniti nebeski herceg, hvalim ti serčeno za tvoje čuvanje, pasku i ljubav, koju si ti meni vazdar skazal; preporučam se, tulikajše, tebi ovu noč u tvoju obrambu, i prosim te, dostojaj se po kriposti svetoga križa, od mene odtirati vsu napast i skušnju vražju, da nijednoga stališa pri meni ne najde, nego da ja u svetom miru spati i počivati budem mogal. Po Kristušu Gospodinu našemu. Amen.

— K ANGELU ČUVARU
