= Vladislav Menčetić =

Croatian poet

Vladislav Menčetić or Minčetić (~1617 — 1666) was a Croatian poet and politician from the Republic of Ragusa.

He was schooled in Dubrovnik, and later served as a military commander in Konavle on multiple occasions from 1656 to 1658. In 1637, he saw the zenith of his political career when he entered the Great Council of the Republic of Ragusa. Since 1639, he also served as a lawyer.

Writing during the baroque period, he was a part of the Ragusan nobility which opposed the idea of the Ottoman Empire having supremacy over Dubrovnik. By the end of the Candian war, he assessed such political bond could be severed. This was also reflected in his writing, such as his work Trublja slovinska (The Trumpet of the Slavs), published in Ancona in 1665. The work was dedicated to the Ban of Croatia, Petar Zrinski, whom he highly elevated in his poetic vision, even to the point of ascribing the future liberation of Constantinople to him.

== Works ==
- Trublja slovinska
- Tužba Radmilova cijeć Zorke vile
- Radonja
- Knjiga g. Marojice Kaboge
