= Francis I Rákóczi =

- Elected Prince of Transylvania
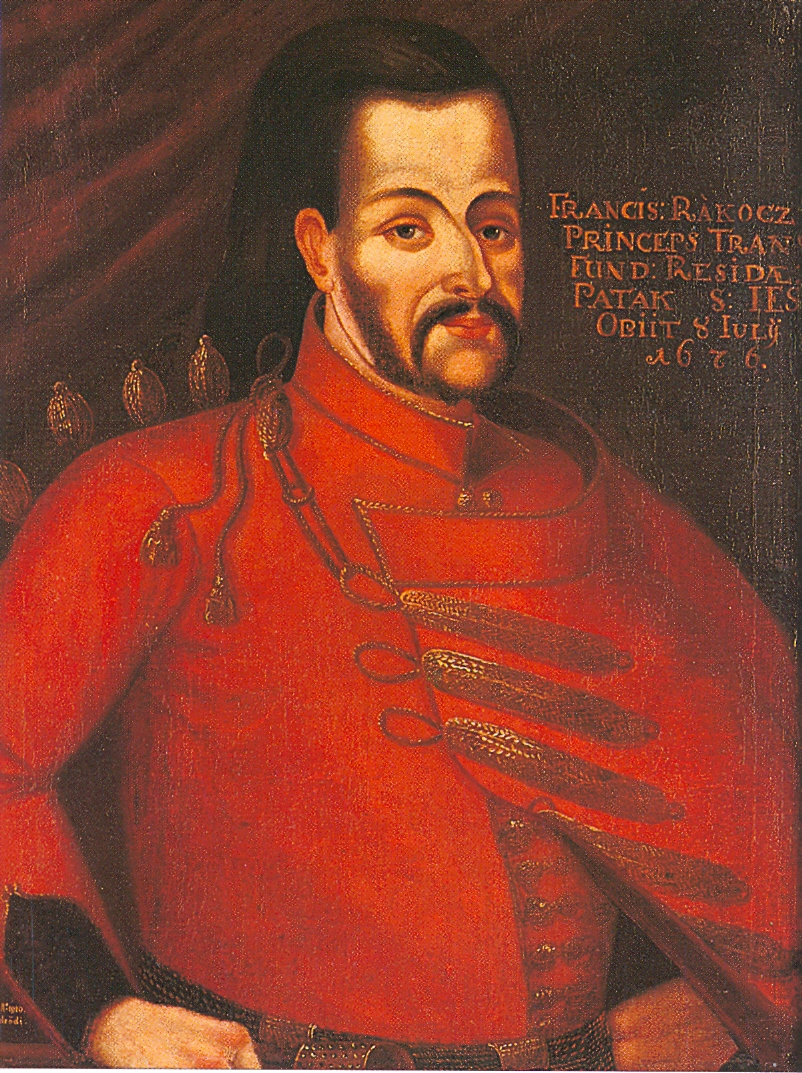
- Francis Rákóczi I, c. 1670
- Born: 24 February 1645; Gyulafehérvár, Principality of Transylvania (today Alba Iulia, Romania)
- Died: 8 July 1676 (aged 31); Zboró, Kingdom of Hungary (today Zborov, Slovakia)
- Spouse: Ilona Zrínyi
- Issue: George Rákóczi; Julianna Rákóczi; Francis II Rákóczi
- House: Rákóczi
- Father: George II Rákóczi
- Mother: Sophia Báthory

Francis I Rákóczi (24 February 1645, Gyulafehérvár, Transylvania – 8 July 1676, Zboró, Royal Hungary) was a Hungarian aristocrat, elected prince of Transylvania and father of Hungarian national hero Francis Rákóczi II.

Francis Rákóczi was the son of George Rákóczi II, prince of Transylvania, and Sophia Báthory. He was elected prince by the Transylvanian Diet in 1652, during his father's life. However, because of the disastrous Polish campaign of 1657 and its consequences, the Ottoman Empire removed his father from the throne in 1660, and prohibited any Rákóczi to ascend the Transylvanian throne. This left Francis unable to come by his father's legacy; he therefore withdrew to his estates in Royal Hungary.

Notably, the Rákóczi family was Calvinist, and they were staunch supporters of the Reformed Church in Hungary. However, Francis' mother, Sophia Báthory, had converted to Calvinism merely for the sake of her marriage. After her husband's death, she returned to Catholicism and supported the Counter Reformation. Francis Rákóczi also became a Catholic, thus acquiring favour with the Catholic Habsburg Court. His mother converted him to Catholicism. He was made a count in 1664.

In 1666 Francis married Jelena Zrinska (Hungarian: Zrínyi Ilona), a Croatian countess, and joined the Wesselényi conspiracy (Zrinski-Frankopan conspiracy in Croatia), one leader of which was Jelena's father, Petar Zrinski (Hungarian: Zrínyi Péter). Francis soon became the leader of the conspiracy, and, as a culmination of their anti-Habsburg stratagems, started an armed uprising of nobles in Upper Hungary, while the other conspirators were supposed to start the fight in Croatia. Due to poor organization and discord between the conspirators, however, the Austrian authorities were well informed; they quickly suppressed the Croatian branch of the revolt.

When Rákóczi learned that Petar Zrinski had been captured by the Austrians, he laid down his arms and applied for mercy. All other leaders of the conspiracy were executed for high treason; Rákóczi, due to his mother's intervention, and for a ransom of 300,000 forints and several castles, was pardoned.

== Issue ==
Francis I had three children:

- György (1667)
- Julianna Borbála (1672–1717), married Count Ferdinand Gobert von Aspremont-Lynden (1643-1708)
- Francis Rákóczi II (1676–1735)

Francis II was born only three months before his father's death. He led a rebellion against Austrian rule (Rákóczi's War of Independence) and died in exile.
