= Magnate conspiracy =

Attempt to oust the Habsburg monarchy from Croatia

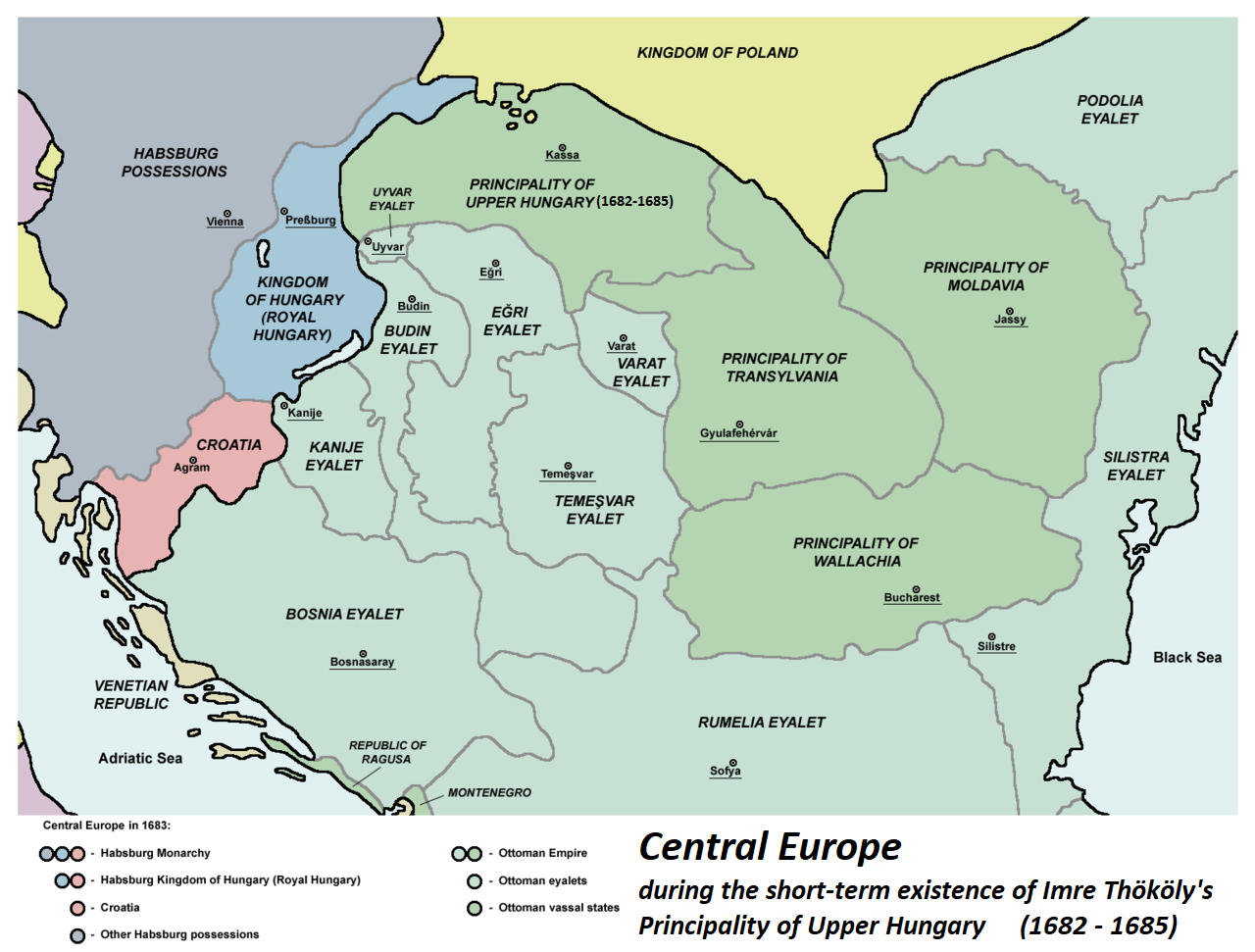
Map of central Europe during the Magnate Conspiracy

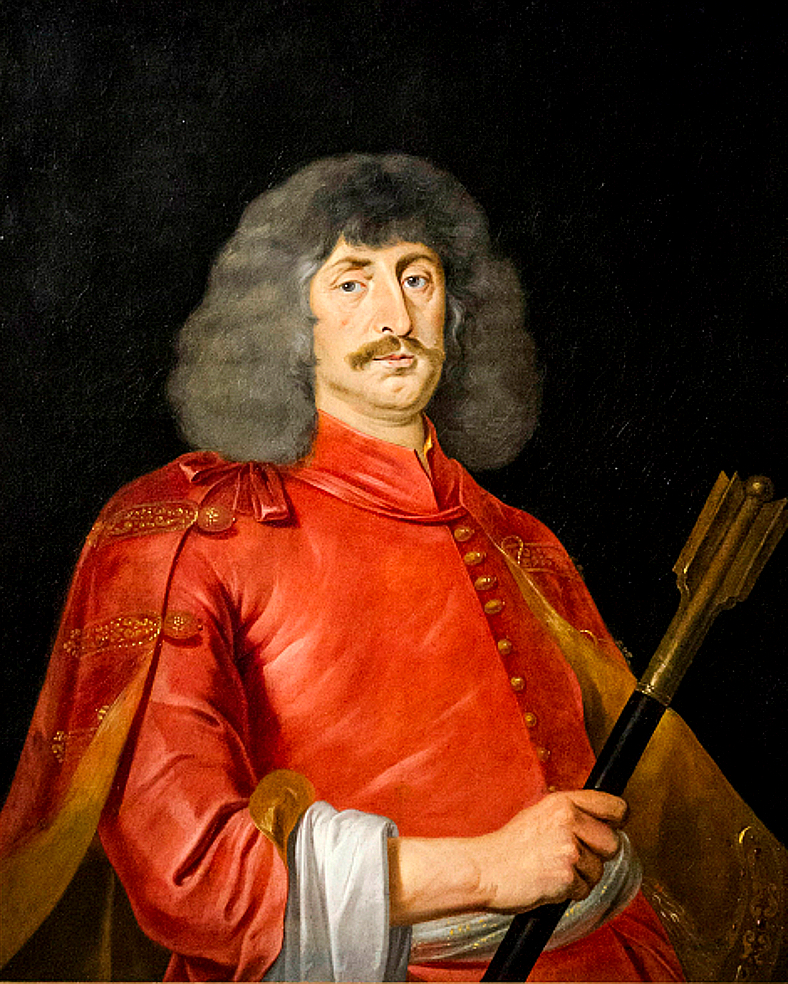
Nikola Zrinski

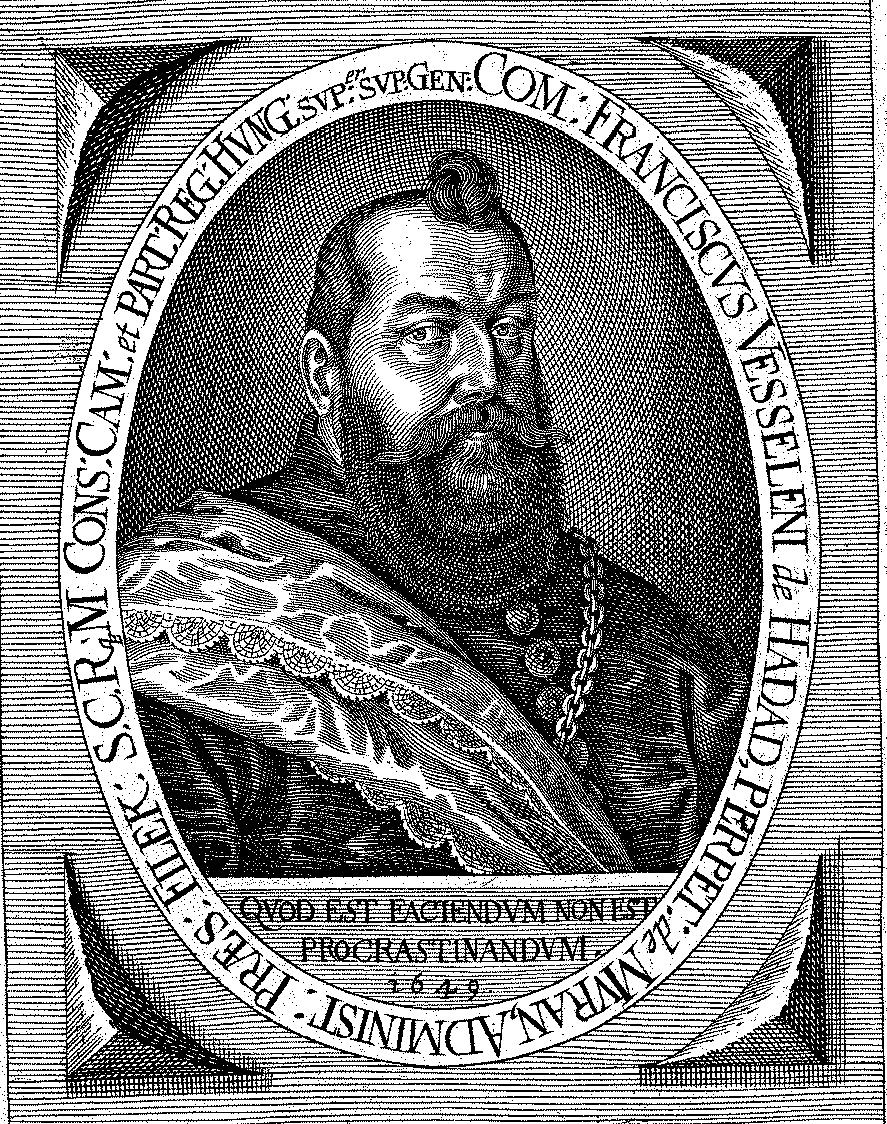
Ferenc Wesselényi

The Magnate Conspiracy (also known as the Zrinski–Frankopan Conspiracy (Croatian: Zrinsko-frankopanska urota) in Croatia, and the Wesselényi Conspiracy (Hungarian: Wesselényi-összeesküvés) in Hungary, was a plot among Croatian and Hungarian nobles to oust the Habsburg Monarchy from Croatia and Hungary, in response to the Treaty of Vasvár in 1664. This treaty – which ended the Fourth Austro-Turkish War – was highly unpopular in the Military Frontier, and those who were involved in the conspiracy intended to reopen hostilities with the Ottoman Empire after they broke away from Habsburg rule.

The attempted coup against Leopold I was led by the Hungarian count Ferenc Wesselényi, the Croatian viceroy Nikola Zrinski, his brother and heir Petar Zrinski, and Petar Zrinski's brother-in-law Fran Krsto Frankopan.

The Zrinski brothers and their associate Fran Krsto Frankopan were motivated, not only by anger over Emperor Leopold's recent peace agreement with the Ottomans, but even more so by his preference for paying more attention to Western Europe while leaving much of Hungary and Croatia under Turkish rule.

Similarly to many other European Governments during the 17th century, the Imperial Court was increasingly centralising the administration of the state so they could introduce a more consistent policy of both mercantilism and absolute monarchy. Similarly to 16th- and 17th-century France, the main obstacle towards a more centralized government was the military and political power and de facto independence of the wealthiest nobles. Instead of succeeding, the Magnate's poorly organized attempt at a regime change revolt and their extremely foolhardy decision to seek Ottoman backing, while at the same time planning to later recapture much more of Croatia and Hungary from rule by both Sharia Law and the House of Osman, caused the Magnate's plans to be leaked to Emperor Leopold and caused the monarch to order a political purge and execute the conspiracy's leaders for high treason.

== Causes ==
The expansion of the Ottoman Empire into Europe began in the second half of the 14th century leading to confrontation with both Serbia and the Byzantine Empire and culminating in the defeat of both nations in, respectively, the Battle of Kosovo (1389) and the Fall of Constantinople (1453). The expansionist policy eventually brought them into conflict with the Habsburgs a number of times during the 16th and 17th centuries. After the 1526 Battle of Mohács, the middle part of the Kingdom of Hungary was conquered; by the end of the 16th century, it was split into what has become known as the Tripartite: the Habsburg-ruled Royal Hungary to the north, the Ottoman-ruled pashaluk to the south, and Transylvania to the east. A difficult balancing act played itself out as supporters of the Habsburgs battled supporters of the Ottomans in a series of civil wars and wars of independence.

By September 1656, the stalemate between the two great powers of Eastern Europe began to shift as the Ottoman Sultan Mehmed IV with the aid of his Grand Vizier Köprülü Mehmed Pasha set out to reform the Ottoman military. The changes allowed the Sultan to invade and conquer the Transylvanian-held areas of Hungary in May 1660. The ensuing battles killed the Transylvanian ruler George II Rákóczi. Following a fairly easy victory against him, the Ottomans continued to occupy more and more of Transylvania and approached the borders of Royal Hungary.

The invasion of the Transylvanian state upset the balance in the region, and precipitated the involvement of many external actors. The Teutonic Order had been expelled from Transylvania in 1225 and since then had been put under the sovereignty of the Pope in Rome, and had thus not been under the sovereignty of the Holy Crown of Hungary for many centuries. The Teutonic Grandmaster Leopold Wilhelm attempted in 1660 to once again allow the Teutonic Knights to obtain an important role in Hungary through involvement in the supreme command of the Military Frontier, the defensive borderlands between the Habsburg and Ottoman domains.

These moves drew in Habsburg forces under Leopold I. Although initially reluctant to commit forces and cause an outright war with the Ottomans, he had by 1661 sent some 15,000 of his soldiers under his field marshal Raimondo Montecuccoli. Despite this intervention, the Ottoman invasion of Transylvania continued unabated. In response, by 1662 Montecuccoli had been given another 15,000 soldiers and had taken up positions in Hungary to stop the Turkish advance. Adding to his forces was an army of native Croats and Hungarians led by the Croatian noble Nikola Zrinski. Montecuccoli also had additional German support thanks to the diplomatic efforts of the Hungarian magnate Ferenc Wesselényi. This became important, especially because it showed that Hungarian leaders, without direct Habsburg involvement and perhaps backed up by France, could hold their own diplomacy in Rome. Eventually, the Teutonic Order would also send between 500 and 1000 elite knights to Hungary in support of the Imperial armies against the Ottomans.

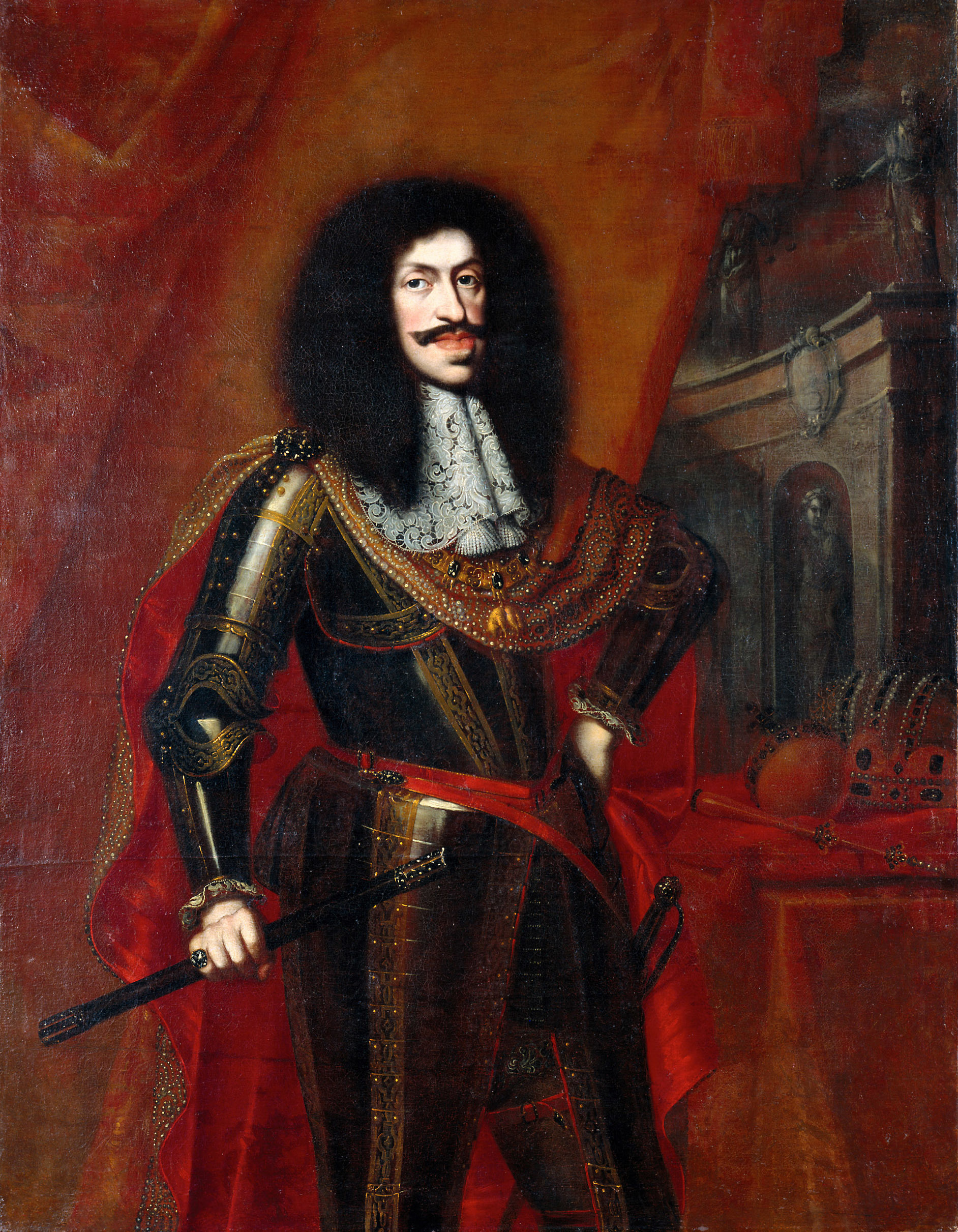
Leopold I, Holy Roman Emperor and Archduke of Austria from 1657–1705

By late 1663 and early 1664, the coalition had not only taken back Ottoman-conquered land but also cut off Ottoman supply lines and captured several Ottoman-held fortresses within Hungary. In the meantime, a large Ottoman army, led by the Grand Vizier Köprülü Fazıl Ahmed Pasha and numbering up to 100,000 men, was moving from Constantinople to the northwest. In June 1664, it attacked Novi Zrin Castle in Međimurje County (northern Croatia) and conquered it after one-month-long siege. However, on August 1, 1664, the combined Christian armies of Germany, France, Hungary and the Habsburgs won a decisive victory against the Ottomans in the Battle of Saint Gotthard. Members of the Order of the Golden Fleece and the Teutonic Order distinguished themselves in the battle, and the new Teutonic Grandmaster Johann Caspar von Ampringen would later be made the Imperial governor of Hungary in 1673 for his role in the victory.

Following the Ottoman defeat, many Hungarians had assumed that the combined forces would continue their offensive to remove all Ottomans from Hungarian lands. However, Leopold was more concerned with events unfolding in Habsburg Spain and the brewing conflict that would come to be known as the War of the Spanish Succession. Leopold saw no need to continue combat on his eastern front when he could return the region to balance and concentrate on potential conflict with France over the rights to the Spanish throne. Moreover, the Ottomans could have committed more troops within a year, and a prolonged struggle with the Ottomans was risky for Leopold. To end the Ottoman issue quickly, he signed what has come to be known as the Peace of Vasvár.

Despite the common victory, the treaty was largely a gain for the Ottomans. Its text, which inflamed Hungary's nobles, stated that the Habsburgs would recognize the Ottoman-controlled Michael I Apafi as ruler of Transylvania and that Leopold would pay a final gift of 200,000 gold florins to the Ottomans to secure a 20-year truce. While Leopold could concentrate on the issues in Spain, the Hungarians remained divided between two empires. Moreover, many Hungarian magnates were left feeling as if the Habsburgs had pushed them aside at their one opportunity for independence and security from Ottoman advances.

== Unfolding ==
One of the primary leaders of the conspiracy was Nikola Zrinski, the Croatian ban who had led the native forces alongside the Habsburg commander Montecuccoli. By then, Zrinski had begun to plan a Hungary free of outside influence and with a population protected by the state rather than used by it. He hoped to create a united army with Croatian and Transylvanian support to free Hungary. However, he died within months during a struggle with a wild boar on a hunting trip; this left the revolt in the hands of Nikola Zrinski's younger brother Petar as well as Ferenc Wesselényi.

The conspirators hoped to gain foreign aid in their attempts to free Hungary and even overthrow the Habsburgs. The conspirators entered into secret negotiations with a number of nations, including France, Sweden, the Polish–Lithuanian Commonwealth and the Republic of Venice, in an attempt to gain support. Wesselényi and his fellow magnates even made overtures to the Ottomans offering all of Hungary in return for the semblance of self-rule after the Habsburgs had been removed, but no state wanted to intervene. The Sultan, like Leopold, had no interest in renewed conflict; in fact, his court informed Leopold of the attempts being made by the conspirators in 1666.

While the warnings from the Sultan's court cemented the matter, Leopold already suspected the conspiracy. The Austrians had informants inside the group of nobles and had heard from several sources of their wide-ranging and almost desperate attempts to gain foreign and domestic aid. However, no action was taken because the conspirators had made little traction and were bound by inaction. Leopold seems to have considered their actions as only half-hearted schemes that were never truly serious. The conspirators invented a number of plots that they never carried out such as the November 1667 plot to kidnap Emperor Leopold, which failed to materialize.

After yet another failed attempt for foreign aid from the pasha of Buda, Zrinski and several other conspirators turned themselves in. However, Leopold was content to grant them freedom to gain support from the Hungarian people. No action was taken until 1670, when the remaining conspirators began circulating pamphlets inciting violence against the Emperor and calling for invasion by the Ottoman Empire. They also called for an uprising of the Protestant minority within Royal Hungary. When the conspiracy's ideals began to gain some support within Hungary, the official reaction was swift.

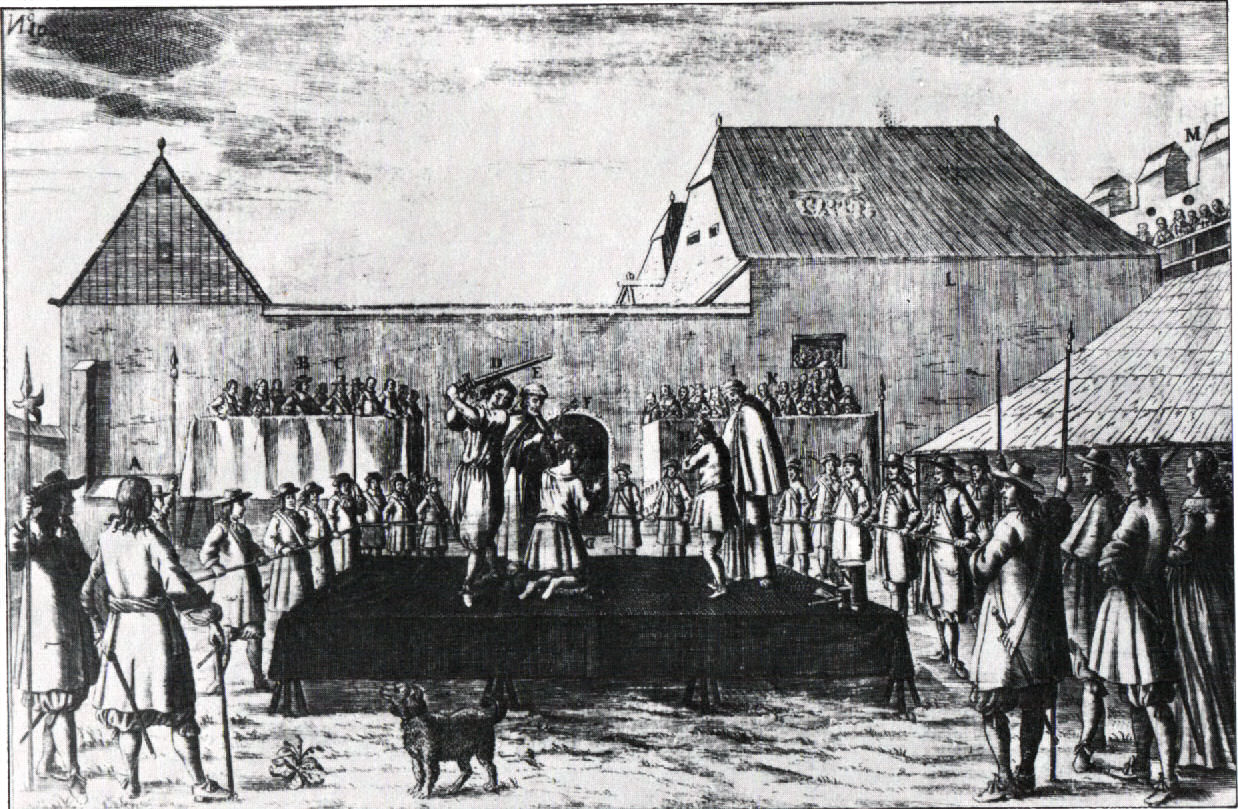
Beheading of Zrinski and Frankopan in Wiener Neustadt

In March 1671, the leaders of the group, including Petar Zrinski, Fran Krsto Frankopan and Franz III. Nádasdy, were arrested and executed; some 2,000 nobles were arrested as part of a mass crackdown (many of the lesser nobles had had no part in the events, but Leopold aimed to prevent similar revolts in the future).

Persecution was also inflicted on Hungarian and Croatian commoners, as Habsburg soldiers moved in and secured the region. Protestant churches were burned to the ground in a show of force against any uprisings. Leopold ordered all Hungarian organic laws suspended in retaliation for the conspiracy. That gesture caused an end to the self-government which Royal Hungary had nominally been granted, which remained unchanged for the next 10 years. In Croatia, where Petar Zrinski had been a ban (viceroy) during the conspiracy, there would not be any new bans of Croatian origin for the next 60 years.

== Aftermath ==
Petar Zrinski and Fran Krsto Frankopan (Francesco Cristoforo Frangipani) were ordered to the Emperor's Court. The note said that, as they had ceased their rebellion and had repented soon enough, they would be given mercy from the Emperor if they would plead for it. They were arrested the moment they arrived in Vienna, and put on trial. They were held in Wiener Neustadt and beheaded on April 30, 1671. Nádasdy was executed on the same day, and Tattenbach was executed later on December 1, 1671.

The conspirators were first tried by the Emperor's court; after the verdict, however, they requested the exercise of their right—as nobles—to be tried by a court of their peers. Another court was assembled, of nobility from parts of the empire far from Croatia or Hungary, which also accepted the previous fatal verdict. Petar Zrinski's verdict read that he "[...] committed a greater sin than the others in aspiring to obtain the same station as His Majesty, that is, to be an independent Croatian ruler, and therefore he indeed deserves to be crowned not with a crown, but with a bloody sword."

During the trial and after the execution, the conspirators' estates were pillaged, and their families scattered. The destruction of these powerful feudal families ensured that no similar event took place until the bourgeois era. Petar's wife (Katarina Zrinska) and two of their daughters died in convents, and his son, Ivan, died mad after a terrible imprisonment and torture. Katarina published the last letter her husband had sent to her, as a motivation to end the war with the Ottomans.

The bones of Zrinski and Frankopan (Frangipani) remained in Austria for 248 years, and it was only after the fall of the monarchy that their remains were moved to the crypt of Zagreb Cathedral.

=== Legacy in Hungary ===
Leopold I appointed a Directorium to administer Hungary in 1673, led by the Teutonic Order Grand Master Johann Caspar von Ampringen, which replaced the Palatine of Hungary. The new government pursued a harsh crackdown against disloyal nobles and the Protestant movement. In order to combat the perceived threat from Hungary's Protestants against the Roman Catholics in his lands, Leopold ordered some 60,000 forced conversions in the first two years of his reprisals for the conspiracy. In addition, 800 Protestant churches were closed down. By 1675, 41 Protestant pastors would be publicly executed after having been found guilty of inciting riots and revolts.

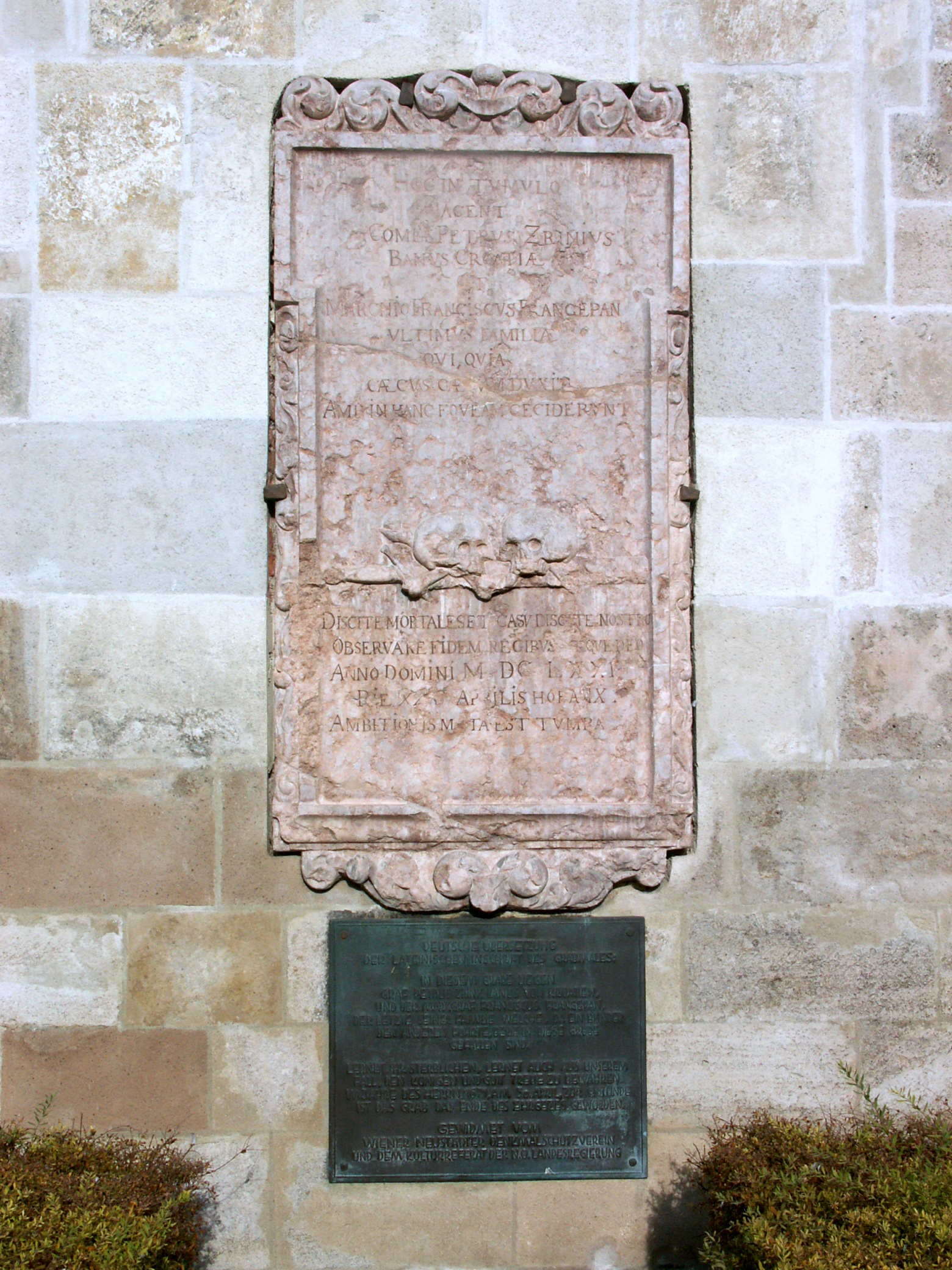
Zrinski-Frankopan tombstone on the Cathedral in Wiener Neustadt

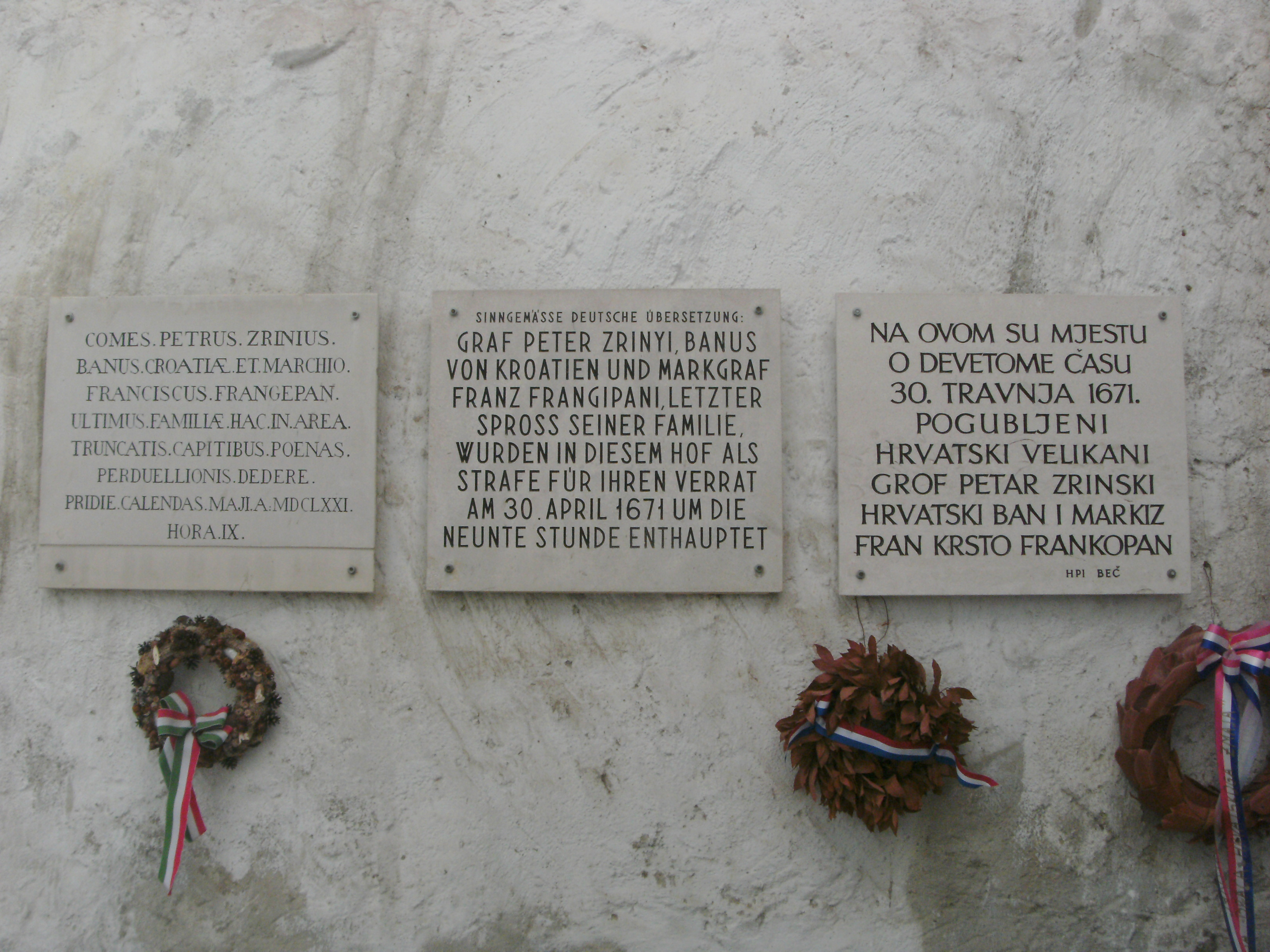
Memorial plaques in honour of Frankopan and Zrinski written in Latin, German and Croatian in Wiener Neustadt

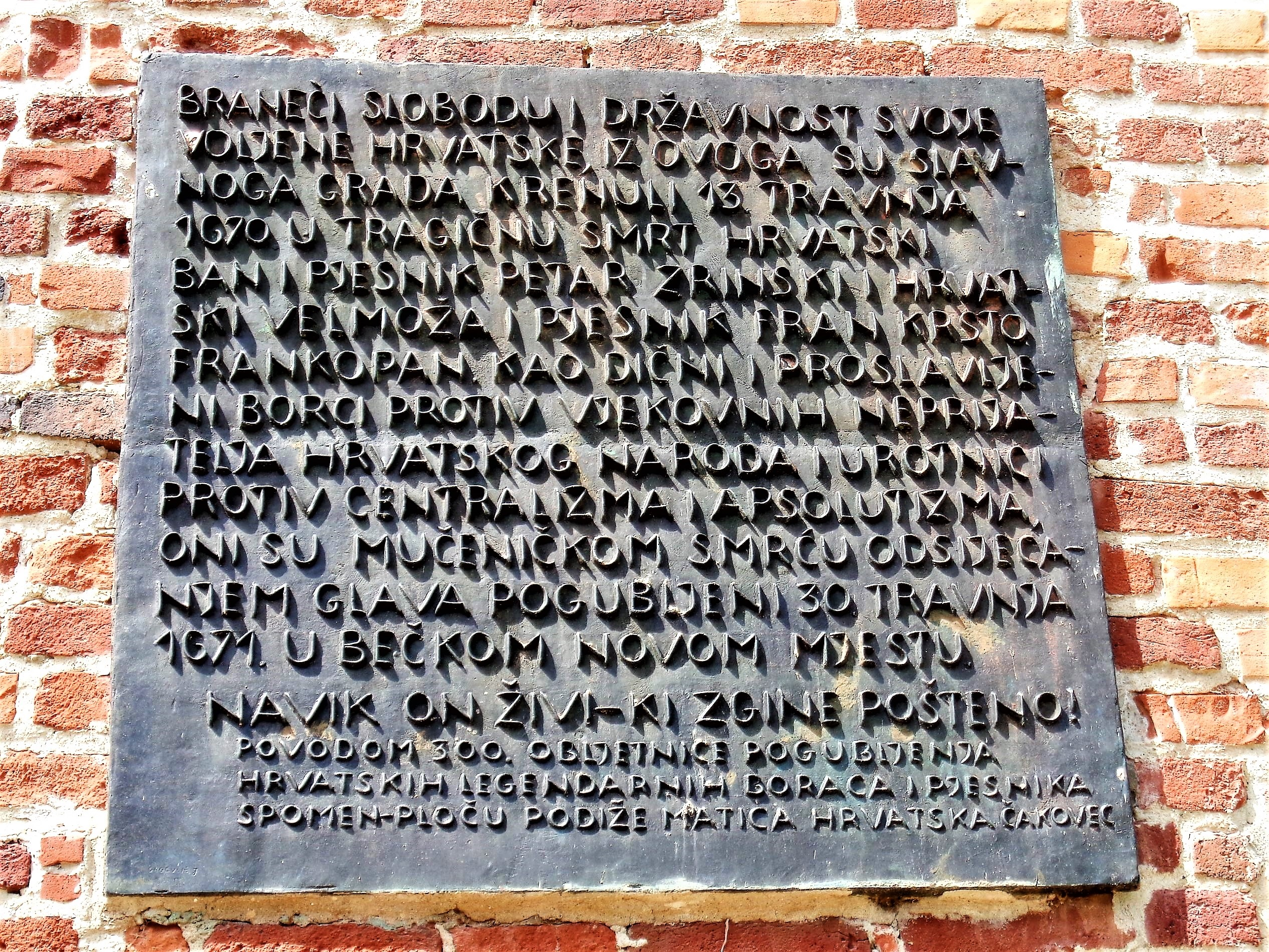
Memorial plaque at the entrance of the Zrinski Castle in Čakovec, Croatia

The crackdown caused a number of former soldiers and other Hungarian nationals to rise up against the state in a sort of guerilla warfare. These kuruc ("crusaders") began launching raids on the Habsburg army stationed within Hungary. For years after the crackdown, kuruc rebels would gather en masse to combat the Habsburgs; their forces' numbers swelled to 15,000 by the summer of 1672.

Kuruc forces were far more successful than the conspiracy, and remained active against the Habsburgs up until 1711; they were also more successful in convincing foreign governments of their ability to succeed. Foreign aid came first from Transylvania (which was under Ottoman suzerainty) and later by the Ottoman Empire. This foreign recognition would eventually lead to a large-scale invasion of Habsburg domains by the Ottoman Empire and the Battle of Vienna in 1683.

=== Legacy in Croatia ===
The Ottoman conquests reduced Croatia's territory to only 16,800 km^{2} by 1592. The Pope referred to the country as the "remnants of the remnants of the Croatian kingdom" (Latin: reliquiae reliquiarum regni Croatiae) and this description became a battle cry of the affected nobles. This loss was a death warrant for most Croatian noble families, which had voted in 1526 for the Habsburgs to rule in Croatia. Without any territory to control, they eventually became a historical footnote. Only the Zrinski and Frankopan families stayed powerful, because their possessions were in the unconquered, western part of Croatia. At the time of the conspiracy, they controlled around 35% of civilian Croatia (another third of Croatian territory was under the emperor's direct control, as the Military Frontier). After the conspiracy failed, these lands were confiscated by the emperor, who could grant them upon his discretion. Nothing better shows the situation in Croatia after the conspiracy than the fact that between 1527 - 1670 there were 13 bans (viceroys) of Croatia of Croatian origin—but between 1670 and the revolution of 1848, there would be only 2 bans of Croatian nationality. The period from 1670 to the Croatian cultural revival in the 19th century was Croatia's political dark age. From the Zrinski-Frankopan conspiracy until the French Revolutionary Wars in 1797, no soldiers were recruited from Istria, where in the 17th century a total of 3,000 soldiers had been recruited.

== Conspirators ==
The leaders of the conspiracy were initially Ban of Croatia Nikola Zrinski (viceroy of Croatia) and Hungarian palatine Ferenc Wesselényi (viceroy of Hungary). The conspirators were soon joined by dissatisfied members of the noble families from Croatia and Hungary, like Nikola's brother Petar (appointed Ban of Croatia after Nikola's death), Petar's brother-in-law Fran Krsto Frankopan, elected Prince of Transylvania and Petar's son-in-law Francis I Rákóczi, high justice of the Court of Hungary Franz III. Nádasdy and Esztergom archbishop (the Primate of Hungary) György Lippay. The conspiracy and rebellion was entirely led by nobility. Nikola Zrinski, György Lippay and Ferenc Wesselényi died before the conspiracy was revealed. The remaining leaders Petar Zrinski, Fran Krsto Frankopan and Franz III. Nádasdy were all executed in 1671. Francis I Rákóczi was the only leading conspirator whose life was spared, due to his mother Sophia Báthory's intervention and a ransom payment.
