= Petar Zrinski =

Croatian military commander and writer

Petar Zrinski Peter IV Zrinski Zrínyi Péter
- Ban of Croatia
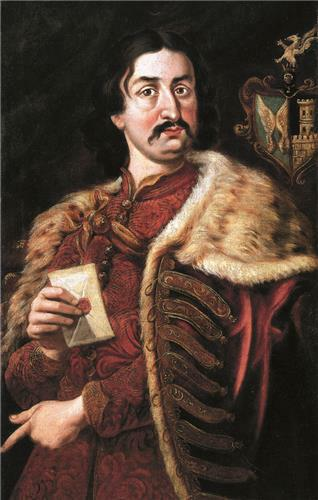

Ban of Croatia
- Reign: 24 January 1665 – 29 March 1670
- Predecessor: Nikola Zrinski
- Successor: Miklós Erdődy
- Born: 6 June 1621; Vrbovec, Kingdom of Croatia (modern Croatia)
- Died: 30 April 1671 (aged 49); Wiener Neustadt, Archduchy of Austria (modern Austria)
- Buried: Zagreb Cathedral, Croatia
- Noble family: House of Zrinski
- Spouse: Katarina Zrinska
- Issue: Jelena Zrinska; Ivan Antun Zrinski; Judita Petronila; Zora Veronika
- Father: Juraj V Zrinski, Ban of Croatia
- Mother: Magdalena Zrinska (born Széchy)

Petar IV Zrinski (Hungarian: Zrínyi Péter) (6 June 1621 – 30 April 1671) was Ban of Croatia (Viceroy) from 1665 to 1670, general and a writer. A member of the Zrinski noble family, he was noted for his role in the attempted Croatian-Hungarian Magnate conspiracy to overthrow the Habsburgs, which ultimately led to his execution for high treason.

== Zrinski family ==
Petar Zrinski was born in Vrbovec, a small town near Zagreb, the son of Juraj V Zrinski and Magdalena Széchy. His father Juraj VI and great-grandfather Nikola IV had been viceroys or Ban of Croatia, which was then a nominal Kingdom in personal union with the Hungarian Kingdom. His brother was the Croatian general and poet Nikola VII Zrinski.

His family had possessed large estates throughout all of Croatia and had family ties with the second largest Croatian landowners, the Frankopan family. He married Ana Katarina, the half-sister of Fran Krsto Frankopan, and they lived in large castles of Ozalj (in Central Croatia) and Čakovec in Međimurje, northernmost county of Croatia. Through his daughter, Jelena Zrinska, he was the grandfather of famed Hungarian general Francis II Rákóczi.

== Military career ==
He was initially schooled abroad in Graz and Trnava, and later also studied military science in Italy. Upon his return in 1637, he clashed with the Ottomans near Nagykanizsa. Since then he resided in Ozalj, where he married Ana Katarina Frankapan. Due to forceful seizure of a land parcel near Rijeka, he was accused of treason, but was later pardoned in 1647. He was appointed a great captain of Žumberak uskoks, with whom he participated in the Thirty Years' War, in which he distinguished himself during its final phase on the German and Bohemian frontiers.

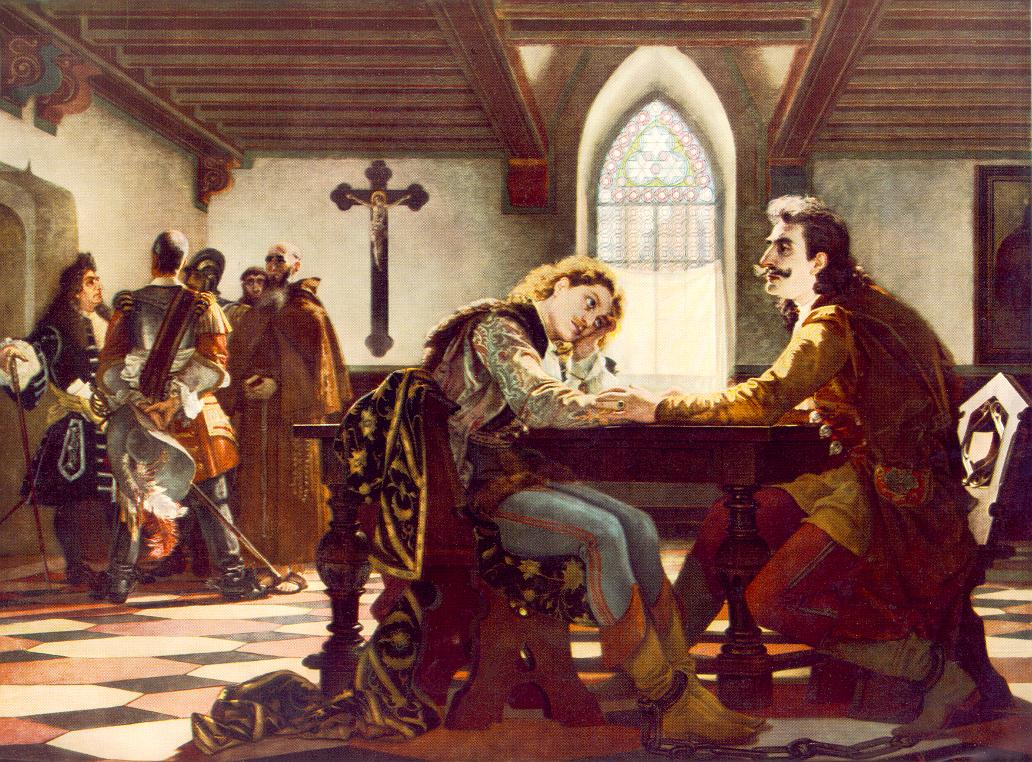
Petar Zrinski (right) and Fran Krsto Frankopan (left), by Viktor Madarász

In 1649, he defeated an Ottoman army near Slunj, and in 1654, he aided the Republic of Venice both on land and on sea in the Candian War, causing great damage to the Ottomans. In 1655, he again defeated an Ottoman army near Perušić in Lika, which earned him the position of captain of Senj, Ogulin and whole of Primorje (coastline).

On 16 October 1663, he achieved his greatest victory against the Ottomans, in a place called Jurjeve Stjene (George's cliffs), near Otočac, where he defeated a much greater Ottoman army numbering 8,000-10,000 troops under the command of Ali-Pasha Čengić, who was consequently captured by the Croatian army. As a result, the entire army of the Bosnia Eyalet was defeated, and invasions into Gacka from there permanently ceased. In spite of this success, the ransom for Čengić was taken away from him upon the complaint of general Herbert Auersperg, who previously withdrew to Carniola from Karlovac.

== Other endeavors ==
The first large-scale manufacturing of iron-based goods on Croatian soil was established by Petar IV Zrinski on his estates in Čabar, where he built a smelting furnace, foundry and forge in 1651. The ironworks facility employed hundreds of artisans and serfs producing goods such as nails, swords and plows, as well as other tools for various fields, and was in operation until the late 18th century. The iron products produced there were then transported all across the land, but were also exported through the Zrinski-controlled port in Bakar. In Bakar, a warehouse had also been built for this purpose. In one such example, the goods were traded for salt with the merchants from Naples.

== Zrinski-Frankopan plot ==
During the Austro–Turkish War (1663–1664) Petar Zrinski fought the Turks at the siege of Novi Zrin Castle along with his brother Nikola. After the unpopular Peace of Vasvár (1664) between Holy Roman Emperor Leopold I and the Ottoman Empire, he joined Croatian and Hungarian nobility who were disappointed by the failure to remove the Ottomans completely from Hungarian territory and embarked on a conspiracy to remove foreign influence, including Habsburg rule, from the Lands of the Crown of St. Stephen.

Petar Zrinski was involved in the poorly organized rebellion together with his older brother Nikola Zrinski and his brother-in-law Fran Krsto Frankopan and Hungarian noblemen. In the preparations of the plot, plans were disrupted by the death of Nikola Zrinski in the woods near Čakovec by a wounded wild boar. Later rumours insisted that he had in fact perished not in this accident but at the hands of murderers loyal to Habsburg rule; nevertheless this claim remained unsubstantiated. Petar succeeded his brother as Ban of Croatia.

The conspirators, who hoped to gain foreign aid in their attempts, entered into secret negotiations with a number of nations: including France, Sweden, the Polish-Lithuanian Commonwealth and the Republic of Venice, even the Ottoman Empire. All such efforts proved unavailing – in fact, the High Porte informed Leopold of the conspiracy in 1666. It turned out, also, that there was at least one pro-Austrian informant among the rebels. As a consequence the plans for an uprising had made little headway before the conspirators were arrested.

=== Final revolt and suppression ===
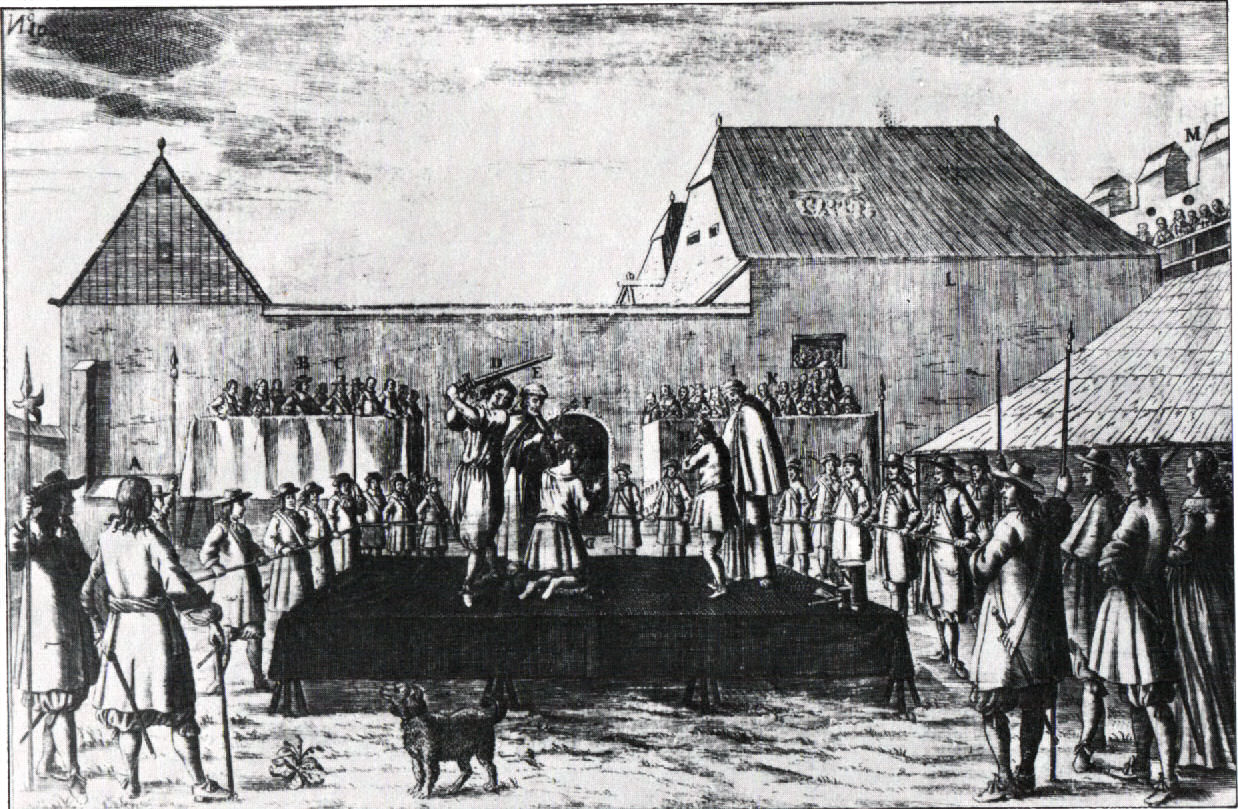
Execution of Zrinski and Frankopan in Wiener Neustadt on 30 April 1671

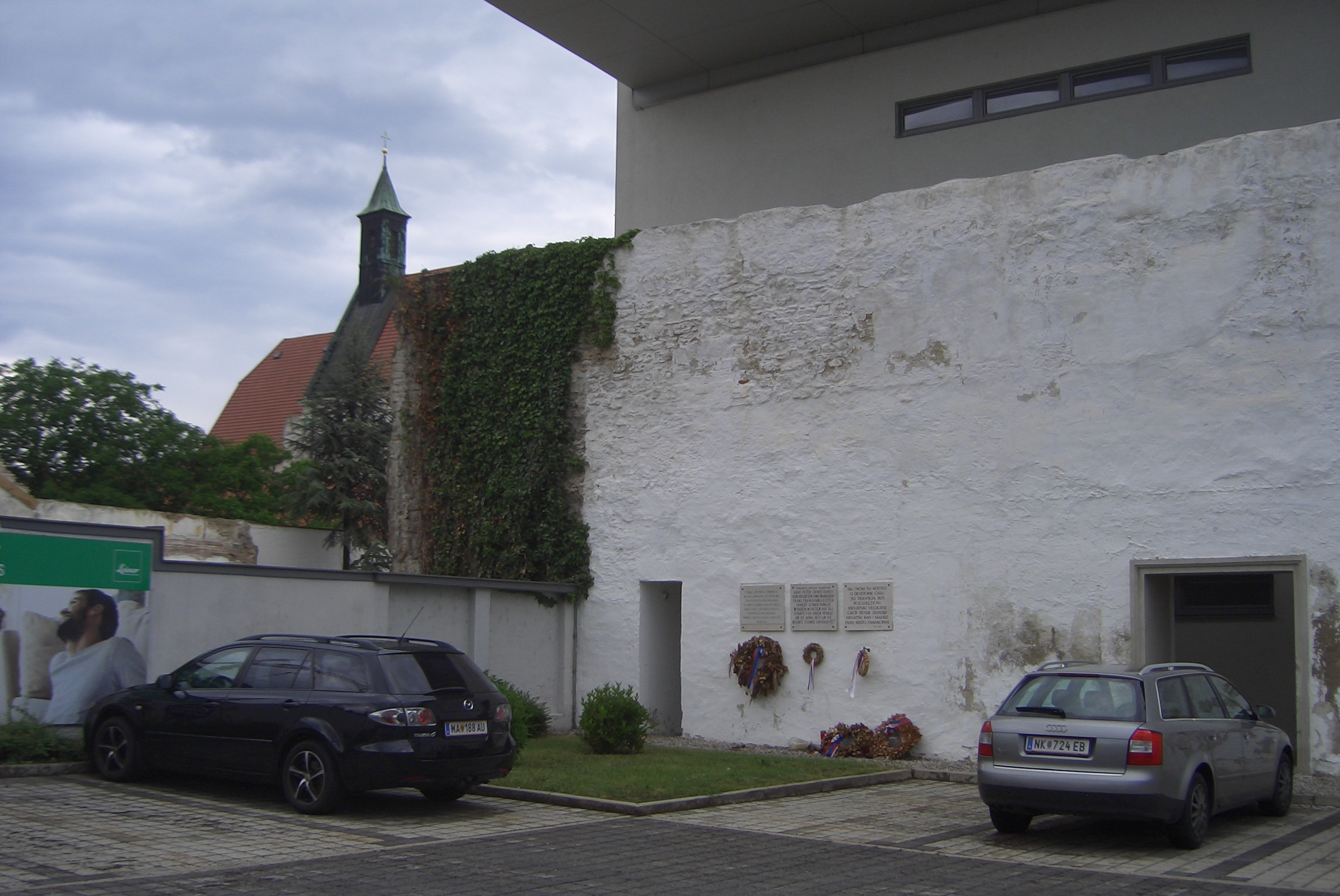
Memorial plaques on the execution site, at the southern ramparts of Wr. Neustadt (2017)

Zrinski and Frankopan, unaware of their detection, nevertheless continued planning the plot. When they tried to trigger a revolt by taking command of the Croatian troops, they were quickly repulsed, and the revolt collapsed. Finding themselves in a desperate position, they finally went to Vienna to ask emperor Leopold I of the Habsburg dynasty for pardon. They were offered safe conduct but were arrested. A tribunal chaired by chancellor Johann Paul Hocher sentenced them to death for high treason on 23 and 25 April 1671.

For Petar Zrinski the verdict was read as follows:

...he committed the greater sin than the others in aspiring to obtain the same station as his Majesty, that is, to be an independent Croatian ruler, and therefore he indeed deserves to be crowned not with a crown, but with a bloody sword.

Zrinski and Frankopan were executed by beheading on 30 April 1671 in Wiener Neustadt. Their estates were confiscated and their families relocated – Zrinski's wife, Katarina Zrinska, was interned in the Dominican convent in Graz where she fell mentally ill and remained until her death in 1673, two of his daughters died in a monastery, and his son Ivan Antun (John Anthony) died in madness, after twenty years of terrible imprisonment and torture, on 11 November 1703. The oldest daughter Jelena, already married in northeastern Upper Hungary, survived and continued the resistance.

Some 2,000 other nobles were arrested as part of a mass crackdown. Two more leading conspirators – Franz III. Nádasdy, Chief Justice of Hungary, and Styrian governor, Count Hans Erasmus von Tattenbach – were executed (the latter in Graz on 1 December 1671).

In the view of Emperor Leopold, the Croats and Hungarians had forfeited their right to self-administration through their role in the attempted rebellion. Leopold suspended the constitution – already, the Zrinski trial had been conducted by an Austrian, not a Hungarian court – and ruled Hungary like a conquered province.

=== Letter of Petar Zrinski ===
His final letter addressed to his wife before his execution was titled "Moje drago Zercze" (My dear heart) and had been translated by contemporaries to German, Hungarian, Dutch, French, Italian, English, Latin and Spanish languages from the original Croatian. It is considered as the first widely translated Croatian text and an example of a deeply intimate and aesthetically valuable confessional letter.

== Poetry ==
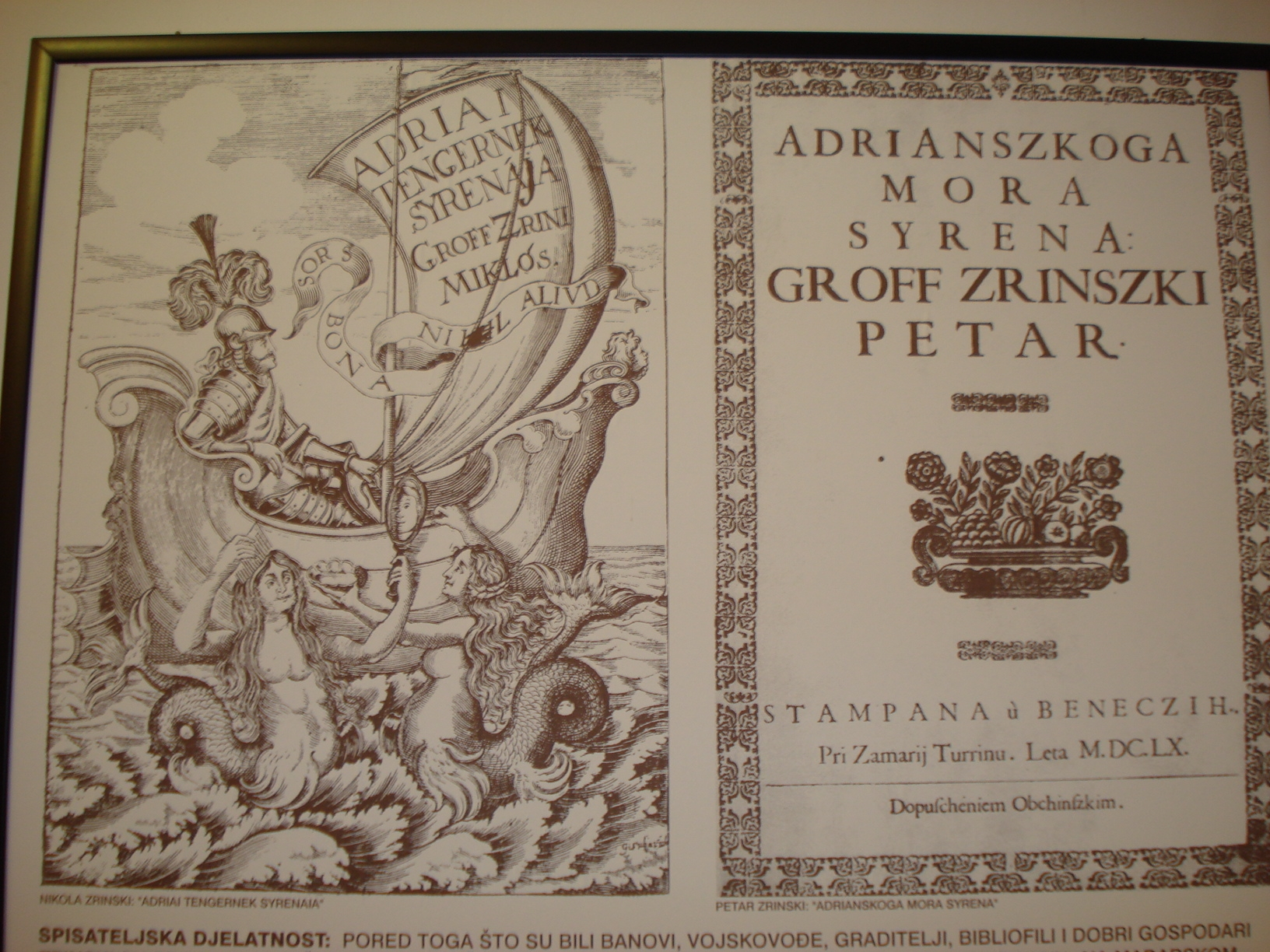
Petar Zrinski translated his brother Nikola's epic poem The Siren of the Adriatic Sea into Croatian

Besides being one of the most important military figures of the 17th century Croatia, Zrinski is also known for his literary works. Along with his wife Katarina, brother Miklós Zrínyi (although Miklós wrote in Hungarian and Latin) and brother-in-law Fran Krsto Frankopan he contributed greatly to 17th-century Croatian poetry.

He published a translation of his brother's work Adrianskoga mora sirena (Syren of the Adriatic Sea) in 1660, to which he contributed his own verses and poetic ideas.

== Legacy ==
Ragusan poet Vladislav Menčetić dedicated his 1665 epic poem Trublja Slovinska to Petar Zrinski, where he was elevated as the saviour of Christendom against the Ottoman Empire. In a similar way, historian Johannes Lucius dedicated the map of Illyria "Illyricum hodiernum" within his work "De Regno Dalmatiae et Croatia" (1668; On the Kingdom of Dalmatia and Croatia) to him.

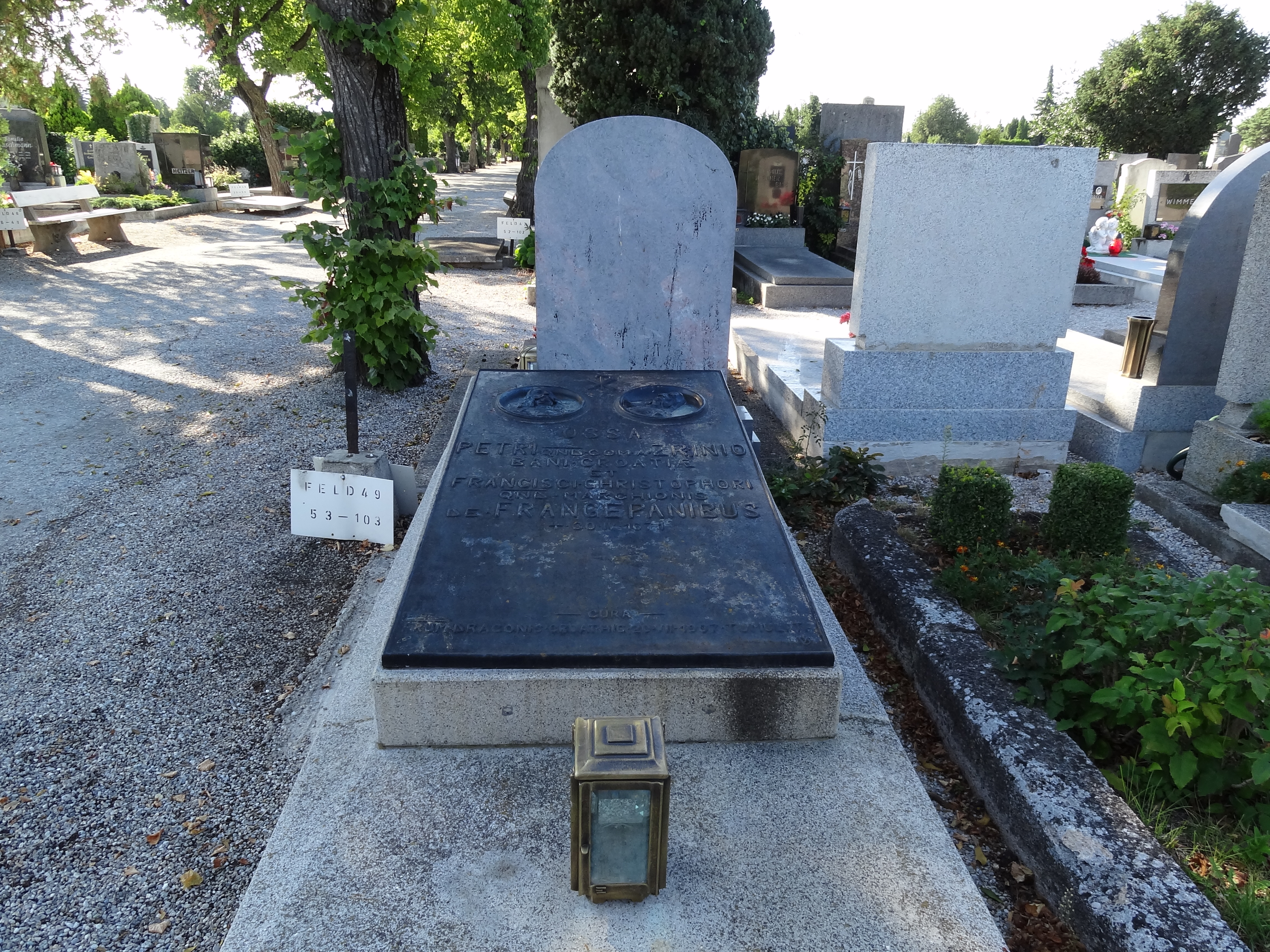
Tombstone of Petar Zrinski and Fran Krsto Frankopan in Wiener Neustadt

=== Modern ===
The bones of Zrinski and Frankopan were found in Austria in 1907 and brought to Zagreb in 1919, where they were reburied in the Zagreb Cathedral.

Zrinski and Frankopan are still widely regarded as national heroes in Croatia as well as Hungary. Their portraits were depicted on the obverse of the Croatian 5 kuna banknote, issued in 1993 and 2001.

== See also ==
- Zrinski family tree
- Zrinski–Frankopan conspiracy
- Wesselényi conspiracy

Preceded by Nikola Zrinski	Ban of Croatia; 1665–1670	Succeeded by Nikola Erdödy
