= Ferdinand Gobert von Aspremont-Lynden =

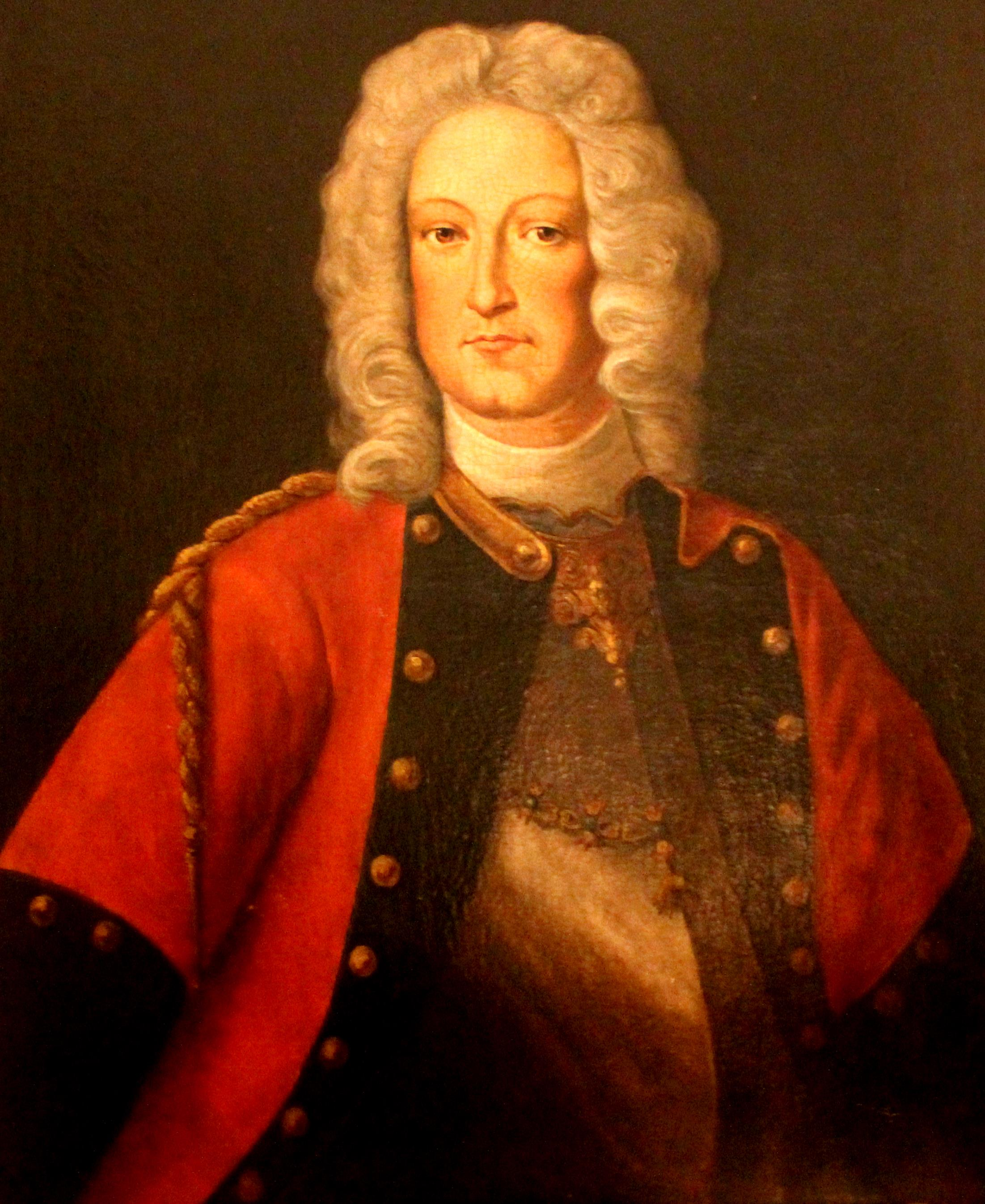
Ferdinand Gobert, Graf von Aspremont-Lynden

Ferdinand-Gobert Count of Aspremont-Lynden (Oud-Rekem, c. 1645 – 1 February 1708) was an Austrian General from the Southern Netherlands who fought in the service of the Habsburg Emperor Leopold I.

== Biography ==
Lynden was born in the noble family Aspremont-Lynden as the son of Count Ferdinand of Aspremont-Lynden (1611–1665) and his wife, Landgravine Elisabeth zu Fürstenberg-Heiligenberg (1621–1662). He grew up at the Aspremont-Lynden Castle, in the county of Rekem (Reckheim), a small County in present-day Belgium, belonging to the Holy Roman Empire. Lynden became an officer in the service of the Holy Roman Empire and its Habsburg emperor in Vienna.

He fought in the Great Turkish War and helped defend the capital Vienna during the Battle of Vienna. After the victory, Lynden fought in Hungary, which the Austrians captured from the Ottomans. In 1690, he was responsible of the defense of Belgrade, which had been conquered from the Ottomans in 1688.

Taking advantage of the weakness on the eastern border of the Holy Roman Empire, because of the French invasion on the Rhine during the Nine Years' War, the Ottomans returned to besiege Belgrade in 1690. The Ottomans were led by Grand Vizier Köprülüzade Fazıl Mustafa Pasha and succeeded in detonating the citadel's powder magazine. The Ottomans took Belgrade, but several hundred soldiers escaped by swimming across the Danube, including Lynden and Duke Charles Eugène de Croÿ, another nobleman of the Southern Netherlands.

Back in Vienna, Lynden was put under house arrest because of the debacle at Belgrade.
Nevertheless, after the final victory in the Great Turkish War, Emperor Leopold I granted Lynden the rank of General, and later Feldmarschall-leutnant of the Holy Roman Empire for his services in the Great Turkish War. He died in 1708 at the castle in Oud-Rekem, where he was born.

=== Marriage and children ===
In 1680, Ferdinand Gobert was firstly married Princess Charlotte von Nassau-Dillenburg (1643–1686), daughter of George Louis, Prince of Nassau-Dillenburg.
After her death, in 1691 in Vienna he remarried. The bride was Princess Juliana Barbara Rákóczi (1669–1717), daughter of Francis I Rákóczi, Prince of Transylvania.
They had 7 children including :

- Count Joseph Gobert von Aspremont-Lynden (1694–1720)
- Count Karl Gobert Franz von Aspremont-Lynden (1703–1749), had issue.

== Sources ==
- Biographie Nationale de Belgique, Tome 1er (Wikisource)
- Deutsche Biographie
