= Fužine, Croatia =

Fužine
- Municipality
- Općina Fužine; Municipality of Fužine
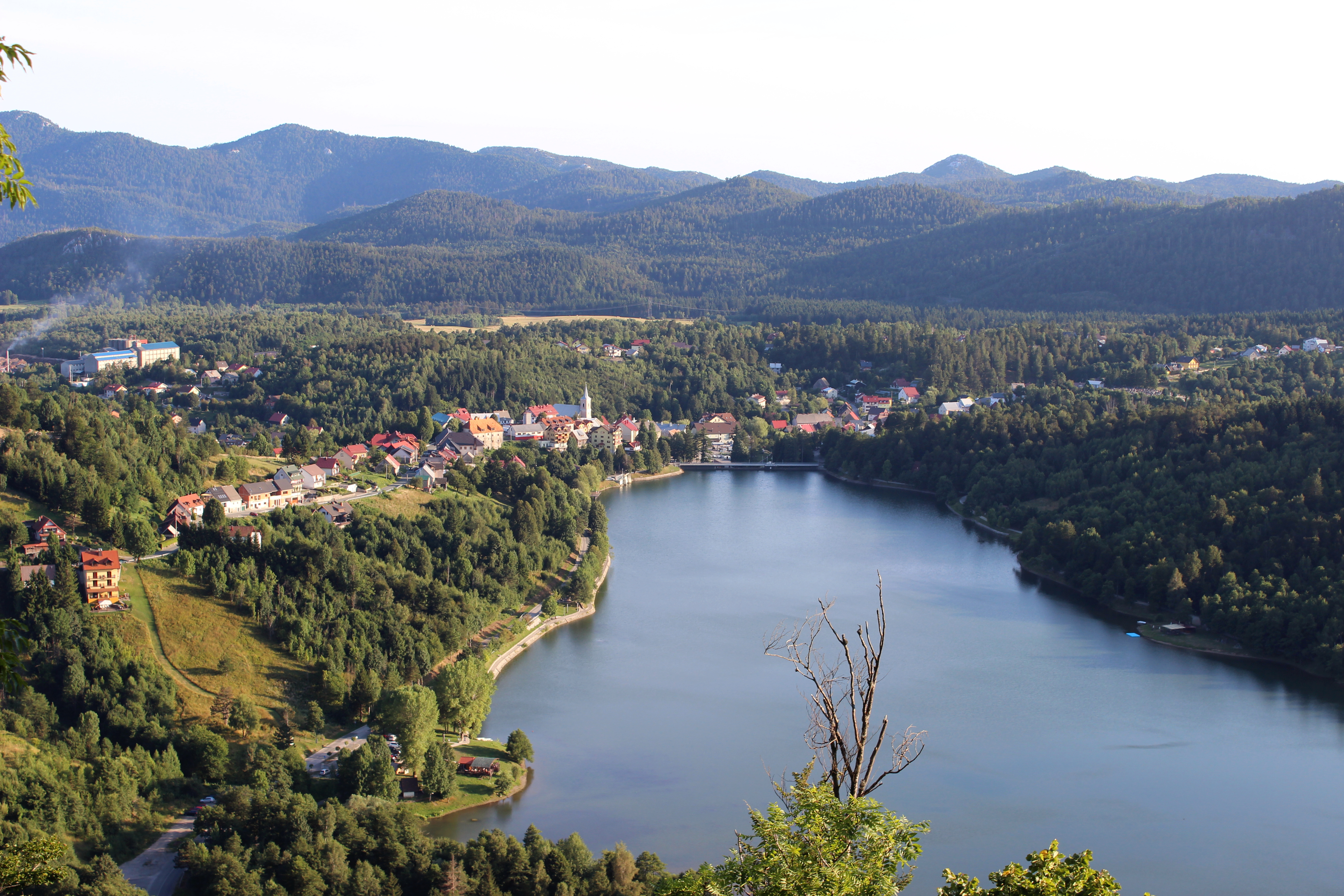
- Fužine in summer

- Location of Fužine in Croatia
- Coordinates: 45.3053°N 14.7156°E
- Country: Croatia
- County: Primorje-Gorski Kotar County
- Founded: 17th century

Government
  - Mayor: Marianko Kauzlarić

Area
  - Municipality: 85.8 km^{2} (33.1 sq mi)
  - Urban: 20.9 km^{2} (8.1 sq mi)
- Elevation: 722 m (2,369 ft)

Population (2021)
  - Municipality: 1,394
  - Density: 16.2/km^{2} (42.1/sq mi)
  - Urban: 597
  - Urban density: 28.6/km^{2} (74.0/sq mi)
- Time zone: UTC+1 (Central European Time)
- Postal Code: 51322
- Area code: 051
- Vehicle registration: DE
- Website: fuzine.hr

Fužine is a village and a municipality located in Primorje-Gorski Kotar County, 10 km away from the coast and 30 km away from the city of Rijeka. It is situated at 722 meters above sea level while being surrounded by mountains and three large artificial accumulation lakes (Bajer, Potkoš and Lepenica).

== Geography ==
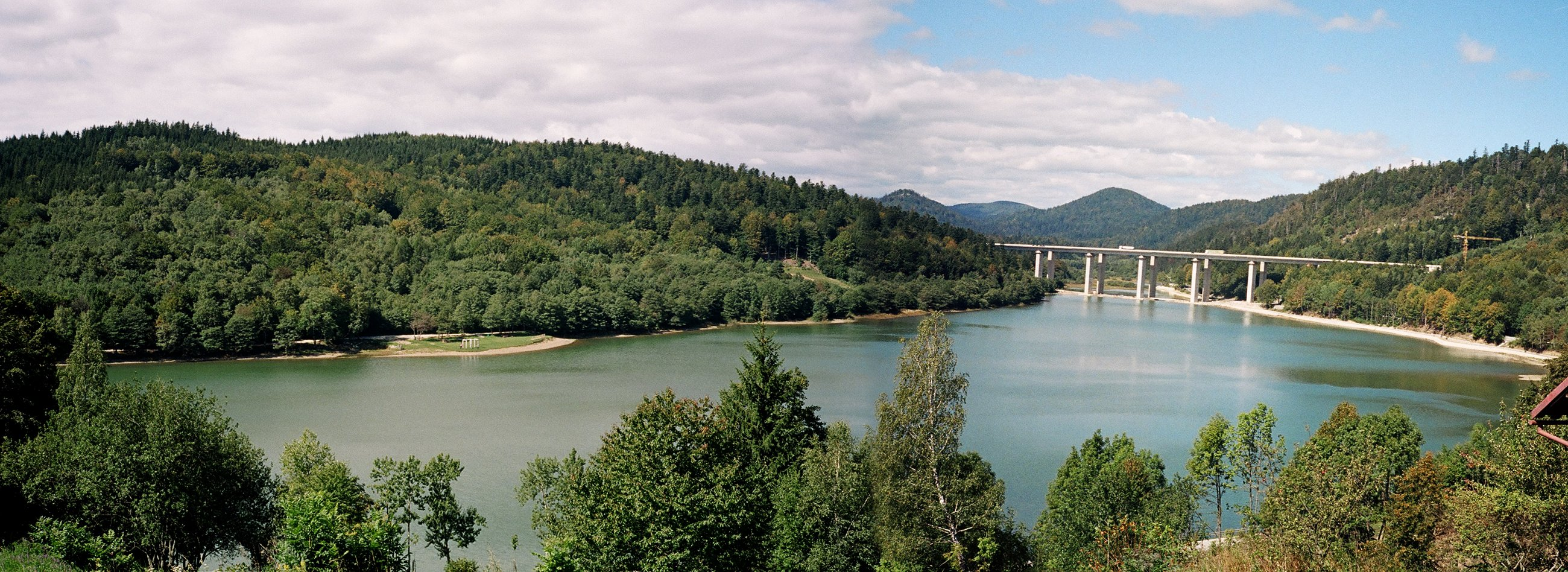
Lake Bajer is spanned by the Bajer Bridge that carries the A6 motorway.

There are three large man-made lakes (Bajer and Lepenica) and one small lake (Potkoš) in Fužine.

All the lakes are used for generating electricity. There is also a cave in Fužine named Vrelo.

The area is surrounded by the mountains of Tuhobić, Viševica, and Bitoraj.

== Climate ==
Between 1955 and 1972, the highest temperature recorded at the Brana weather station was 33.6 °C (92.5 °F), on 6 July 1957. The coldest temperature was −29.4 °C (−20.9 °F), on 14 January 1968.

== History ==
Fužine was built in the 17th century when the House of Zrinski opened an iron mine in this area of Gorski Kotar.

Fužine got its name from blacksmiths, because there were many blacksmiths in Fužine fixing carriages.

Significant events include the 1727 construction of the Karolina road connecting Bakar with Karlovac.

In 1780, Maurice Benyovszky received permission from the emperor to found a society to support the transport of goods along the Karolina road. Such societies already existed in Vrbovsko, Fužine and Karlovac.

In 1873, the Zagreb-Rijeka railroad came.

The volunteer fire department DVD Fužine was founded in 1876, and is today part of the VZ općine Fužine. The current commander of the VZ and DVD is Filip Milković.

=== Kingdom of Yugoslavia ===
The winter of 1931–1932 was particularly harsh in Čabar and surrounding areas. The lack of livestock feed caused a sharp decrease in livestock price. In the spring, a lack of supplies threatened to collapse the resale and even financial sectors locally. On 30 April 20, the emergency Law on the Protection of Farmers (Serbian: Zakon o zaštiti zemljoradnika) came into force, which prevented forcible sale of farmland until 20 October.

The local chapter of the HPS is HPD "Viševica", had lain dormant for years thanks to many members leaving Fužine until it was revived by its new president Lavoslav Lovrić, who arrived as the administrator of the Šumska uprava. In 1937, their first expedition was planned together with Matica of Zagreb to cross over Risnjak, Platak, Obruč and Viševica to the sea. In 1939, it had 39 members.

=== WWII ===
During WWII, 194 people were killed in the kotar of Fužine, of which 123 by Italians, 64 by Germans and 7 by Croats.

==== 1941 ====
In August 1941, the Minister of Sport and Mountaineering of the NDH, Miško Zebić, named Tugomil Paškvan as the state povjerenik of the HPD "Viševica", and designated as the chapter's advisory board: Marijan Zima, Leopold Klausberger, Albert Bubanj, Vjekoslav Krizman, Franjo Kauzlarić. The HPD "Viševica" was officially renamed Hrvatsko planinarsko društvo u Fužinama in March 1942, but Fužine did not reply to the order.

==== 1942 ====
At 7:30 on 12 April 1942, an Italian battalion was travelling on foot along the road from Delnice to Fužine. At the south exit from Delnice they were attacked from a small woods by Partisans of the Second Primorje-Gorski Kotar Detachment with machine guns and rifles, heavily wounding 1 and lightly wounding 4.

On 16 May, rebels attacked and disarmed the aviation weather station in Fužine.

On 15 June, Partisans ambushed an armed patrol (Note: Nikola Matovina, Ante Blažević, Pavao Miklić and Mujo Kolić.) with rifles once it had left Fužine for Lič. The Italian soldiers at the railway station in Fužine noticed and opened machine gun fire towards the attackers, causing the Partisans to flee.

On the 17th between Fužine and Lič, about 40 Partisans dressed in Ustaša uniforms but with Partisan caps carried out a rifle attack on a train travelling from Plasa to Delnice. 9 railway workers jumped out and dispersed into the forest, but the conductor Aleksander Španer of Hrvatske Moravice was heavily wounded, receiving first aid in Lič. The Partisans then attacked the railway guard station 420, which completely burned down. Then on the 19th, Partisans ambushed the armed convoy of Nikola Matovina (Note: He was leading three privates: Ante Blažević, Pavao Miklić and Mujo Kolić.) 0.8 kilometres (0.50 mi) southeast of Fužine. Once the attack was noticed by the Italians at the railway station, they opened machine gun fire in the direction of the Partisans, who retreated into the forest.

At 17:20 on 14 September, a freight train transporting internees from Ogulin to Italy between Fužine and Lič was derailed by a section of track that had been destroyed, killing 2 Carabinieri and 1 civilian and wounding 6 Italian soldiers, 1 Croatian soldier and 1 railway worker. The Partisans then attacked, but the attack was repelled and the internees transported to Italy.

==== 1945 ====
At the behest of Dušan Rašković, Josip Snolković parish priest of Fužine and others gathered in Delnice signed a document recognising the Unitary National Liberation Front on 21 February 1945, selecting a delegation to represent the priesthood before their authority.

=== Recent ===
Fužine was hit by the 2014 Dinaric ice storm. From 31 January to 2 February 2014, while S and SW geostrophic wind dominated, freezing rain fell on Gorski Kotar, glazing the entire region. It wrecked roofs, power lines an forests, causing power loss for about 14,000 households in Gorski Kotar, or about 80% of its population. Because of power lines falling on the A6, the highway was closed in of Rijeka between Bosiljevo and Kikovica, and between Kikovica and Delnice in the direction of Zagreb. It took about 10 days to restore essential infrastructure to the region, and within months electricity was back in most of its former range, but at a cost of about 84.4 million HRK to HEP. At the time it was the largest peacetime damage since its Secession from Yugoslavia, even without counting the forestry losses. The Šumarija Fužine lost 38% of its wood mass. Clearing blocked forestry roads and forest paths would take years, and thanks to the declining population some were never cleared. All three main power lines in Fužine were severed, leaving the area without electricity.

On 26 March 2022 at 14:49 the DVD Fužine received a call about a wildfire in the area of Donje Selo. 0.9 hectares (2.2 acres) burned by the time it was put out at 16:53 by DVD Fužine and DVD Vrata. While fighting the fire, the body of a man it had killed was found.

== Demographics ==
In 1870, Fužine općina, in Delnice podžupanija, had 618 houses, with a population of 3837. Its 9 villages were divided into 3 porezne obćine for taxation purposes. Parishes included Fužine and Lič.

In 1895, the obćina of Fužine (court at Fužine), with an area of 50 square kilometres (19 mi^{2}), belonged to the kotar of Delnice (Delnice court and electoral district) in the županija of Modruš-Rieka (Ogulin court and financial board). There were 437 houses, with a population of 2662. Its 5 villages and were divided for taxation purposes into 2 porezne obćine, under the Delnice office.

The total population of Fužine municipality is 1394, in the following settlements:

- Belo Selo, population 66 ▲
- Benkovac Fužinski, population 40 ▲
- Fužine, population 597 ▼
- Lič, population 446 ▼
- Slavica, population ▲35 ▲
- Vrata, population 210 ▼
Municipality of Fužine: Population trends 1857–2021
v

population	3492	3837	3651	4093	4142	3539	3188	2966	2521	2907	2793	2443	2271	2000	1855	1592	1394
	1857	1869	1880	1890	1900	1910	1921	1931	1948	1953	1961	1971	1981	1991	2001	2011	2021

Note:Split from the old Delnice općina. Sources: Croatian Bureau of Statistics publications
Town of Fužine: Population trends 1857–2021
v

population	1100	1325	1252	1331	1308	1071	1042	909	811	971	844	828	805	740	814	685	597
	1857	1869	1880	1890	1900	1910	1921	1931	1948	1953	1961	1971	1981	1991	2001	2011	2021

Sources: Croatian Bureau of Statistics publications

== Governance ==
=== National ===
At the 1920 Kingdom of Serbs, Croats and Slovenes Constitutional Assembly election in Modruš-Rijeka County, Fužine voted mainly for the Democratic Party and the Communist Party.

Results at the poll in Fužine
Year	Voters	Electors	NRS	DSD	KPJ	HPSS	Independent	SS	HSP	HZ
1920	407	329	1	92	68	7	3	3	12	43

== Economy ==
=== Tourism ===
Fužine has a long tourism tradition. A lot of people started to come to Fužine to get away from the city life. There are numerous bike routes and hiking trails in the mountains surrounding the village. The Vrelo cave is opened for tourist throughout whole year. The cave is also accessible for people with wheelchair, and other disabilities. Fužine also has a lot of festivities during the year:

- Summer in Fužine - concerts, sport competitions
- Big New Year's Eve party in the noon
- Lake regatta
- World championship in underwater orientation
- Fishing contest

=== Industry ===
Fužine has a number of saw mills. It also contains a large plant (Drvenjača d.d.) for producing cellulose pulp for paper manufacturing.

== Culture ==
=== Cuisine ===
The society Plodovi gorja Gorskog kotara (Note: Official website) organises "Strawberry days" (Croatian: Dani jagoda), "Lavender days" (Croatian: Dani lavande) and "Berry days" (Croatian: Dani bobičastog voća in Fužine.

== Sports ==
Beginning in 2013, the 7 stage 260 kilometres (160 mi) long Cycling Trail of Gorski Kotar (Croatian: Goranska biciklistička transverzala) passes through Fužine, where the sixth stage ends and the seventh begins.

The "Gorski Kotar Bike Tour", held annually since 2012, sometimes goes through Fužine, such as in the first leg for 2022 and the third leg for 2024, both of which started and ended in Fužine.

== Infrastructure ==
=== Health ===
Fužine had a Home for Healing of Weak Children (Croatian: Dom za oporavak slabudnjave djece).

=== Forestry ===
The forestry offices of Delnice srez were in Fužine and Mrkopalj.

=== Security ===
In 1913, there were three gendarmeries in Delnice kotar: one in Delnice itself, one in Brod Moravice and one in Fužine.

=== Judiciary ===
In 1875, the kotar court of Delnice encompassed a population of 28,347, being responsible for the općine: Delnice, Lokve, Fužine, Mrkopalj, Ravna Gora, Brod, Skrad, Vrbovsko.

== Notable people ==
- Krešo Golik, movie maker
- Franjo Rački, historian
- Viktor Bubanj, general and National Hero of Yugoslavia
- Dario Knežević, football player
- Vojislav Mišković, astronomer
- Ivanka Trohar, Yugoslav Partisan

== Bibliography ==
- Leksikografski zavod Miroslav Krleža (2013–2024). "Fužine". Hrvatska enciklopedija (online ed.). Archived from the original on 2023-12-28.
- Geriol Nemet, Antonija (2010). Fužine – antički Lič: Prilog proučavanju i vrednovanju kulturne i prirodne baštine. Delnice: Ogranak Matice hrvatske u Delnicama.
- Kauzlarić Andrić, Neda, ed. (1985). Fužine, Lič, Vrata Belo Selo, Slavica, Benkovac: U povodu 200. godišnjice Škole Fužine (1785. – 1985.). ISBN 86-7071-039-0.
- Hirc, Dragutin (1898) [written 1898-02-08]. "Fužina". Gorski kotar: slike, opisi i putopisi. Illustrated by Václav Lev Anderle. Zagreb: 🖶 Lavoslav Hartman (Kugli i Deutsch). pp. 1–10. Republished as Hirc, Dragutin (1993) [written 1898-02-08]. "Fužina". Gorski kotar: slike, opisi i putopisi. Illustrated by Václav Lev Anderle. Rijeka: 🖶 Tiskara Rijeka. pp. 1–10. ISBN 953-158-004-9.

=== Architecture ===
- Bradanović, Marijan (2021-01-07) [received 2020-04-15]. "Župna crkva sv. Antuna Padovanskog u Fužinama – primjer arhitekture klasicizma u Gorskom kotaru" [The Parish Church of St. Anthony of Padua in Fužine – An Example of the Classicist Architecture in Gorski kotar]. Problemi sjevernog Jadrana. 18: 133–158. doi:10.21857/90836c71xy. eISSN 1848-7866.

=== History ===
- Delač-Petković, Karmen (2016-10-01). "Deset godina rada fužinarske čitaonice "Dr. Franjo Rački"". Knjižničar/Knjižničarka: E-časopis Knjižničarskog društva Rijeka. 7: 49–59. eISSN 1848-5790.
- Bujan-Kovačević, Zlata (2010). Fužinarski Bunjevci: Priče iz rodoslovnog istraživanja. ISBN 978-953-7002-60-2.
- Trgo, Fabijan, ed. (1964). Zbornik dokumenata i podataka o Narodno-oslobodilačkom ratu Jugoslovenskih naroda. Vol. V, 32.
- Kauzlarić Andrić, Neda (1985). "Postanak, rast i razvoj naselja – stanovništvo i življenje (Fužine, Lič, Vrata, Belo Selo, Slavica i Benkovac)". Fužine, Lič, Vrata Belo Selo, Slavica, Benkovac: U povodu 200. godišnjice Škole Fužine (1785. – 1985.). pp. 17–72. ISBN 86-7071-039-0.
- Erceg, Ivan (1959-03-01). "Prinosi za upoznavanje ekonomskog i pravnog položaja kmetova fužinskog kaštelanata u drugoj polovici 18. stoljeća". Zbornik Odsjeka za povijesne znanosti Zavoda za povijesne i društvene znanosti Hrvatske akademije znanosti i umjetnosti. 2: 227–261. ISSN 1330-7134.

== Bibliography ==
- OONF PGO (1945-03-19). "Svećenstvo Gorskog Kotara pristupa JNOf-i". Primorski vjesnik: Glasilo jedinstvene Narodno-oslobodilačke fronte Hrvatskog primorja (in Serbo-Croatian). No. 144. p. 4.
