= Zrin (disambiguation) =

Zrin is a village in Sisak-Moslavina county, Croatia

Zrin may also refer to:

- Zrin Castle, ruins located in Croatia
- Zrin, a character in the 2011 video game Darkspore

== See also ==
- Zrinski, a Croatian-Hungarian noble family
