= Lič =

Village in Primorje-Gorski Kotar, Croatia

- Village
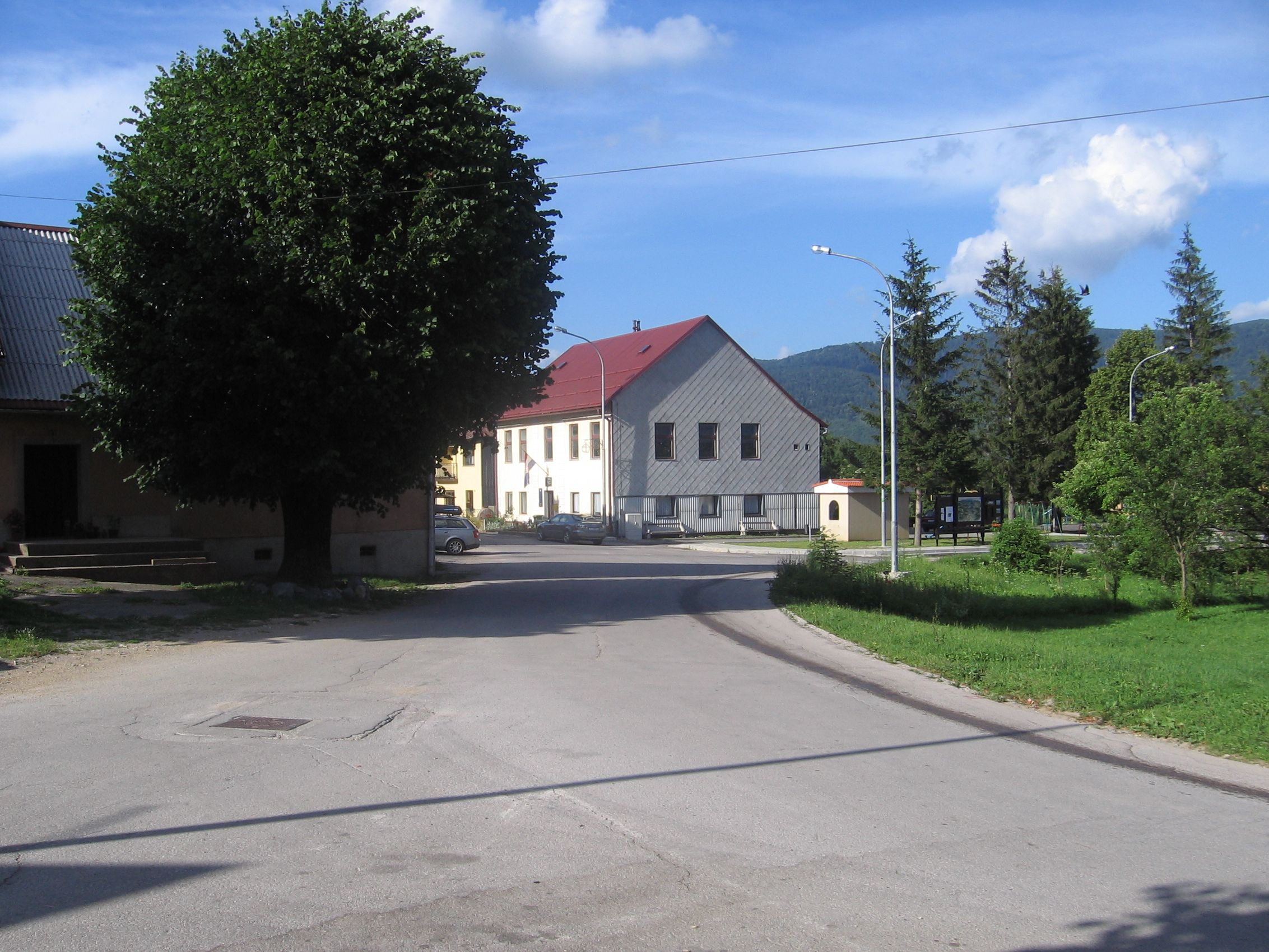
- Street in Lič

- Location within Croatia
- Coordinates: 45.27801°N 14.71810°E
- Country: Croatia
- County: Primorje-Gorski Kotar
- Municipality: Fužine

Area
  - Total: 35.3 km^{2} (13.6 sq mi)

Population (2021)
  - Total: 446
  - Density: 12.6/km^{2} (32.7/sq mi)
- Time zone: UTC+1 (CET)
  - Summer (DST): UTC+2 (CEST)
- Postal code: 51323
- Area code: 051
- Vehicle registration: DE

Lič is a village in Primorje-Gorski Kotar, western Croatia. It is located 2 km to the south of Fužine, which it is also a part of administratively. As of 2021, it had a population of 446. Lič is located not far from Viševica mountain and Lake Bajer. The village is connected by the M202 railway.

== History ==
The volunteer fire department DVD Vrata was founded in 1933, and is today part of the VZ općine Fužine. Its current commander is Dino Polić.

On 17 June between Fužine and Lič, about 40 Partisans dressed in Ustaša uniforms but with Partisan caps carried out a rifle attack on a train travelling from Plasa to Delnice. 9 railway workers jumped out and dispersed into the forest, but the conductor Aleksander Španer of Hrvatske Moravice was heavily wounded, receiving first aid in Lič. The Partisans then attacked the railway guard station 420, which completely burned down.

On 21 April 2023 at 10:10 the JVP Delnice received a call about a hallway fire in Lič. One person was injured. it was put out at 12:00 by JVP Delnice, DVD Lič and DVD Vrata.

On 21 March 2024 at 14:50 the ŽVOC Rijeka received a call about a wildfire in the area. 6 hectares (15 acres) burned by the time it was put out at 16:45 by DVD Lič.

== Climate ==
A weather station exists there at an elevation of 708 metres (2,323 ft). The minimum recorded temperature for the winter of 2024–2025 was −9 °C (16 °F), on February 20th and 21st.

== Demographics ==
In 1895, the obćina of Lič (court at Lič), with an area of 35 square kilometres (14 mi^{2}), belonged to the kotar of Delnice (Delnice court and electoral district) in the županija of Modruš-Rieka (Ogulin court and financial board). There were 270 houses, with a population of 1428. Its 4 villages were encompassed for taxation purposes by a single porezna obćina, under the Delnice office.

Town of Lič: Population trends 1857–2021
v

population	996	918	964	971	1016	1014	908	886	743	767	763	648	532	470	379	504	446
	1857	1869	1880	1890	1900	1910	1921	1931	1948	1953	1961	1971	1981	1991	2001	2011	2021

Sources: Croatian Bureau of Statistics publications

== Governance ==
=== National ===
At the 1920 Kingdom of Serbs, Croats and Slovenes Constitutional Assembly election in Modruš-Rijeka County, Lič voted mainly for the Communist Party and the Croatian Union.

Results at the poll in Lič
Year	Voters	Electors	NRS	DSD	KPJ	HPSS	Independent	SS	HSP	HZ
1920	790	169	1	5	80	1	2	1	6	73

== Culture ==
There is an annual Rosehip Day (Serbo-Croatian: Dan šipka) in Lič.

== Sports ==
The "Gorski Kotar Bike Tour", held annually since 2012, sometimes goes through Lič, such as in the third leg for 2024.

== Bibliography ==
- Žgela, Ivona (2023-09-11) [defended 2023-09-20]. Izazovi ruralnog turizma Gorskog kotara [Challenges of rural tourism in Gorski kotar] (Thesis) (in Serbo-Croatian). Rijeka: Sveučilište u Rijeci.
