= Belo Selo =

Village in Primorje-Gorski Kotar, Croatia

- Village
- Location within Croatia
- Coordinates: 45.32801°N 14.74044°E
- Country: Croatia
- County: Primorje-Gorski Kotar
- Municipality: Fužine

Area
  - Total: 3.0 km^{2} (1.2 sq mi)

Population (2021)
  - Total: 66
  - Density: 22/km^{2} (57/sq mi)
- Time zone: UTC+1 (CET)
  - Summer (DST): UTC+2 (CEST)
- Postal code: 51322
- Area code: 051
- Vehicle registration: DE

Belo Selo is a village in Primorje-Gorski Kotar, western Croatia. It is located 2 km to the northeast of Fužine, which it is also a part of administratively. As of 2021, it had a population of 66. The village is connected by the A6 motorway.

== History ==
From 31 January to 2 February 2014, while S and SW geostrophic wind dominated, freezing rain fell on Gorski Kotar, glazing the entire region. It wrecked roofs, power lines an forests, causing power loss for about 14,000 households in Gorski Kotar, or about 80% of its population. Because of power lines falling on the A6, the highway was closed in of Rijeka between Bosiljevo and Kikovica, and between Kikovica and Delnice in the direction of Zagreb. It took about 10 days to restore essential infrastructure to the region, and within months electricity was back in most of its former range, but at a cost of about 84.4 million HRK to HEP. At the time it was the largest peacetime damage since its Secession from Yugoslavia, even without counting the forestry losses. Clearing blocked forestry roads and forest paths would take years, and thanks to the declining population some were never cleared.

On 11 December 2017, severe wind damaged roofs and closed roads in the region, after which a 33-year-old man in Belo Selo climbed a ladder to repair their roof, only for a gust of wind to knock him from the ladder. The fall was fatal.

== Sports ==
The "Gorski Kotar Bike Tour", held annually since 2012, sometimes goes through Belo Selo, such as in the first leg for 2022 and the first leg for 2023.
