= Benkovac Fužinski =

Village in Primorje-Gorski Kotar, Croatia

- Village
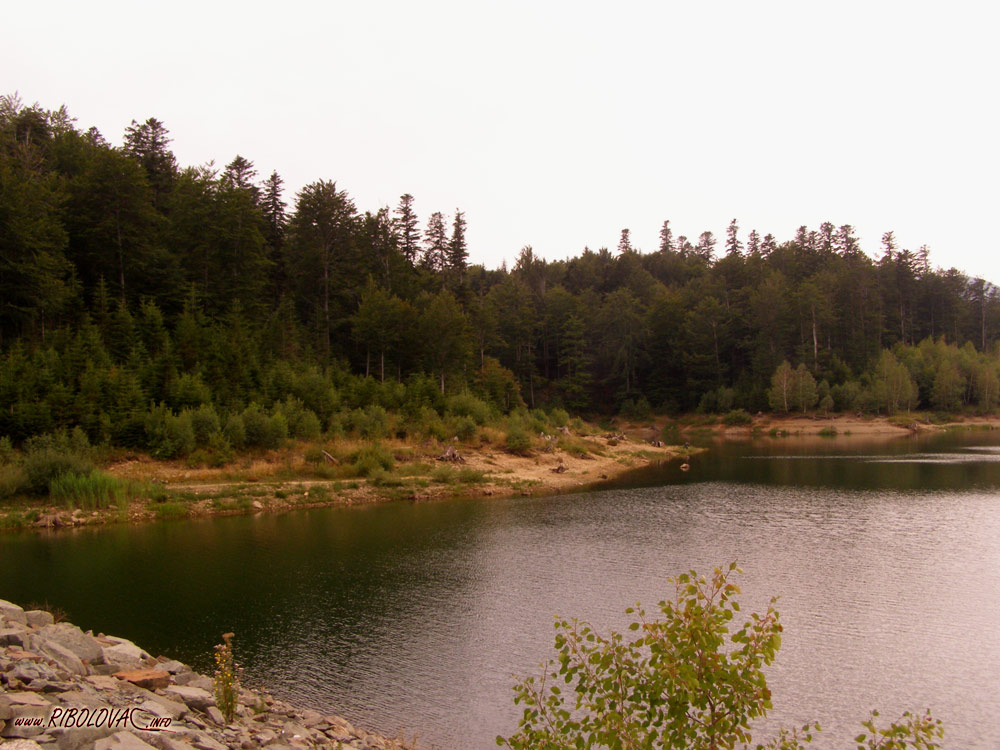
- Lake Lepenica near Benkovac Fužinski

- Location within Croatia
- Coordinates: 45.30945°N 14.68002°E
- Country: Croatia
- County: Primorje-Gorski Kotar
- Municipality: Fužine

Area
  - Total: 12.5 km^{2} (4.8 sq mi)

Population (2021)
  - Total: 40
  - Density: 3.2/km^{2} (8.3/sq mi)
- Time zone: UTC+1 (CET)
  - Summer (DST): UTC+2 (CEST)
- Postal code: 51322
- Area code: 051
- Vehicle registration: DE

Benkovac Fužinski is a village in Primorje-Gorski Kotar, western Croatia. It is located approximately 2.5 km to the west of Fužine, which it is also a part of administratively. As of 2021, it had a population of 40.
