= Slavica, Croatia =

Village in Primorje-Gorski Kotar, Croatia

Slavica
- Village
- Location within Croatia
- Coordinates: 45.33200°N 14.75202°E
- Country: Croatia
- County: Primorje-Gorski Kotar
- Municipality: Fužine

Area
  - Total: 5.1 km^{2} (2.0 sq mi)

Population (2021)
  - Total: 35
  - Density: 6.9/km^{2} (18/sq mi)
- Time zone: UTC+1 (CET)
  - Summer (DST): UTC+2 (CEST)
- Postal code: 51322
- Area code: 051
- Vehicle registration: DE

Slavica is a village in Primorje-Gorski Kotar, western Croatia. It is located approximately 4 km to the northeast of Fužine, which it is also a part of administratively. As of 2021, it had a population of 35.

== History ==
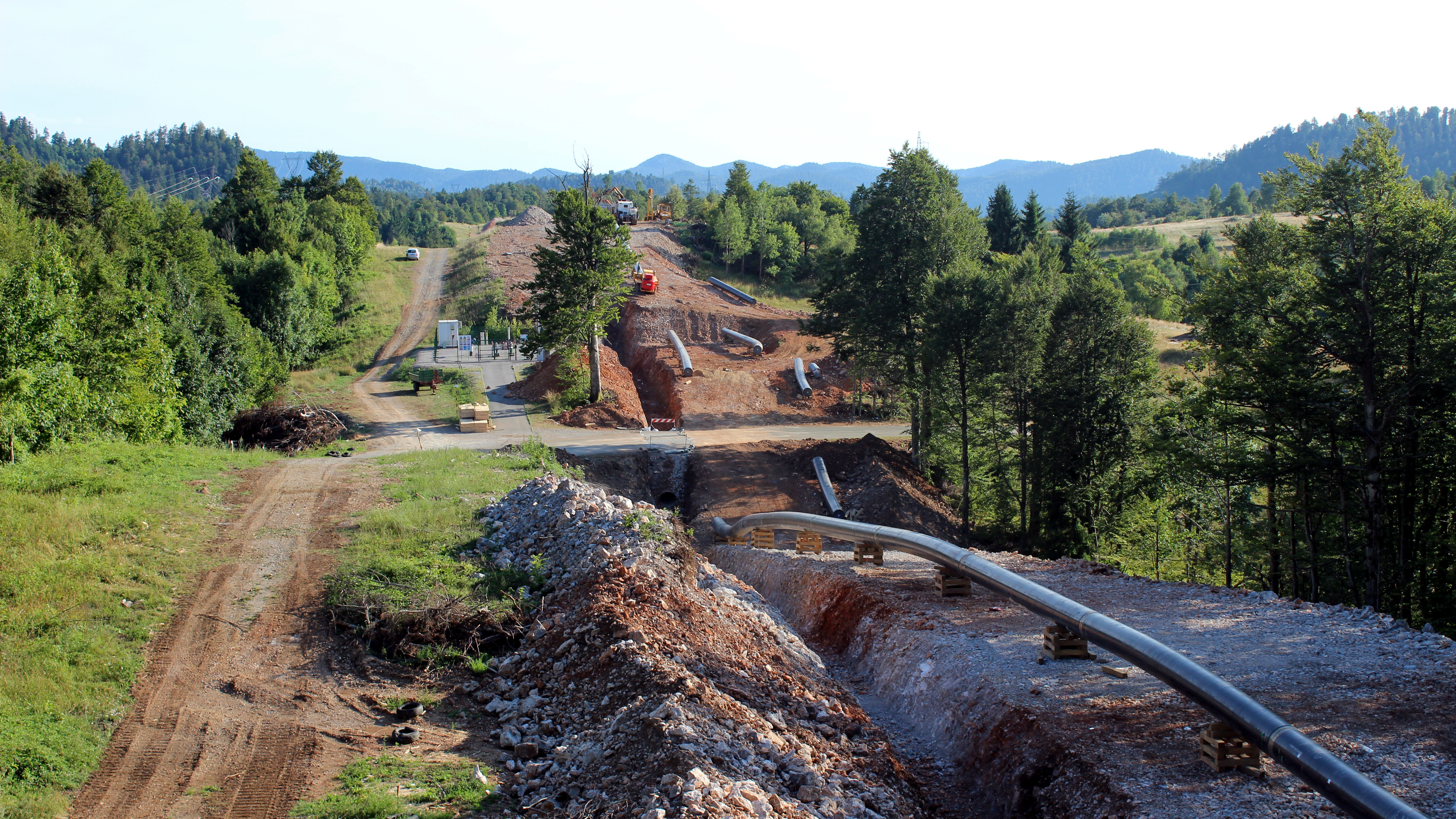
Gas pipeline under construction near Slavica

On 7 February 2012, a house in Slavica caught on fire. The JVP Delnice, DVD Fužine, DVD Vrata, DVD Mrkopalj and DVD Lič were able to save an 84 year old male inhabitant and put out the fire after some difficulty because the temperature had fallen to −19 °C (−2 °F), but another inhabitant died in the fire.

== Sports ==
The "Gorski Kotar Bike Tour", held annually since 2012, sometimes goes through Slavica, such as in the first leg for 2022.
