= Tuhobić (mountain) =

Mountain in Gorski Kotar, Croatia

- Location within Croatia

Highest point
- Elevation: 1,106 m (3,629 ft)
- Coordinates: 45.31377°N 14.661977°E

Geography
- Location: Croatia
- Parent range: Dinaric Alps

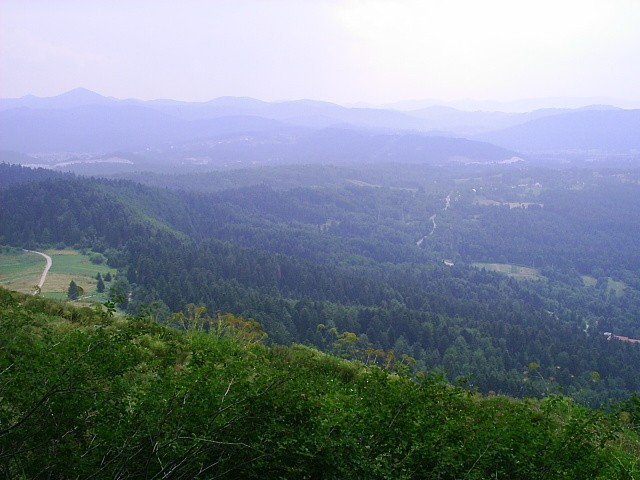
Tuhobić and Bitoraj mountains

Tuhobić is a mountain in Gorski Kotar, Croatia. Its highest peaks are at 1,109 and 1,106 m.a.s.l.

The eponymous Tuhobić Tunnel passes underneath the mountain.

== Bibliography ==
- Poljak, Željko (February 1959). "Tuhobić". Kazalo za "Hrvatski planinar" i "Naše planine" 1898—1958 (PDF). Naše planine. Vol. XI. p. 10. ISSN 0354-0650.
