= Bitoraj =

Mountain in Croatia

- Location within Croatia

Highest point
- Elevation: 1,386 m (4,547 ft)
- Coordinates: 45.290015°N 14.788492°E

Geography
- Location: Croatia
- Parent range: Dinaric Alps

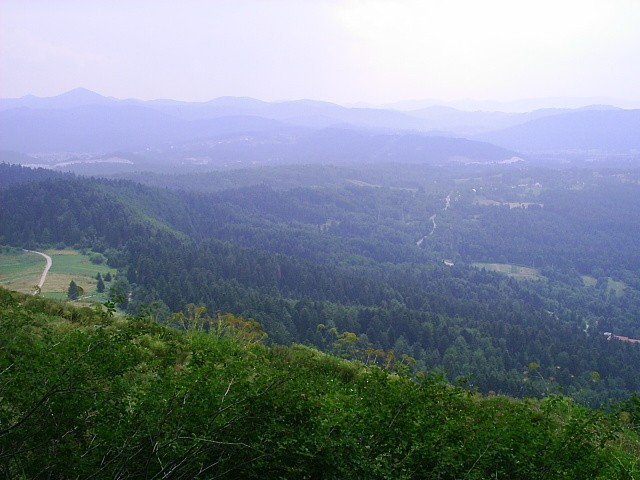
Tuhobić and Bitoraj mountains

Bitoraj is a mountain in Gorski Kotar, Croatia. It is variously defined as a standalone mountain (named Bitoraj or Burni Bitoraj) or as group of peaks of Velika Kapela. The highest peaks on it are Burni Bitoraj at 1,386 m.a.s.l., Velika Javornica at 1374 m.a.s.l., and the eponymous Bitoraj peak at 1,140 m.a.s.l.

== Sources ==
- Croatian Mountaineering Association. "Burni Bitoraj – vrh Bitoraj". plsavez.hr (in Croatian). "N 45° 17' 33.1 E 14° 47' 25.0"
- Ostroški, Ljiljana, ed. (December 2015). "Geographical and meteorological data". Statistički ljetopis Republike Hrvatske 2015 [Statistical Yearbook of the Republic of Croatia 2015] (PDF). Statistical Yearbook of the Republic of Croatia (in Croatian and English). Vol. 47. Zagreb: Croatian Bureau of Statistics. ISSN 1333-3305.
- Pahernik, Mladen (2012). "Prostorna gustoća ponikava na području Republike Hrvatske" [Spatial Density of Dolines in the Croatian Territory]. Hrvatski geografski glasnik (Croatian Geographical Bulletin) (in Croatian). 74 (2): 15. ISSN 1848-6401.

== Bibliography ==
- Leksikografski zavod Miroslav Krleža (2013–2024). "Bitoraj". Hrvatska enciklopedija (online ed.). Archived from the original on 2023-12-28.
- Hirc, Dragutin (1898) [written 1898-02-08]. "Na Bitoraju". Gorski kotar: slike, opisi i putopisi. Illustrated by Václav Lev Anderle. Zagreb: 🖶 Lavoslav Hartman (Kugli i Deutsch). pp. 18–23. Republished as Hirc, Dragutin (1993) [written 1898-02-08]. "Na Bitoraju". Gorski kotar: slike, opisi i putopisi. Illustrated by Václav Lev Anderle. Rijeka: 🖶 Tiskara Rijeka. pp. 18–23. ISBN 953-158-004-9.

=== Alpinism bibliography ===
- Poljak, Željko (February 1959). "Bitoraj". Kazalo za "Hrvatski planinar" i "Naše planine" 1898—1958 (PDF). Naše planine. Vol. XI. p. 10. ISSN 0354-0650.
