= Zrin =

- Village
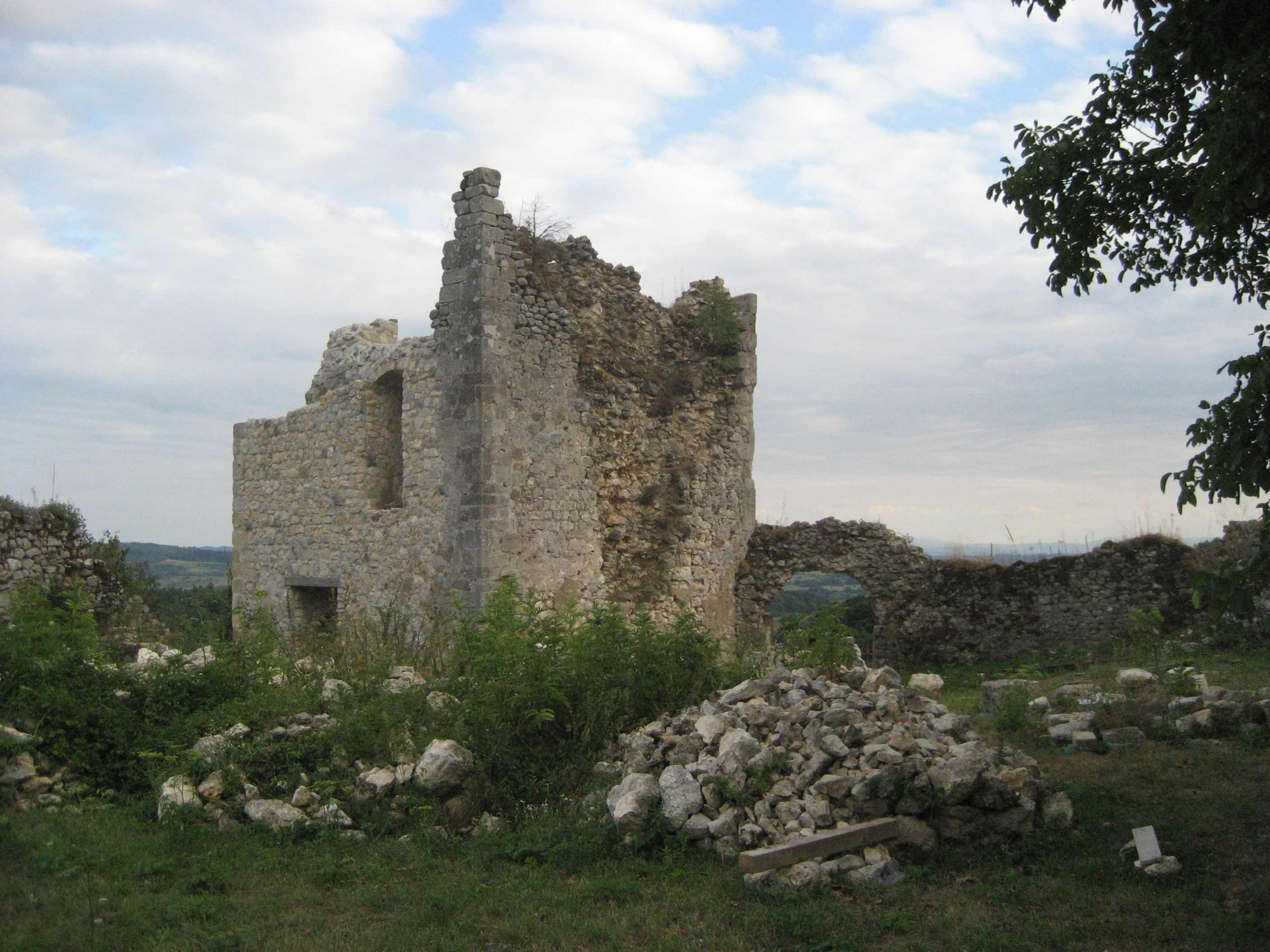
- Zrin castle

- Location within Croatia
- Coordinates: 45°11′31.2″N 16°22′8.4″E
- Country: Croatia
- Region: Continental Croatia (Banovina)
- County: Sisak-Moslavina
- Municipality: Dvor

Area
  - Total: 14.8 km^{2} (5.7 sq mi)

Population (2021)
  - Total: 8
  - Density: 0.54/km^{2} (1.4/sq mi)
- Time zone: UTC+1 (CET)
  - Summer (DST): UTC+2 (CEST)
- Postal code: 44440 Dvor
- Area code: + 385 (0)44

Zrin is a village in Croatia, Sisak-Moslavina County (Dvor Municipality).

In the past it was the seat of the Šubić noble family. Later the family called themselves Zrinski, after Zrin Castle. It was a stronghold of Croatian defense in the Ottoman wars. There are still ruins of Zrin Castle in the village.

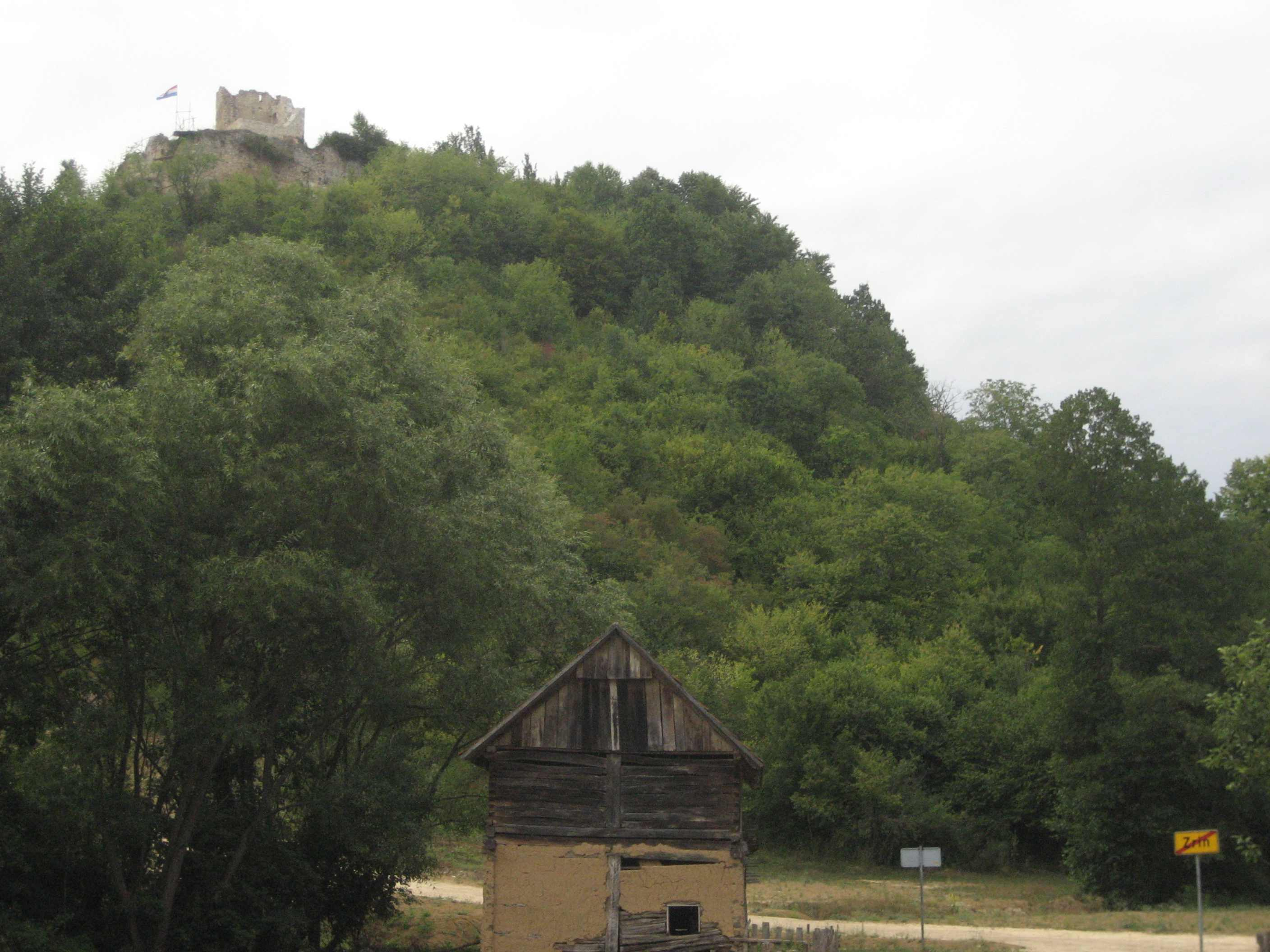
Village limits of Zrin; view of the castle

The Partisans attacked the Croatian village during World War II, based on the propagated lie that there was a sizable Ustaše presence in the village to justify their attack. From the 9–10 September 1943, Partisan forces killed 291 civilians, burned the village down, together with the old Roman Catholic church of the Holy Cross and the Church of Mary Magdalene, forcing the remaining population to flee. After the liberation of Yugoslavia, the communist regime forcefully relocated the remaining Croatian population to confiscated houses in Slavonia after it had exiled the Volksdeutsche Danube Swabians.

In the Croatian War of Independence, Zrin was held by the Serb forces and was part of the unrecognized self-proclaimed Republic of Serbian Krajina. In Operation Storm (1995), Zrin was liberated by the Croatian Army. It is currently inhabited by 9 residents.

== See also ==
- Zrinska gora
- House of Zrinski
