= Viševica =

- Location within Croatia

Highest point
- Elevation: 1,428 m (4,685 ft)
- Coordinates: 45.254589°N 14.800851°E

Geography
- Location: Croatia
- Parent range: Dinaric Alps

Viševica is a mountain in Gorski Kotar, Croatia. Its highest peak is the eponymous Viševica at 1,428 m.a.s.l.

== Bibliography ==
- Poljak, Željko (February 1959). "Viševica". Kazalo za "Hrvatski planinar" i "Naše planine" 1898—1958 (PDF). Naše planine. Vol. XI. p. 10. ISSN 0354-0650.
