= D209 road =

Road in Croatia

D209 state road

Route information
- Length: 17.3 km (10.7 mi)

Major junctions
- From: Mursko Središće border crossing to Slovenia
- D227 in Šenkovec
- To: D3 in Čakovec

Location
- Country: Croatia
- Counties: Međimurje
- Major cities: Čakovec

Highway system
- Highways in Croatia

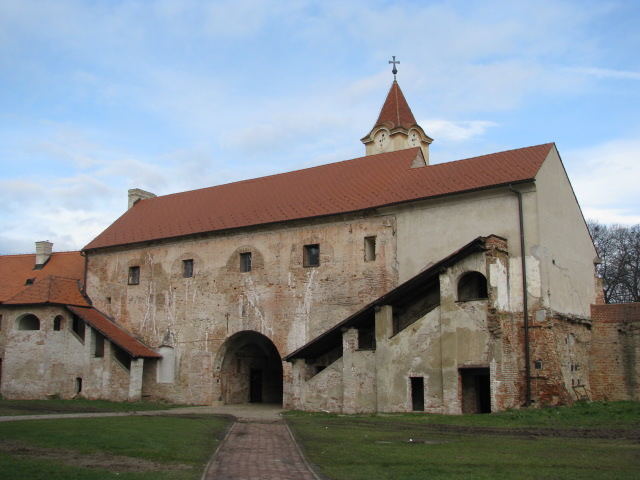
Čakovec, at the southern terminus of the D209 road

D209 is a state road in Međimurje region of Croatia connecting Mursko Središće and nearby border crossing to Slovenia to D3 state road in Čakovec, and the road also serves as a connecting road to the A4 motorway as it terminates near Čakovec interchange (via the D3). The northern terminus of the road is located at Mursko Središće border crossing, providing access to Slovenian town of Lendava and Slovenian A5 motorway in Lendava interchange. The road is 17.3 km (10.7 mi) long.

The road, as well as all other state roads in Croatia, is managed and maintained by Hrvatske ceste, state owned company.

== Traffic volume ==
Traffic is regularly counted and reported by Hrvatske ceste, operator of the road.

D209 traffic volume
Road	Counting site	AADT	ASDT	Notes
D209	1001 Mursko Središće	4,502	5,150	Adjacent to the Ž2003 junction.
D209	1201 Šenkovec	9,905	10,443	Adjacent to the D227 junction.

== Road junctions and populated areas ==
D209 junctions/populated areas
Type	Slip roads/Notes
	Mursko Središće border crossing to Slovenia. Slovenian route 109 to Lendava, Slovenia. The northern terminus of the road.
	Mursko Središće; Ž2003 to Sveti Martin na Muri (to the west) and to Miklavec, Turčišće and Hodošan (D3) (to the east). Ž2006 to Selnica and Prekopa (D227).
	Ž2005 to Zebanec Selo, Selnica and Vrhovljan.
	Štrukovec
	Žiškovec; Ž2008 to Vratišinec and Peklenica.
	Slemenice; Ž2013 to Zasadbreg and Frkanovec.
	Mačkovec
	Šenkovec; D227 to Lopatinec, Prekopa and Štrigova.
	Čakovec; D3 to A4 motorway Čakovec interchange (to the east) and to Varaždin (to the south). The southern terminus of the road.
