= D227 road =

Road in Croatia

D227 state road

Route information
- Length: 19.4 km (12.1 mi)

Major junctions
- From: Banfi border crossing to Slovenia
- To: D209 in Šenkovec

Location
- Country: Croatia
- Counties: Međimurje

Highway system
- Highways in Croatia

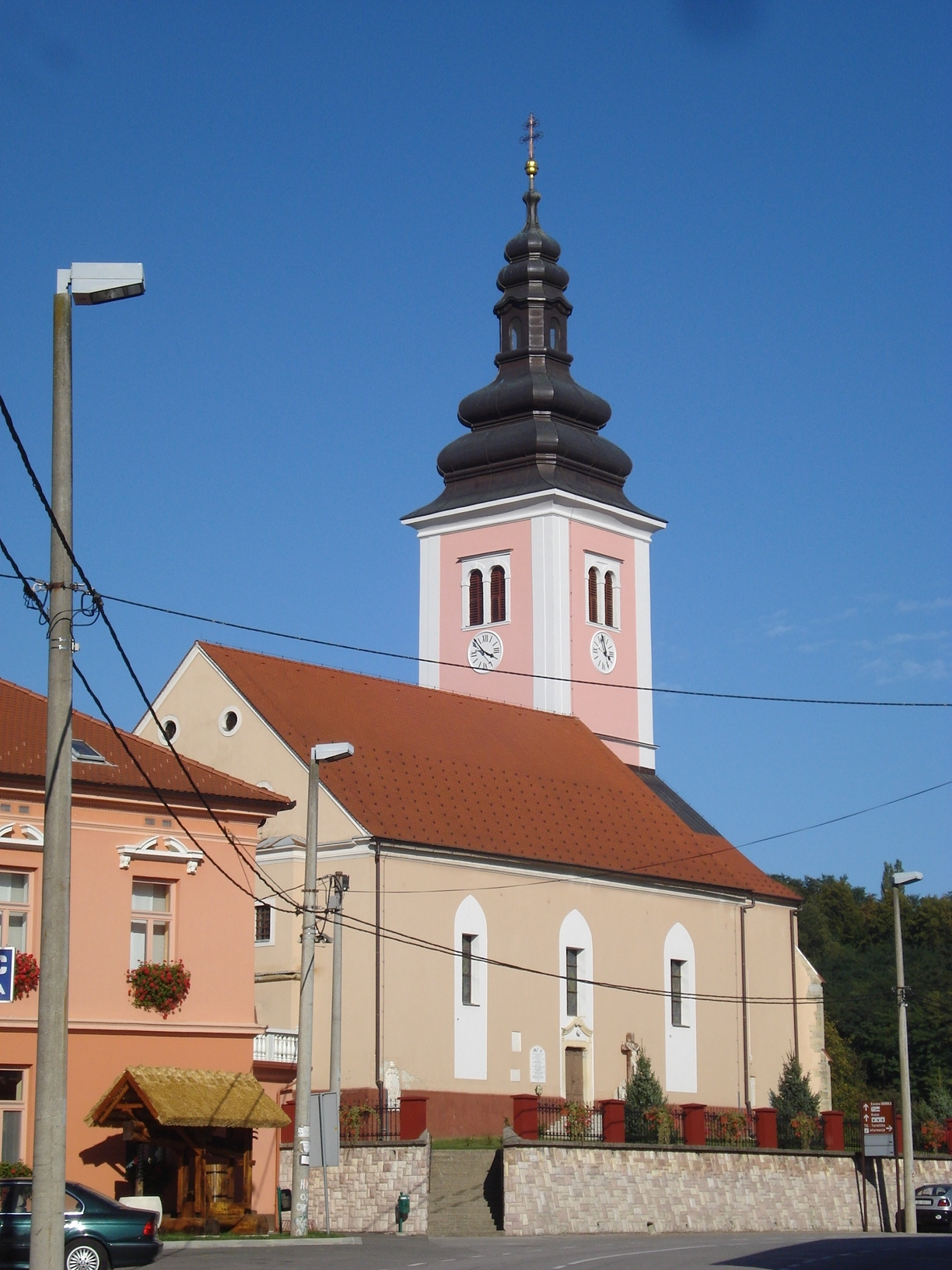
Štrigova, on the D227 road route

D227 is a state road in Međimurje region of Croatia connecting Štrigova to D209 state road in Šenkovec near Čakovec. The northern terminus of the road is located at Banfi border crossing, providing access to Slovenian town of Ljutomer. The road is 19.4 km (12.1 mi) long. The road, as well as all other state roads in Croatia, is managed and maintained by Hrvatske ceste, state owned company.

== Road junctions and populated areas ==
D227 junctions/populated areas
Type	Slip roads/Notes
	Banfi border crossing to Slovenia. Slovenian route 727 to Razkrižje, Slovenia. Slovenian route 231 to Ljutomer, Slovenia. The northern terminus of the road.
	Banfi
	Štrigova; Ž2007 to Sveti Urban. Ž2002 to Jalšovec.
	Grabrovnik
	Železna Gora
	Ž2009 to Gornji Mihaljevec, Macinec and D208 state road.
	Prekopa; Ž2006 to Selnica and Mursko Središće (D209).
	Vukanovec
	Dragoslavec
	Pleškovec; Ž2253 to Zebanec Selo.
	Vučetinec; Ž2012 to Okrugli Vrh. Ž2014 to Vučetinec.
	Lopatinec; Ž2254 to Gornji Mihaljevec.
	Brezje; Ž2015 to Mali Mihaljevec (to the north) and Nedelišće (D3) (to the south).
	Šenkovec; D209 to Mursko Središće (to the north) and Čakovec (D3) (to the south). The southern terminus of the road.
