= Vratišinec =

- Municipality
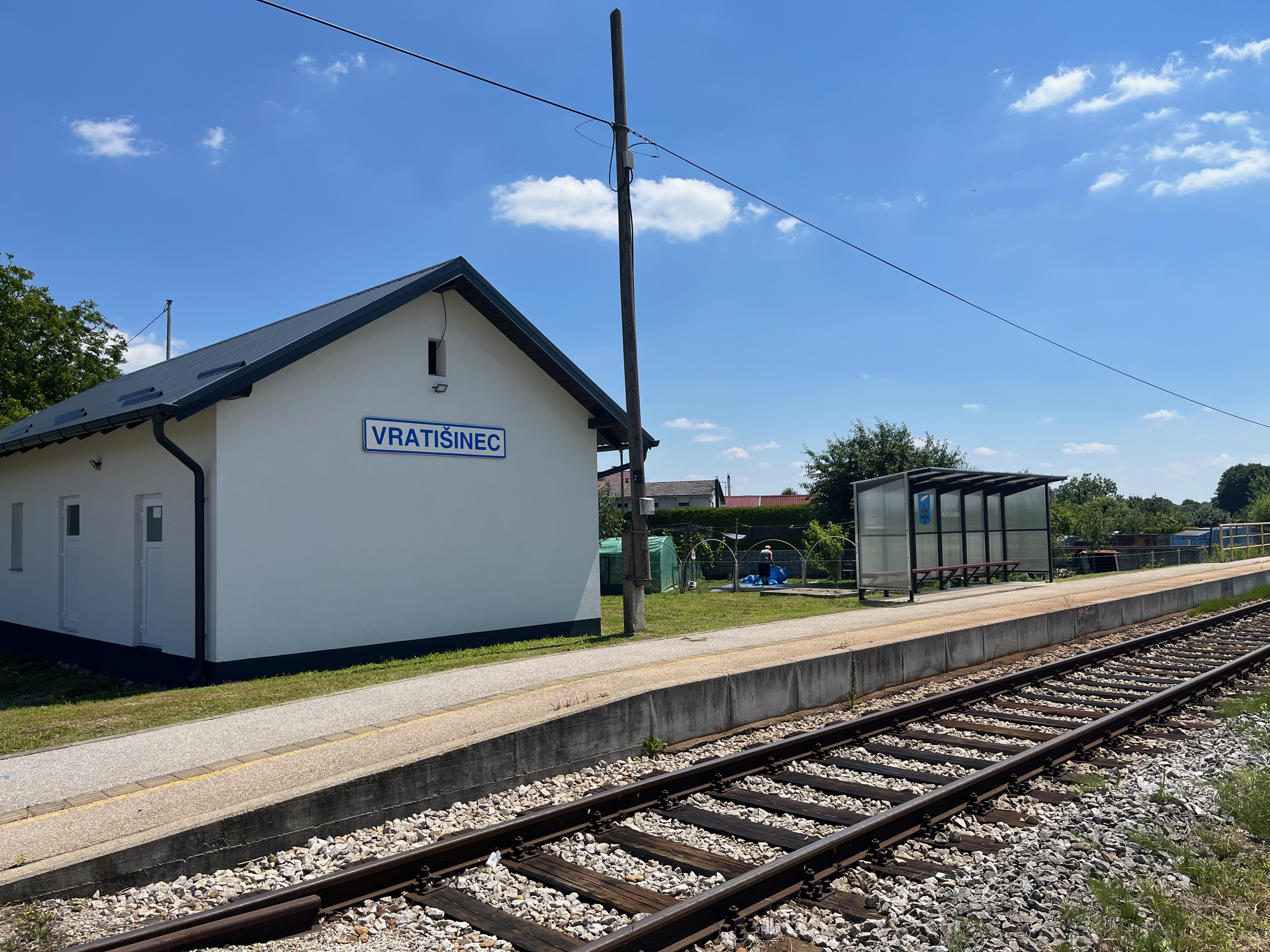
- Vratišinec train station

- Location within Croatia
- Coordinates: 46°28′53″N 16°27′28″E
- Country: Croatia
- Region: Northern Croatia (Međimurje)
- County: Međimurje County

Government
  - Municipal mayor: Mihael Grbavec (HNS)

Area
  - Municipality: 16.3 km^{2} (6.3 sq mi)
  - Urban: 7.3 km^{2} (2.8 sq mi)

Population (2021)
  - Municipality: 1,673
  - Density: 103/km^{2} (266/sq mi)
  - Urban: 1,155
  - Urban density: 160/km^{2} (410/sq mi)
- Time zone: UTC+1 (CET)
  - Summer (DST): UTC+2 (CEST)
- Postal code: 40315 Mursko Središće
- Area code: 040
- Website: vratisinec.hr

Vratišinec (Hungarian: Murasiklós) is a municipality and village in Međimurje County, Croatia.

== History ==
Vratišinec was first mentioned in 1458 as Bratrvsincz, and was originally an estate belonging to the Counts of Celje. In 1478, it was mentioned as Bratischinecz. It was also mentioned as Wratissnicz in 1636, and as Vratissinecz in 1752. The toponym is believed to have been derived from the male given name Bratiša or Vratiša, which is derived from brat, the Croatian word for "brother". It was most likely the name of a local feudal landlord.

By the 18th century, there was a wooden chapel in the village. Around 1760, the local people built a new brick chapel to replace it. At the time, the village was part of the Selnica parish. On 1 November 1789, the Vratišinec parish was established and the chapel became its parish church. The parish is named after the Exaltation of the Holy Cross.

By the beginning of the 20th century, the village was already predominantly populated by Croats. In the 1910 census, it had a population of 646. It was part of the Čakovec district (Hungarian: Csáktornyai járás) of Zala County in the Kingdom of Hungary until 1918 when Međimurje was annexed by the Kingdom of Yugoslavia.

In 1941, the village became a part of Hungary again, as the entire Međimurje region was occupied by the Hungarians until 1945. After World War II, it became a part of Croatia within the Federal People's Republic of Yugoslavia and belonged to the Čakovec municipality until 1992.

Following the independence of Croatia, the village of Vratišinec became the seat of a separate municipality, which was established in 1992. The municipality was reorganised in January 1997, with the villages of Peklenica and Križovec separating from it to become part of the wider area of the town of Mursko Središće, while Krištanovec and Žiškovec did the same to become part of the wider area of the city of Čakovec. After the reorganisation, the Vratišinec municipality includes the villages of Vratišinec and Gornji Kraljevec, and the hamlet of Remis.

In 2008, the municipality unveiled a monument to the post-World War II victims of the communist regime in Yugoslavia, as well as the local people who died defending Croatia during the Croatian War of Independence.

== Geography ==
The Municipality of Vratišinec is located in the northern part of Međimurje County and borders the City of Čakovec to the south, the Town of Mursko Središće to the west and north, and the Municipality of Podturen to the east. The municipality also includes the village of Gornji Kraljevec and the hamlet of Remis, located between the village of Gornji Kraljevec and Sivica.

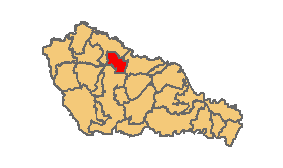
Location within Međimurje County

The railroad connecting Čakovec with Mursko Središće and Lendava goes through the municipality, with a small railway station located in the village of Vratišinec.

== Demographics ==
In the 2021 census, the municipality had a population of 1,673 in the following settlements:

- Gornji Kraljevec, population 518
- Vratišinec, population 1,155

The majority of inhabitants are Croats making up 97.07% of the population.

Vratišinec: Population trends 1857–2021
v

population	722	791	955	1025	1156	1208	1315	1689	2049	2098	2177	2271	2336	2394	2213	1984	1673
	1857	1869	1880	1890	1900	1910	1921	1931	1948	1953	1961	1971	1981	1991	2001	2011	2021

Sources: Croatian Bureau of Statistics publications

== Administration ==
The current mayor of Vratišinec is Mihael Grbavec (HNS) and the Vratišinec Municipal Council consists of 9 seats.

Groups	Councilors per group
HNS	6 / 9
SDP	2 / 9
NPS	1 / 9

== Notable people ==
- Vinko Žganec (1890–1976), a Croatian ethnomusicologist, was born in Vratišinec.
