= Žiškovec =

- Village
- Location within Croatia
- Coordinates: 46°26′56″N 16°26′02″E
- Country: Croatia
- County: Međimurje County
- Municipality: Čakovec

Area
  - Total: 2.5 km^{2} (0.97 sq mi)

Population (2021)
  - Total: 470
  - Density: 190/km^{2} (490/sq mi)
- Time zone: UTC+1 (CET)
  - Summer (DST): UTC+2 (CEST)
- Postal code: 40000 Čakovec
- Area code: 040

Žiškovec (Hungarian: Zsidény) is a village in Međimurje County, Croatia.

The village is administratively part of the wider area of Čakovec, the county seat of Međimurje County, and is located around 7 kilometres north of the centre of the city. Between 1992 and 1997, it was part of the Vratišinec municipality. The population of Žiškovec in the 2011 census was 543.

The southern end of Žiškovec is connected with the northern end of Slemenice. The D209 state road goes through both villages, connecting Čakovec with Mursko Središće and Lendava.
