= Slemenice =

- Village
- Location within Croatia
- Coordinates: 46°26′28″N 16°25′48″E
- Country: Croatia
- County: Međimurje County
- Municipality: Čakovec

Area
  - Total: 1.1 km^{2} (0.42 sq mi)

Population (2021)
  - Total: 215
  - Density: 200/km^{2} (510/sq mi)
- Time zone: UTC+1 (CET)
  - Summer (DST): UTC+2 (CEST)
- Postal code: 40000 Čakovec
- Area code: 040

Slemenice is a village in Međimurje County, Croatia.

The village is administratively part of the wider area of Čakovec, the county seat of Međimurje County, and is located around 6 kilometres north of the centre of the city. Its population in the 2011 census was 244.

The northern end of Slemenice is connected with the southern end of Žiškovec. The D209 state road goes through both villages, connecting Čakovec with Mursko Središće and Lendava.
