= Novo Selo Rok =

- Village
- Location within Croatia
- Coordinates: 46°25′40″N 16°28′18″E
- Country: Croatia
- County: Međimurje County
- Municipality: Čakovec

Area
  - Total: 9.7 km^{2} (3.7 sq mi)

Population (2021)
  - Total: 1,320
  - Density: 140/km^{2} (350/sq mi)
- Time zone: UTC+1 (CET)
  - Summer (DST): UTC+2 (CEST)
- Postal code: 40000 Čakovec
- Area code: 040

Novo Selo Rok (Hungarian: Rókusújfalu) is a village in Međimurje County, Croatia. The etymology of the village comes from Slavic languages meaning new village, Novo Selo.

The village is administratively part of the broader area of Čakovec, the county seat of Međimurje County, and is located around 4 kilometres from the centre of the city. Its population in the 2011 census was 1,441.

== History ==
The history of the village began in 1681, during an epidemic of plague, which devastated the entire Međimurje region. The faithful people fled to the protection of Saint Roch, building a chapel on the then deserted hill and naming it in his honour in 1686. The chapel was expanded during the 1750s.

In the 1857 census, the village had a population of 168. At the time, it was known as Jánosfalu in Hungarian, while its Croatian name was Janko Selo. By the 1910s, it was predominantly populated by Croats and had a population of 498 in the 1910 census.

It was part of the Čakovec district (Hungarian: Csáktornyai járás) of Zala County in the Kingdom of Hungary. In 1920, when the Treaty of Trianon was signed, the village became part of the Kingdom of Yugoslavia. Its official name in the censuses between 1921 and 1948 was Novo Selo. In 1941, it became part of Hungary again, as the entire Međimurje region was annexed by the Hungarians until 1945. After World War II, it became part of Croatia within the Federal People's Republic of Yugoslavia.

The name Novo Selo-Rok was first mentioned as the official name of the village in the 1953 census, while the hyphen was first removed from the name in the 1981 census. By the 1960s, the population of the village grew to over 1,000.

== Transportation ==
There is a small train station in the western part of the village, on the railroad that connects Čakovec with Mursko Središće and Lendava. The main road going through the village connects Čakovec with Podturen.
