= Mačkovec, Croatia =

Mačkovec
- Village
- Location within Croatia
- Coordinates: 46°25′26″N 16°26′02″E
- Country: Croatia
- County: Međimurje County
- Municipality: Čakovec
- Founded: 1367

Area
  - Total: 4.3 km^{2} (1.7 sq mi)
- Elevation: 198 m (650 ft)

Population (2021)
  - Total: 1,222
  - Density: 280/km^{2} (740/sq mi)
- Time zone: UTC+1 (CET)
  - Summer (DST): UTC+2 (CEST)
- Postal code: 40000 Čakovec
- Area code: (+385) 040
- Vehicle registration: ČK

Mačkovec (Hungarian: Nyírvölgy) is a village in Međimurje County, Croatia. It had a population of 1,326 in the 2011 census.

The village is located approximately 3 kilometres from the centre of Čakovec, the county seat and largest city of Međimurje County, and administratively belongs to the city's wider area. Its southern end is connected with the north-eastern part of Šenkovec.

The D209 road goes through the north-western part of the village, connecting Čakovec with Mursko Središće and Lendava.
