= Gornji Kraljevec =

Gornji Kraljevec may refer to:

- Gornji Kraljevec, Međimurje County, a village near Vratišinec
- Gornji Kraljevec, Krapina-Zagorje County, a village near Hrašćina
