= Vinko Kos =

Croatian author, poet

- Born: Vinko Kos; 10 July 1914; Vučetinec, Sveti Juraj na Bregu
- Died: May 1945 (aged 31); Zagreb
- Occupations: author, poet, child writer
- Spouse: Marija Petreé D' Artagnan (1941–1945; his death)
- Children: Lada Kos; Vera Kos-Paliska
- Writing career
- Language: Croatian
- Period: 1939–1945
- Notable awards: The City of Zagreb Award, 1945

Vinko Kos (10 July 1914 – May 1945) was a Croatian author, poet and children's writer.

== Biography ==
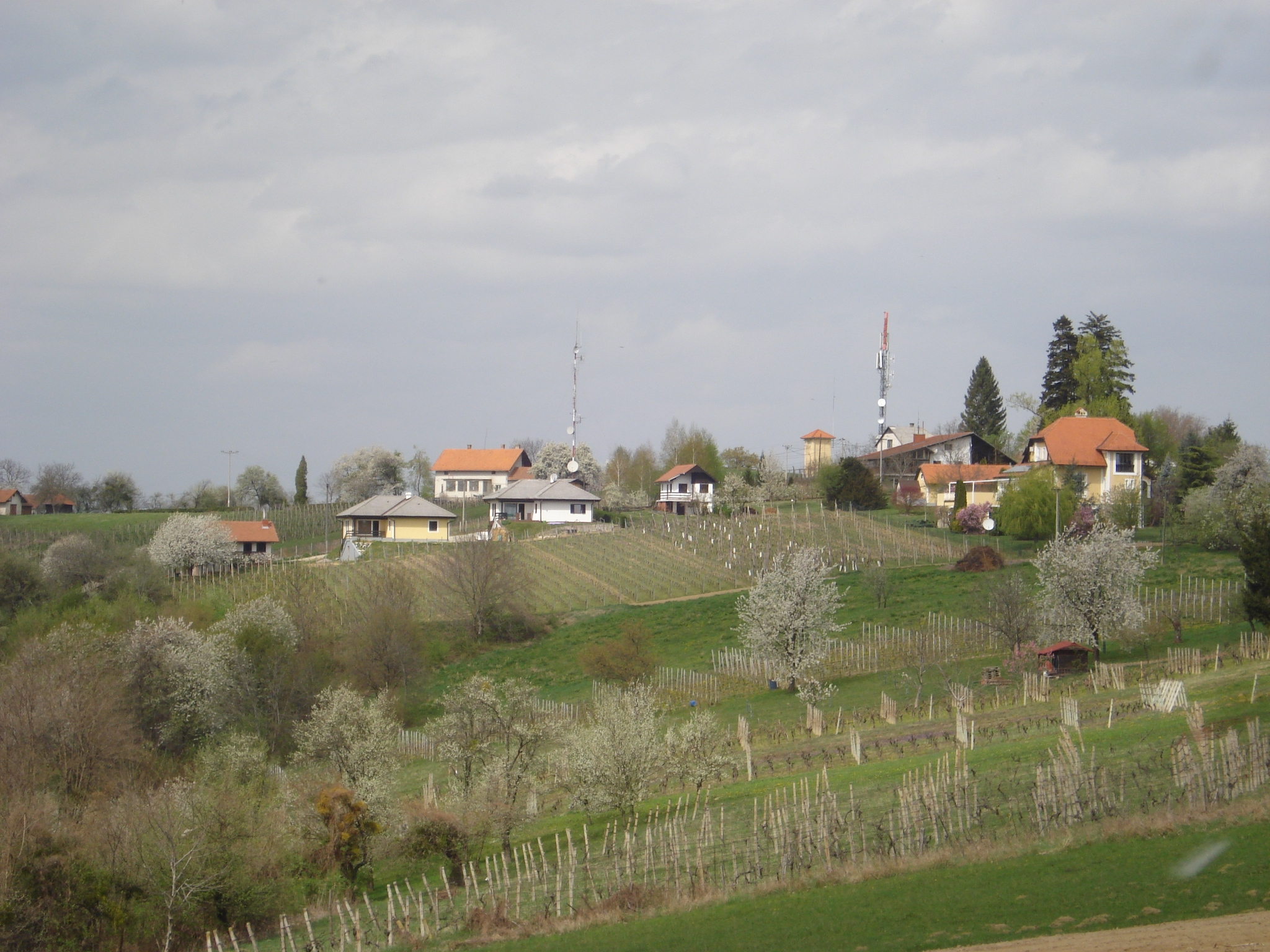
Vučetinec, his birthplace

Vinko Kos was born in Vučetinec, a village in the parish of Sveti Juraj na Bregu in the Austro-Hungarian Kingdom of Croatia-Slavonia on 10 July 1914, to Petar Kos and his wife Ana (née Bistrović). Vinko's mother died in 1942 of tuberculosis and his father died in 1945.

He went to primary school to his village and continued his schooling thanks to Stjepan Horvat, a poet from Sveti Juraj na Bregu. Horvat helped him because Vinko was talented, but also very poor. Kos attended Varaždin Franciscan Gymnasium and Diocesan Seminary in Škofja Loka. He studied Croatian and German studies at the Faculty of Philosophy, University of Zagreb.

He leaves studies in 1936 and in 1937 starts writing for newspaper such as Luč, Hrvatska prosvjeta, Hrvatska revija, Hrvatska straža, Hrvatsko jedinstvo, Obitelj, Glasnik sv. Ante, Hrvatska smotra, Hrvatski ženski list, Omladina, Seljačka omladina, Jutarnji list, Morgenblatt, Plava revija, Danica, Hrvatska mladost, Hrvatska misao, Hrvatski godišnjak and many others.

With the collections of poems Vodopad ("Waterfall", 1939), Kipar ("Sculptor", 1941) and the poem Šišmiš ("Bat", 1943), he gained a reputation as a meditative and mystical poet. He also published the Kajkavian collection Lada (1944), inspired by the native landscape. He wrote poems (some of which were composed), stories and plays for children under the pseudonyms Čika Niko and Čiča Niko. Children's plays, radio dramas, novellas and travelogues were found in his legacy.

Kos was associate of Blessed Alojzije Stepinac. On his suggestion, Kos opened Dječji grad ("Children's town"), an educational institution for pre-school children. In 1945, Kos left Zagreb in the Independent State of Croatia evacuation to Austria.

Kos was killed by Tito's partisans when they liberated Zagreb at the end of World War II.

== List of works ==
- Vodopad (1939)
- Kipar (1941)
- Božićne zvjezdice (1941)
- Zlatna jabuka (1942)
- Dušenka (1943)
- Šišmiš (1943)
- Divlji dječak (1943)
- Lada (1944) - Winner of The City of Zagreb Award in 1945
- Planinski dječak (1945)
- Zlatni orasi (published after his death in Toronto in 1967, by Lucijan Kordić)
- Sabrana djela 1-2 (Čakovec, 1997)

=== Composed songs ===
- Dom ("Home", Jakov Gotovac)
- Mura voda teče ("Mura water flows", Krsto Odak)
- Cmreki v snegu spiju (I. Sokač)
- Ljubav ("Love", Lada Kos)
- Veter ("Wind", Lada Kos)
