= Gornji Kraljevec, Međimurje County =

Gornji Kraljevec
- Village
- Location within Croatia
- Coordinates: 46°28′01″N 16°28′16″E
- Country: Croatia
- County: Međimurje County
- Municipality: Vratišinec

Area
  - Total: 9.0 km^{2} (3.5 sq mi)

Population (2021)
  - Total: 518
  - Density: 58/km^{2} (150/sq mi)
- Time zone: UTC+1 (CET)
  - Summer (DST): UTC+2 (CEST)
- Postal code: 40316 Vratišinec
- Area code: 040

Gornji Kraljevec (Hungarian: Felsőkirályfalva) is a village in Međimurje County, Croatia.

The village is part of the Vratišinec municipality. It is located in the northern part of Međimurje County, around 10 kilometres from the centre of Čakovec, the county seat. It is mainly surrounded by agricultural fields, with other nearby villages including Krištanovec and Sivica.

The population of Gornji Kraljevec in the 2011 census was 592. It also includes the population of the hamlet of Remis, located approximately a kilometre outside Gornji Kraljevec, on the road connecting the village with Sivica.

== History ==
In 1478, the village was listed as Kralowecz in the list of settlements belonging to the Čakovec area. The local church was built in 1896.

In the 1910 census, the village had a population of 562. It was at the time already predominantly populated by Croats, with Hungarians being a significant minority. The village was part of the Čakovec district (Hungarian: Csáktornyai járás) in the Kingdom of Hungary until the Treaty of Trianon was signed in 1920. It then became part of the Kingdom of Yugoslavia. In the 1921 and 1931 censuses, the official name of the village was Kraljevec.

Between 1941 and 1945, it was part of Hungary again, as the entire Međimurje region was annexed by the Hungarians at the time. After World War II, it became part of Croatia within the Federal People's Republic of Yugoslavia.

Between the 1857 and 1921 censuses, Gornji Kraljevec also included the hamlet of Celine. After being a separate village for around 50 years, Celine again became a hamlet belonging to Gornji Kraljevec in the 1981 and 1991 censuses.

Following the independence of Croatia, Gornji Kraljevec became part of the Vratišinec municipality in 1992. At the same time, Celine became a separate village in the Podturen municipality.
