= Sveti Juraj na Bregu =

- Municipality
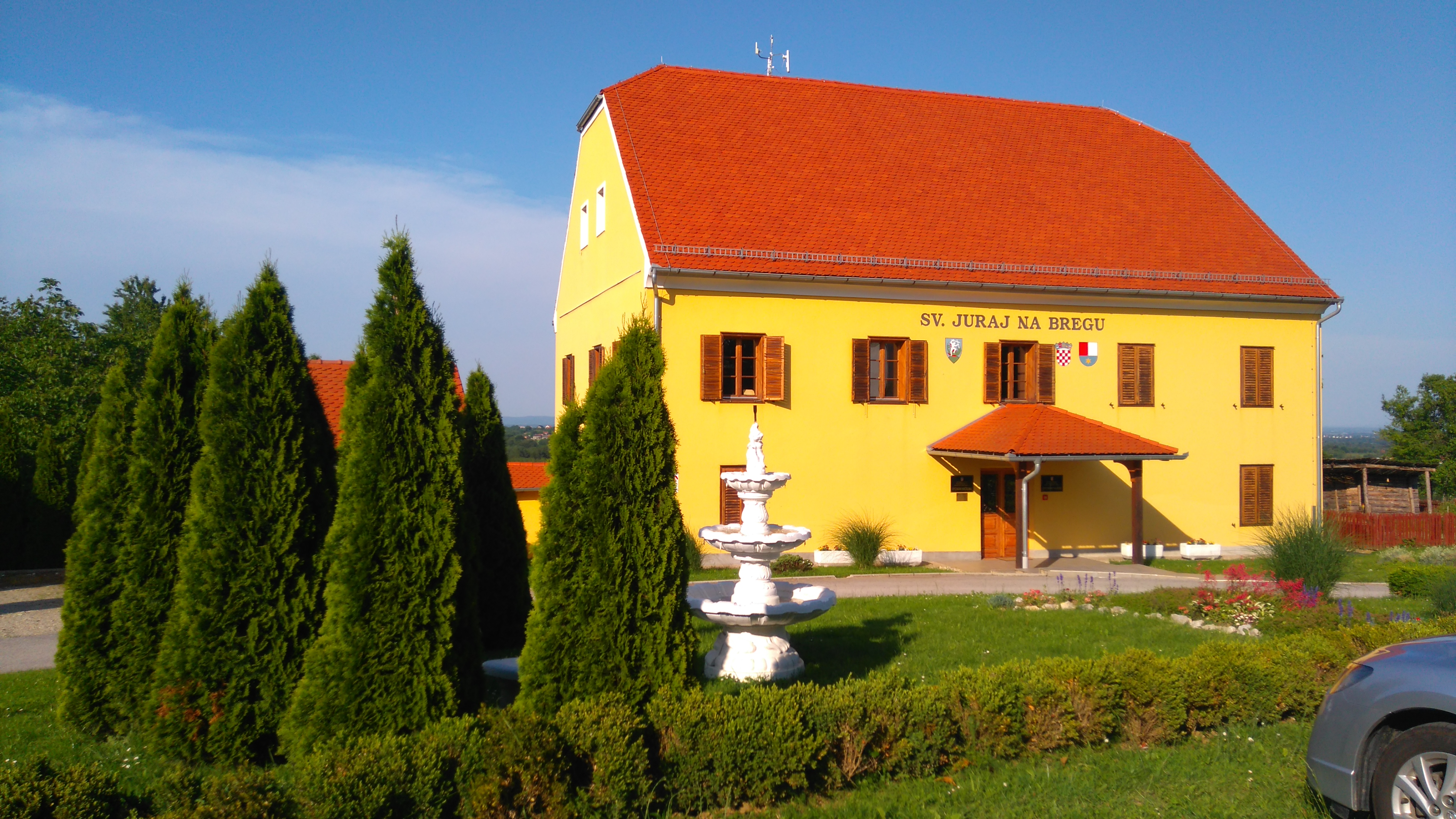
- Municipality centre

- Location within Croatia
- Coordinates: 46°25′59″N 16°22′59″E
- Country: Croatia
- Region: Northern Croatia (Međimurje)
- County: Međimurje County
- County Seat: Lopatinec

Government
  - Municipal mayor: Anđelko Nagrajsalović (SDP)

Area
  - Total: 30.1 km^{2} (11.6 sq mi)

Population (2021)
  - Total: 4,929
  - Density: 164/km^{2} (424/sq mi)
- Time zone: UTC+1 (CET)
  - Summer (DST): UTC+2 (CEST)
- Postal code: 40311 Lopatinec
- Area code: 040
- Website: svetijurajnabregu.hr

Sveti Juraj na Bregu (Hungarian: Víziszentgyörgy, German: St. Georg im Gebirge) is a municipality in Međimurje County, Croatia. The official seat of the municipality is Lopatinec.

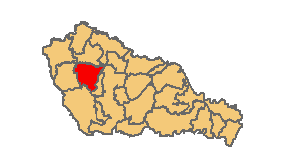
Location within Međimurje County

The main road going through the municipality connects Čakovec, the county seat of Međimurje County, with Štrigova and the Croatian-Slovenian border checkpoint in Razkrižje.

== Etymology ==
The municipality was named after Saint George, who is also depicted on its coat of arms. Its name means Saint George on the Hill in the local dialect.

== Demographics ==
In the 2021 census, the municipality had a population of 4,929 in the following settlements:

- Brezje, population 678
- Dragoslavec, population 351
- Frkanovec, population 301
- Lopatinec, population 906
- Mali Mihaljevec, population 433
- Okrugli Vrh, population 358
- Pleškovec, population 462
- Vučetinec, population 569
- Zasadbreg, population 871

The majority of inhabitants are Croats making up 98.72% of the population.

Sveti Juraj na Bregu: Population trends 1857–2021
v

population	1893	2297	2252	2582	2798	3090	3068	3662	4610	4744	4921	4871	4660	5012	5279	5090	4929
	1857	1869	1880	1890	1900	1910	1921	1931	1948	1953	1961	1971	1981	1991	2001	2011	2021

Sources: Croatian Bureau of Statistics publications

== Administration ==
The current mayor of Sveti Juraj na Bregu is Anđelko Nagrajsalović (SDP) and the Sveti Juraj na Bregu Municipal Council consists of 13 seats.

Groups	Councilors per group
SDP-HSS-MDS	8 / 13
NPS	3 / 13
HDZ	1 / 13
HNS	1 / 13

== Religion ==
The main church of the local parish sits atop of a hill and is one of the most prominent churches in the region, as it is also visible from the D3 state road. On June 4, 2008, it was heavily damaged when its bell tower collapsed during renovations, but has since been rebuilt.

== Gallery ==
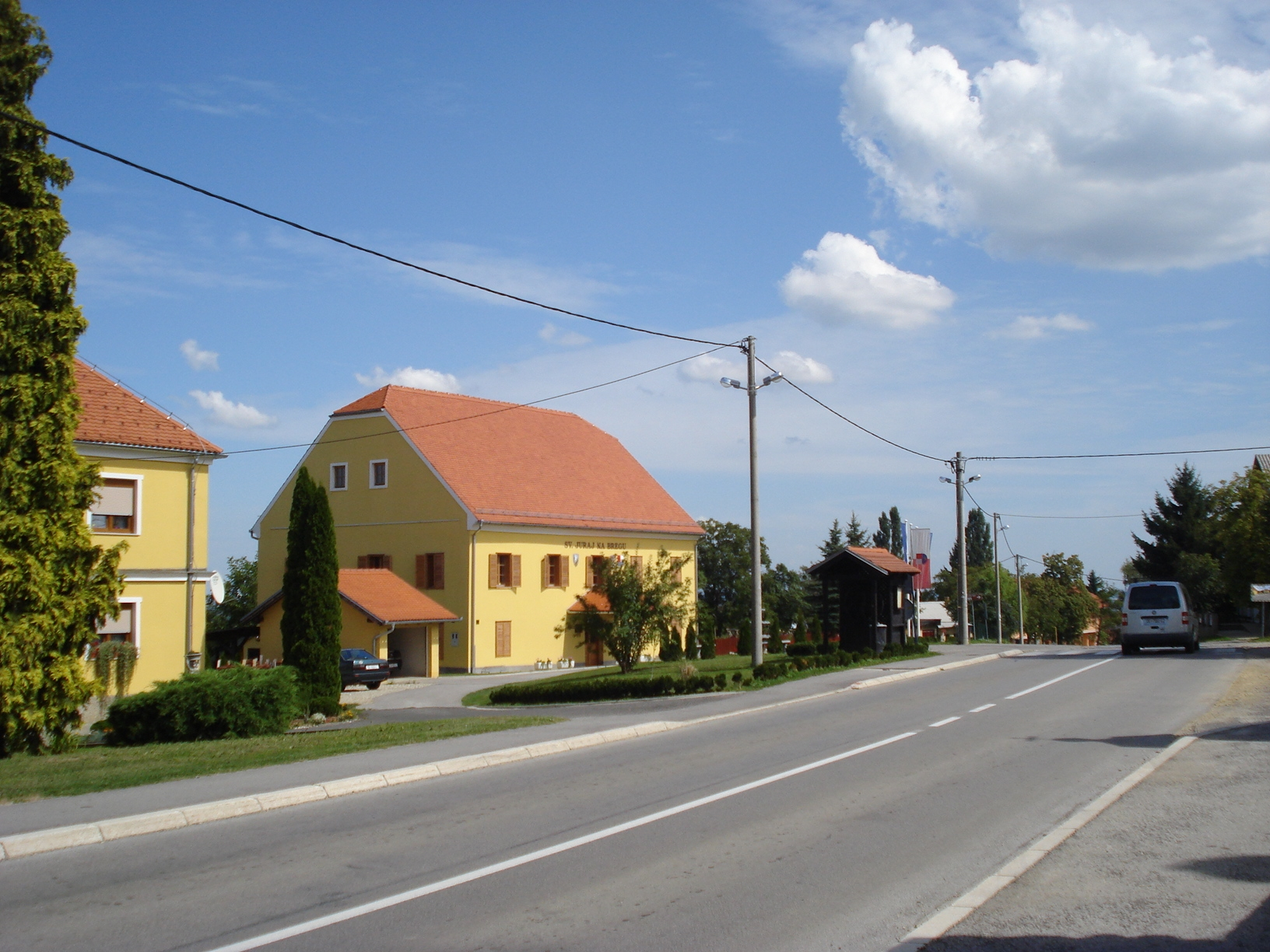
Ivan Goran Kovačić Street

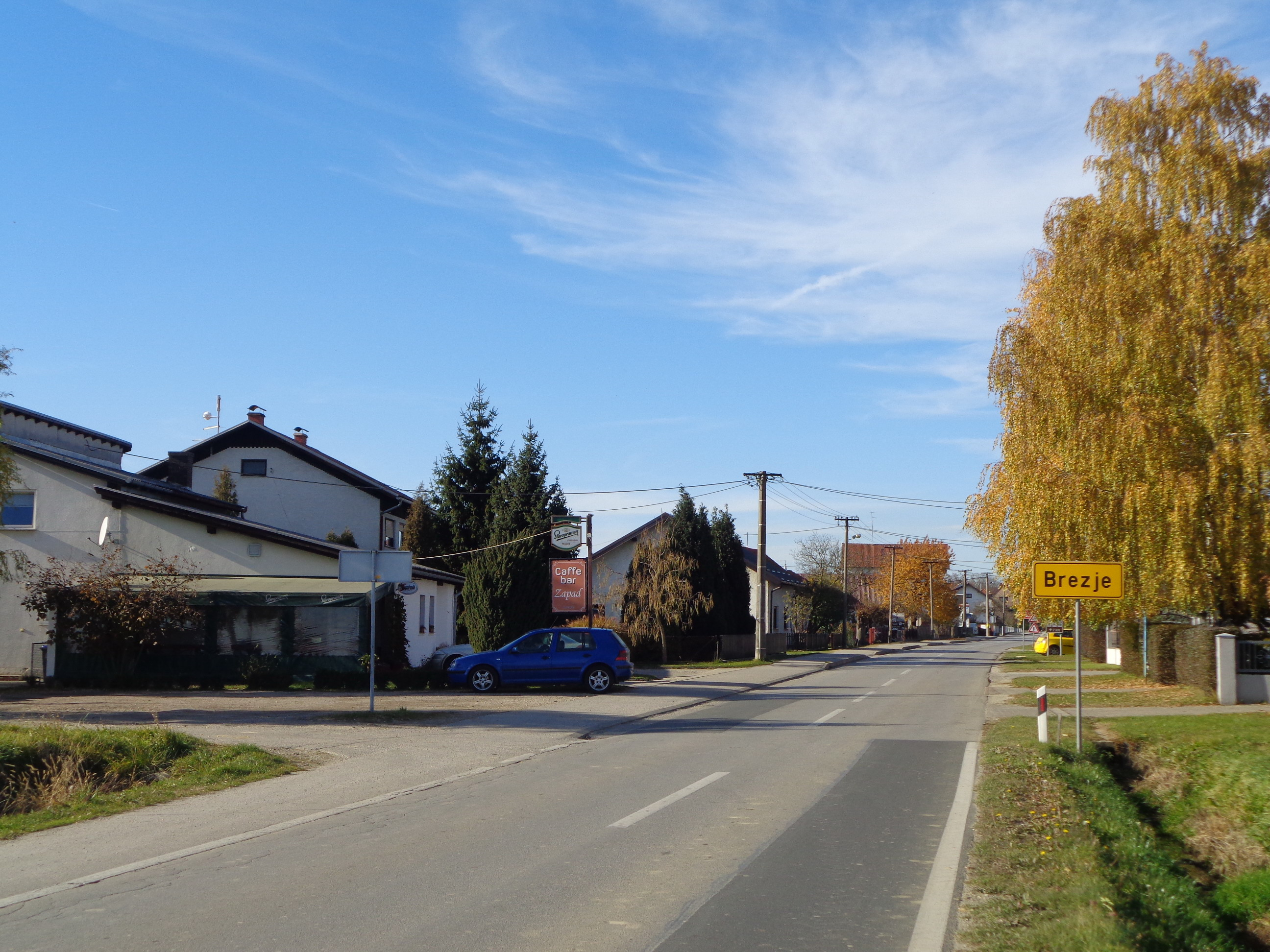
Brezje

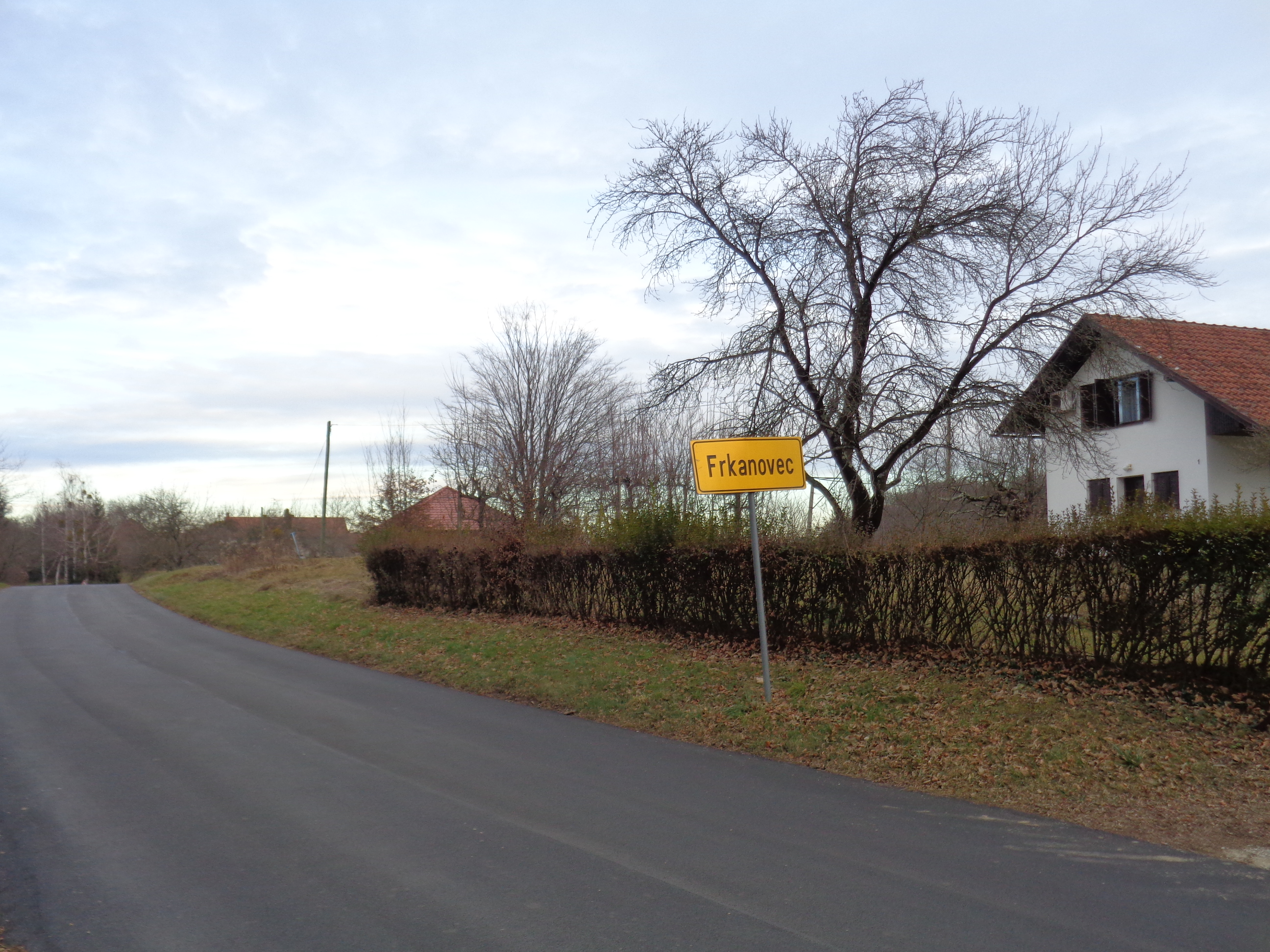
Frkanovec

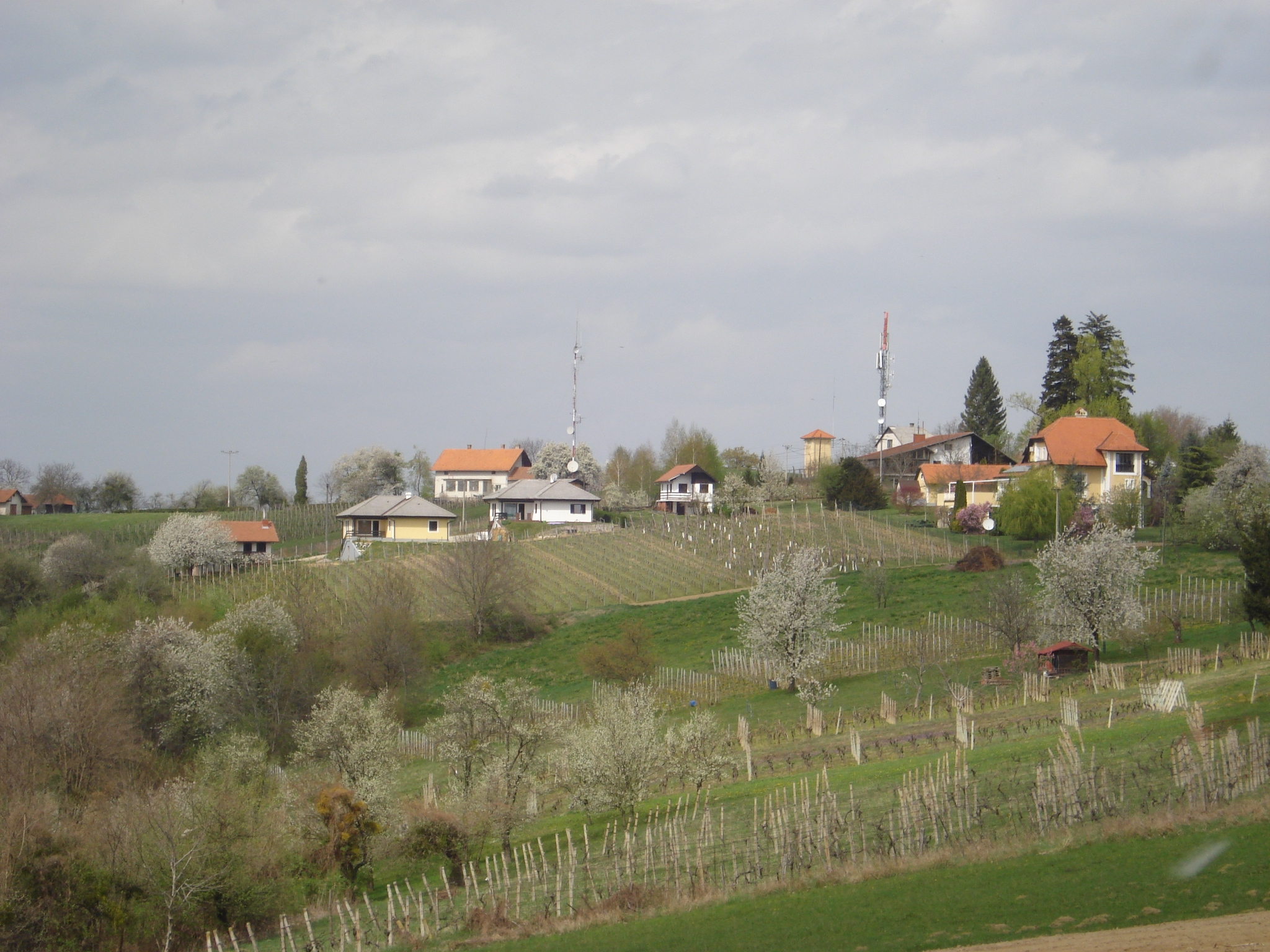
Vučetinec

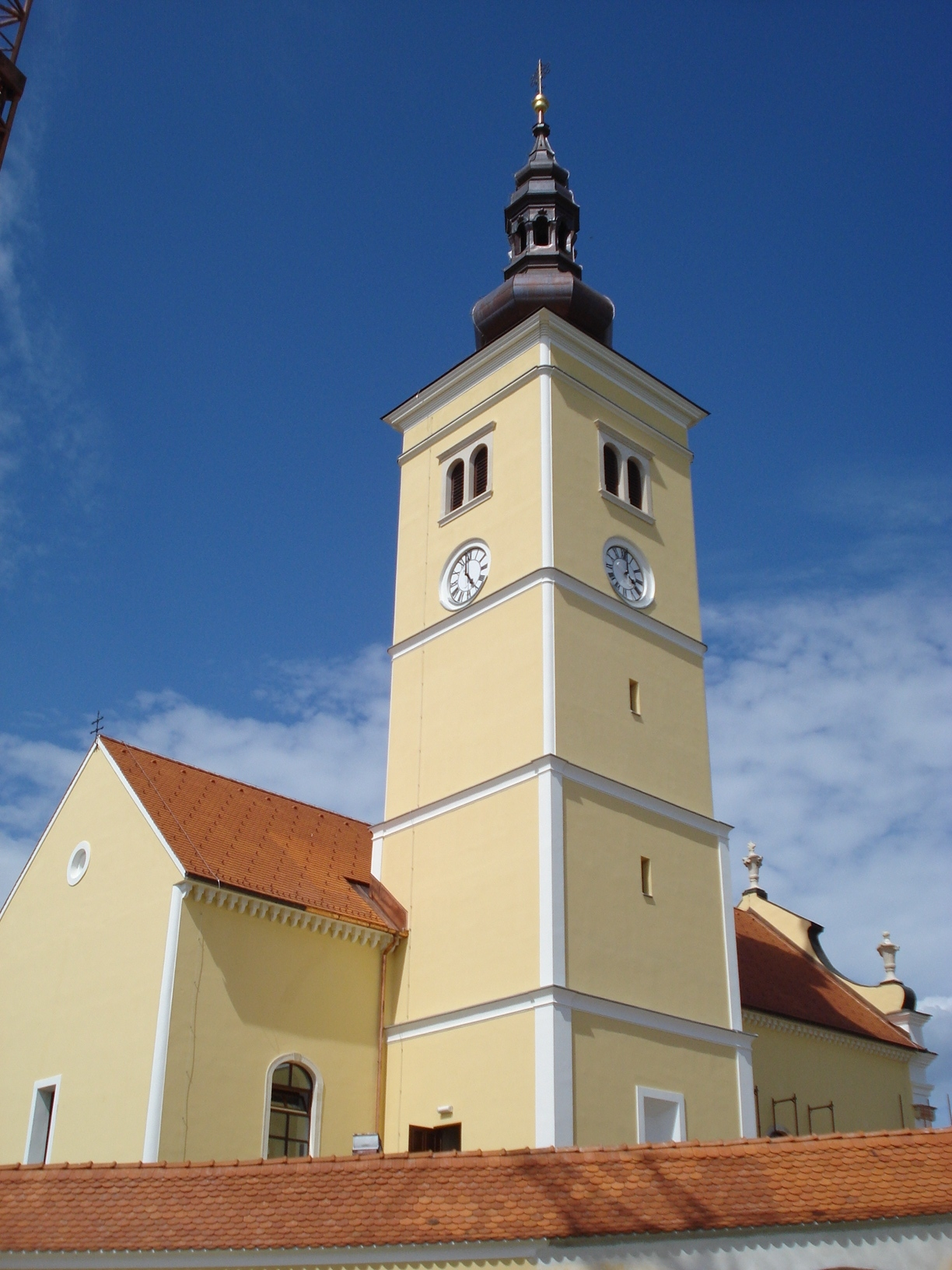
Church of Saint George

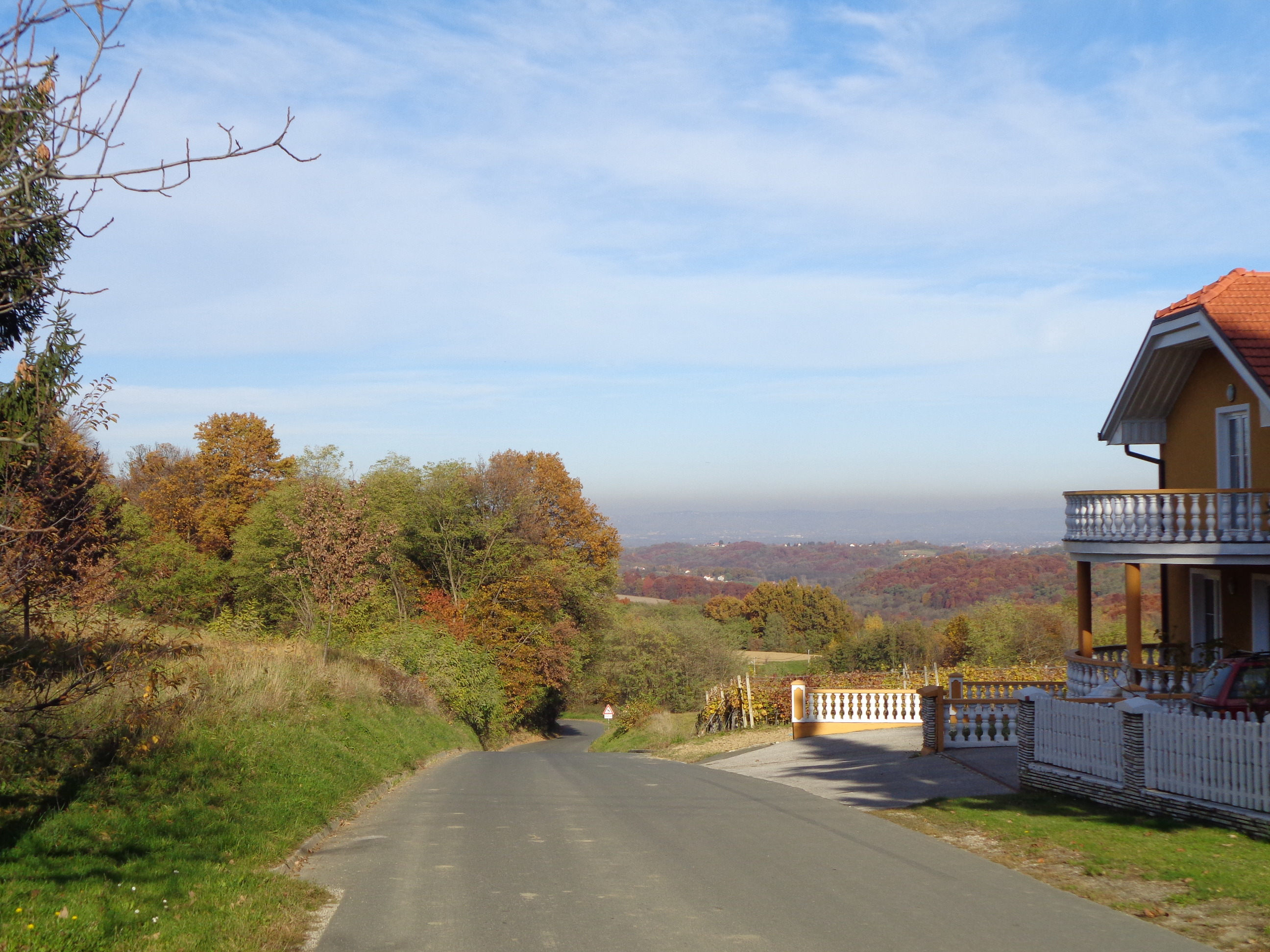
Pleškovec

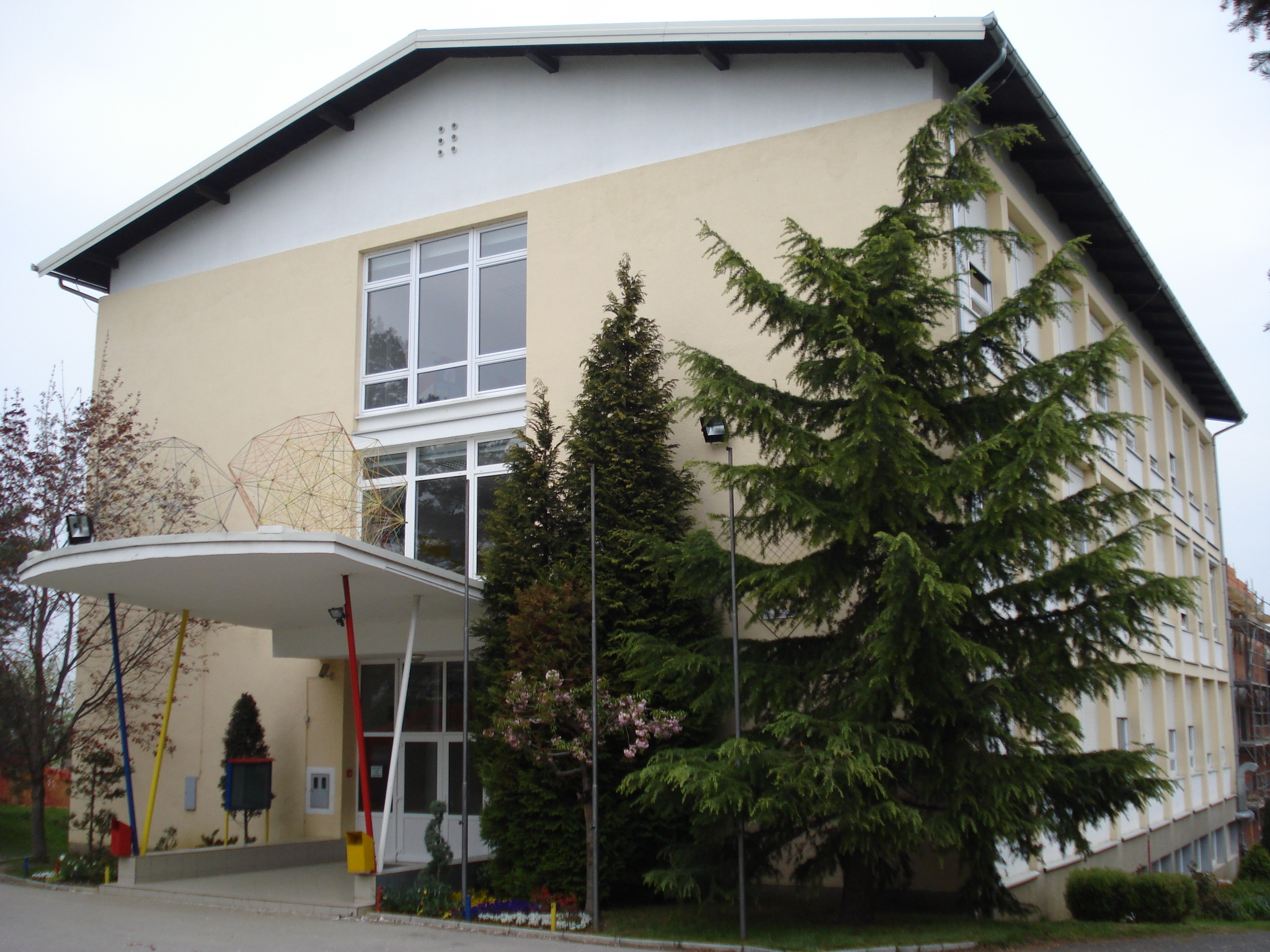
Elementary school

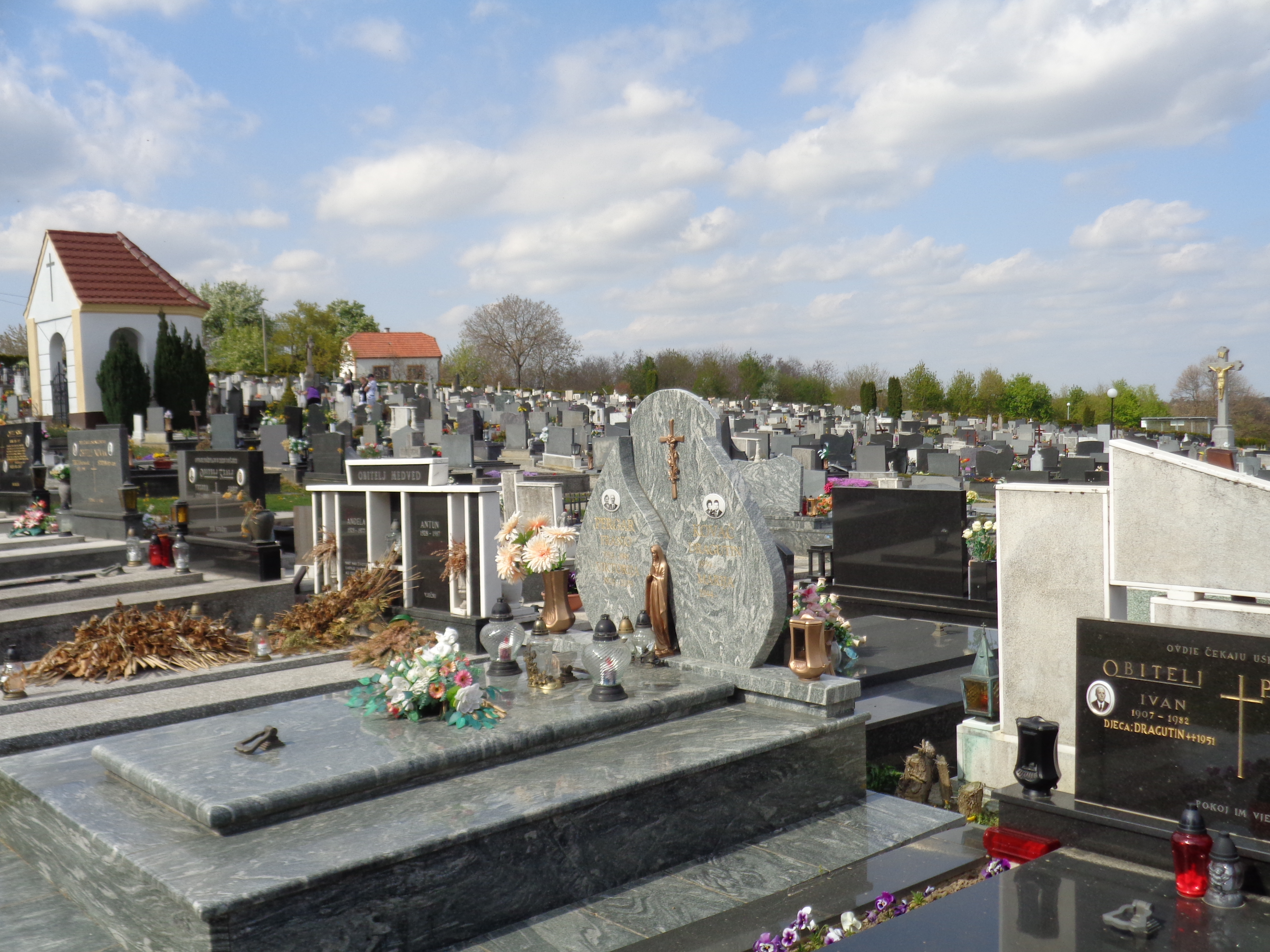
Lopatinec cemetery

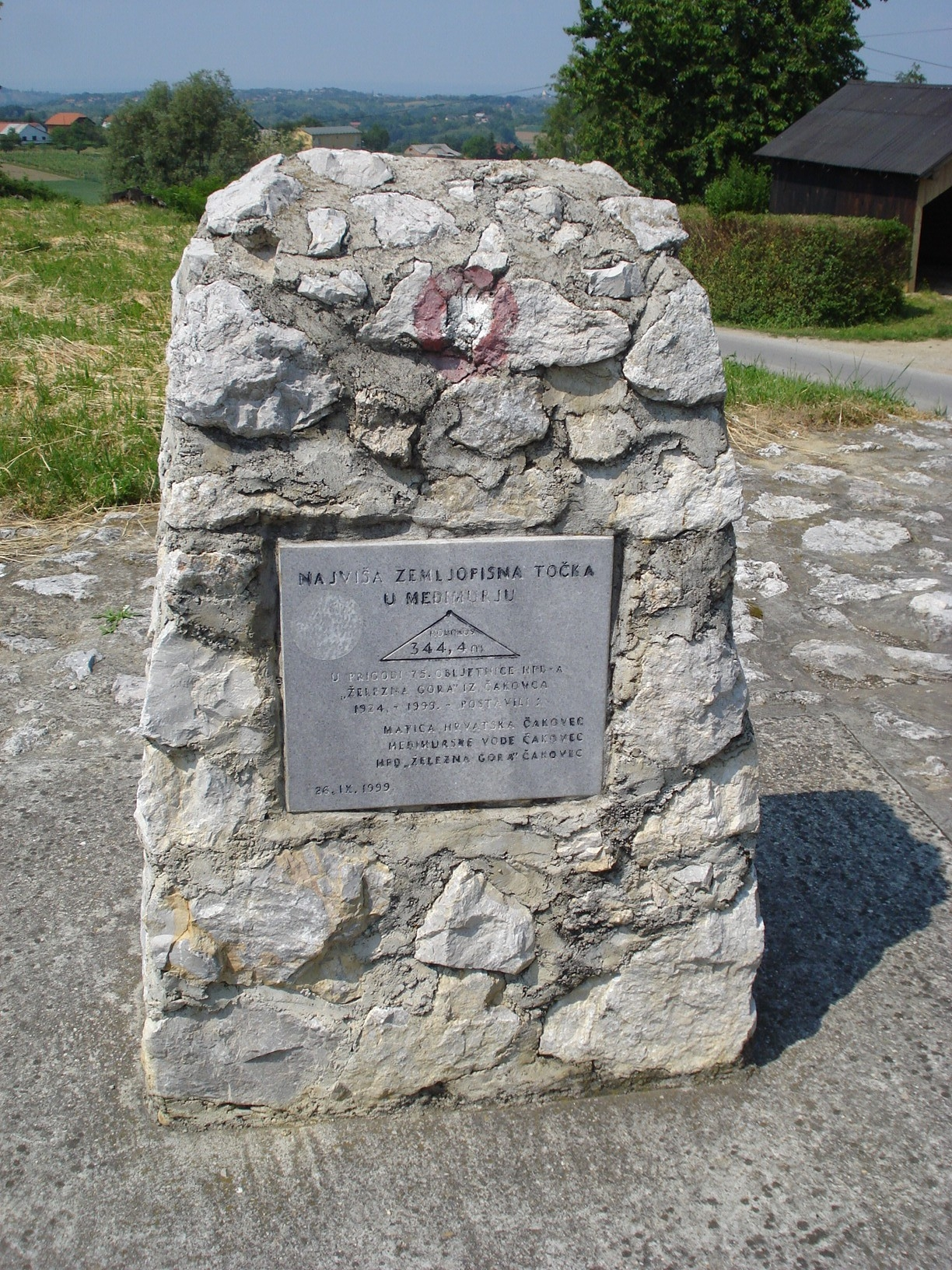
Mohokos peak

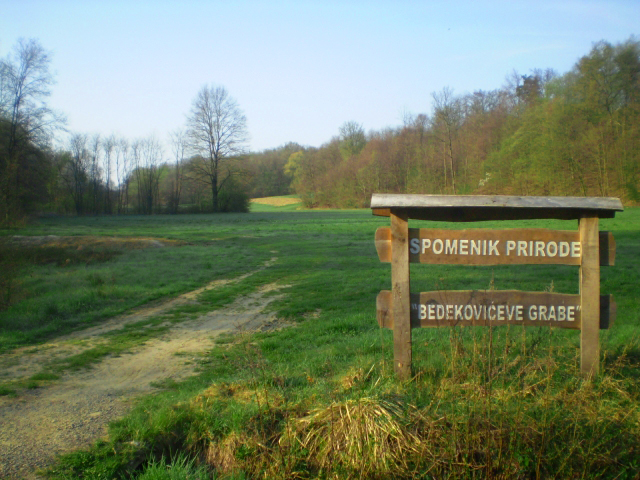
Bedekovićeve grabe natural monument

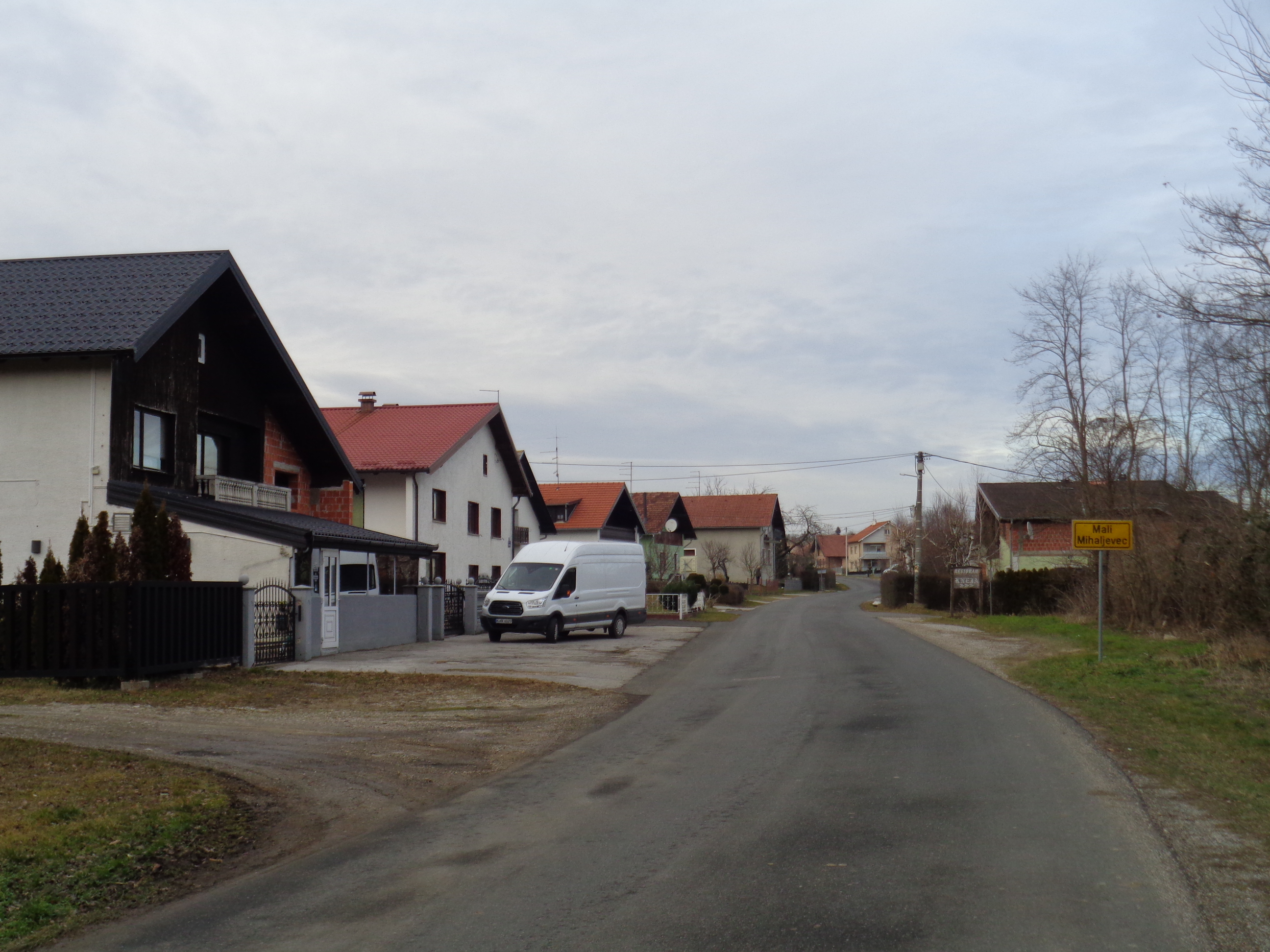
Mali Mihaljevec

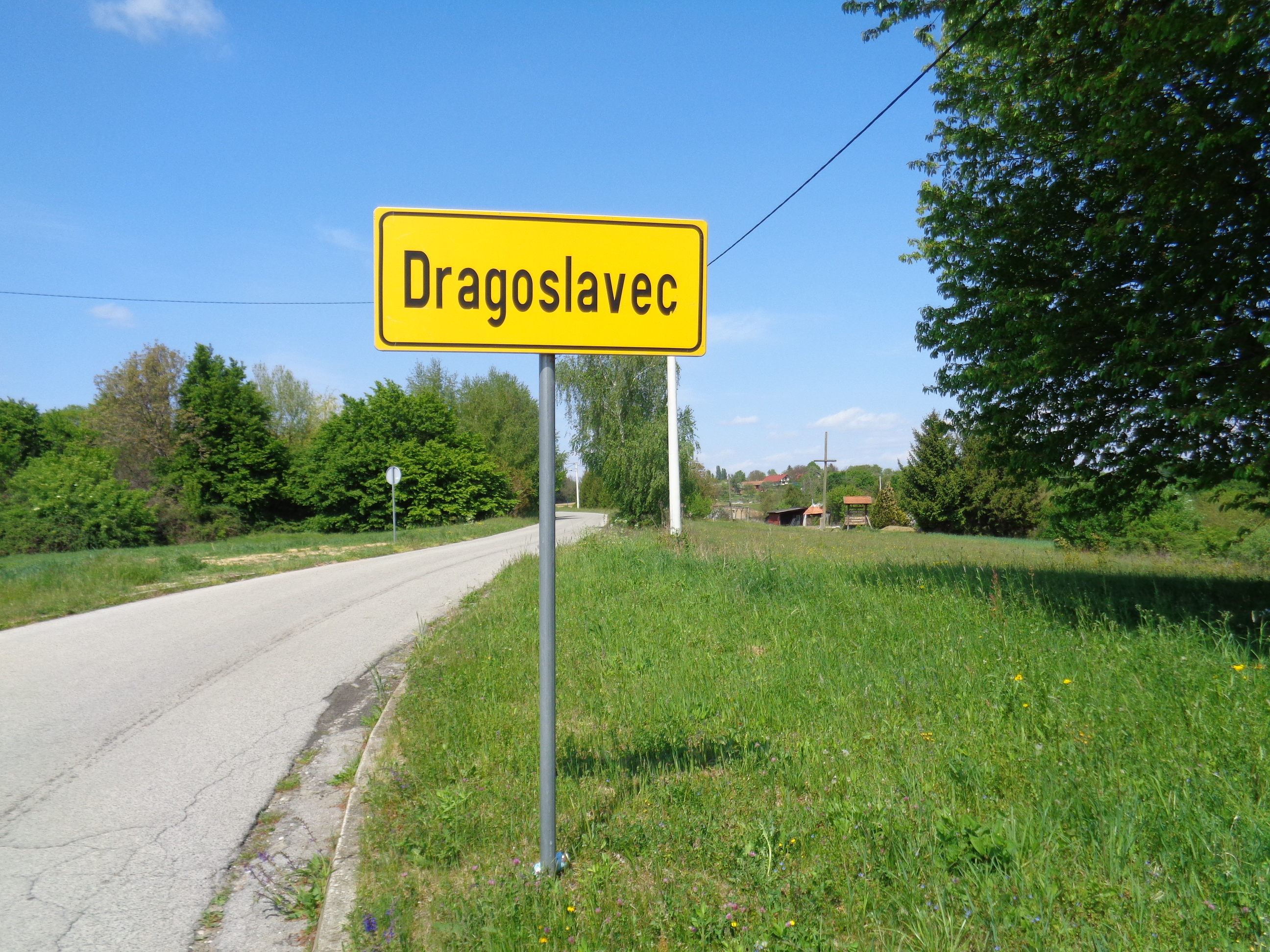
Dragoslavec

== Notable people ==
- Vinko Kos, Croatian author, poet and children's writer
