= Peklenica =

Peklenica Bányavár
- Village
- Location within Croatia
- Coordinates: 46°30′N 16°29′E
- Country: Croatia
- County: Međimurje County
- Municipality: Mursko Središće

Area
  - Total: 6.7 km^{2} (2.6 sq mi)

Population (2021)
  - Total: 1,072
  - Density: 160/km^{2} (410/sq mi)
- Time zone: UTC+1 (CET)
  - Summer (DST): UTC+2 (CEST)
- Postal code: 40315 Mursko Središće

Peklenica (Hungarian: Bányavár) is a village in Međimurje County, Croatia. It is located 3.1 km from Mursko Središće, 11 km from Čakovec, and is adjacent to Križovec and Vratišinec. As of the 2011 census, there were 1217 inhabitants.

Peklenica is known for its natural source of crude oil known to local population since at least the Middle Ages. The toponym, first recorded in 1391, is derived from words paklina or pekel, which is what the locals called the greasy substance they used for lubrication of horse-drawn carriages as well as for medicinal purposes. According to Ottoman explorer Evliya Çelebi's writings, the town of Szigetvár was burnt during the 1566 siege using oil from Peklenica.

The oil was first commercially exploited by count Georg Festetics in 1856, arguably predating the well-known Drake Well in Pennsylvania by three years. From the 1880s to the early 20th century, Viennese entrepreneur Wilhelm Singer drilled dozens of oil wells in the village. Due to diminishing returns, oil exploitation in Peklenica ended in 1967.

== Bibliography ==
- Gregorić, Marina; Siketić, Josipa; Horvat, Dajana Maria (December 2017). "Peklenica kao potencijalna turistička destinacija u Međimurju" (PDF). Zbornik radova Međimurskog veleučilišta u Čakovcu (in Croatian). 8 (2): 13–21.
