= Sivica =

- Village
- Location within Croatia
- Coordinates: 46°26′56″N 16°30′11″E
- Country: Croatia
- County: Međimurje County
- Municipality: Podturen

Area
  - Total: 7.5 km^{2} (2.9 sq mi)

Population (2021)
  - Total: 636
  - Density: 85/km^{2} (220/sq mi)
- Time zone: UTC+1 (CET)
  - Summer (DST): UTC+2 (CEST)
- Postal code: 40317 Podturen
- Area code: 040

Sivica (Hungarian: Muraszilvágy) is a village in Međimurje County, Croatia.

The village is part of the Podturen municipality and had a population of 681 in the 2011 census. It is located around 9 kilometres from the centre of Čakovec, the county seat of Međimurje County. The main road going through the village connects Čakovec with Podturen, which is located around 4 kilometres from Sivica.

The village is mainly surrounded by agricultural fields and some forests. The closest villages to Sivica include Celine, Gornji Kraljevec and Novo Selo Rok.
