= Štrukovec =

- Village
- Location within Croatia
- Coordinates: 46°28′26″N 16°25′41″E
- Country: Croatia
- County: Međimurje County
- Municipality: Mursko Središće

Area
  - Total: 4.4 km^{2} (1.7 sq mi)

Population (2021)
  - Total: 339
  - Density: 77/km^{2} (200/sq mi)
- Time zone: UTC+1 (CET)
  - Summer (DST): UTC+2 (CEST)
- Postal code: 40314 Selnica

Štrukovec (Hungarian: Muraréthát) is a village in Croatia. It is connected by the D209 highway.
