= Celine, Međimurje County =

Celine
- Village
- Location within Croatia
- Coordinates: 46°27′32″N 16°30′00″E
- Country: Croatia
- County: Međimurje County
- Municipality: Podturen

Area
  - Total: 0.9 km^{2} (0.35 sq mi)

Population (2021)
  - Total: 316
  - Density: 350/km^{2} (910/sq mi)
- Time zone: UTC+1 (CET)
  - Summer (DST): UTC+2 (CEST)
- Postal code: 40317 Podturen
- Area code: 040

Celine is a village in Međimurje County, Croatia.

The village is administratively part of the Podturen municipality. It is located around 10 kilometres from the centre of Čakovec, the county seat of Međimurje County, with the closest villages including Sivica and Ferketinec.

== History ==
Between the 1857 and 1921 censuses, Celine was a hamlet that was considered part of Gornji Kraljevec, which was part of the Čakovec district (Hungarian: Csáktornyai járás) of Zala County in the Kingdom of Hungary until 1920. It then became part of the Kingdom of Yugoslavia. Between 1941 and 1945, it was annexed to Hungary along with the rest of the Međimurje region. After World War II, it became part of Croatia within the Federal People's Republic of Yugoslavia.

Celine was considered a separate settlement in the censuses between 1931 and 1971, with its largest population in the period being 115 (in the 1953 census). It was again considered part of Gornji Kraljevec in the 1981 and 1991 censuses.

Following the independence of Croatia, Celine became a separate village in the Podturen municipality. A chapel was built in the village in 1999. The population of Celine in the 2001 census was 340.
