= Mohokos =

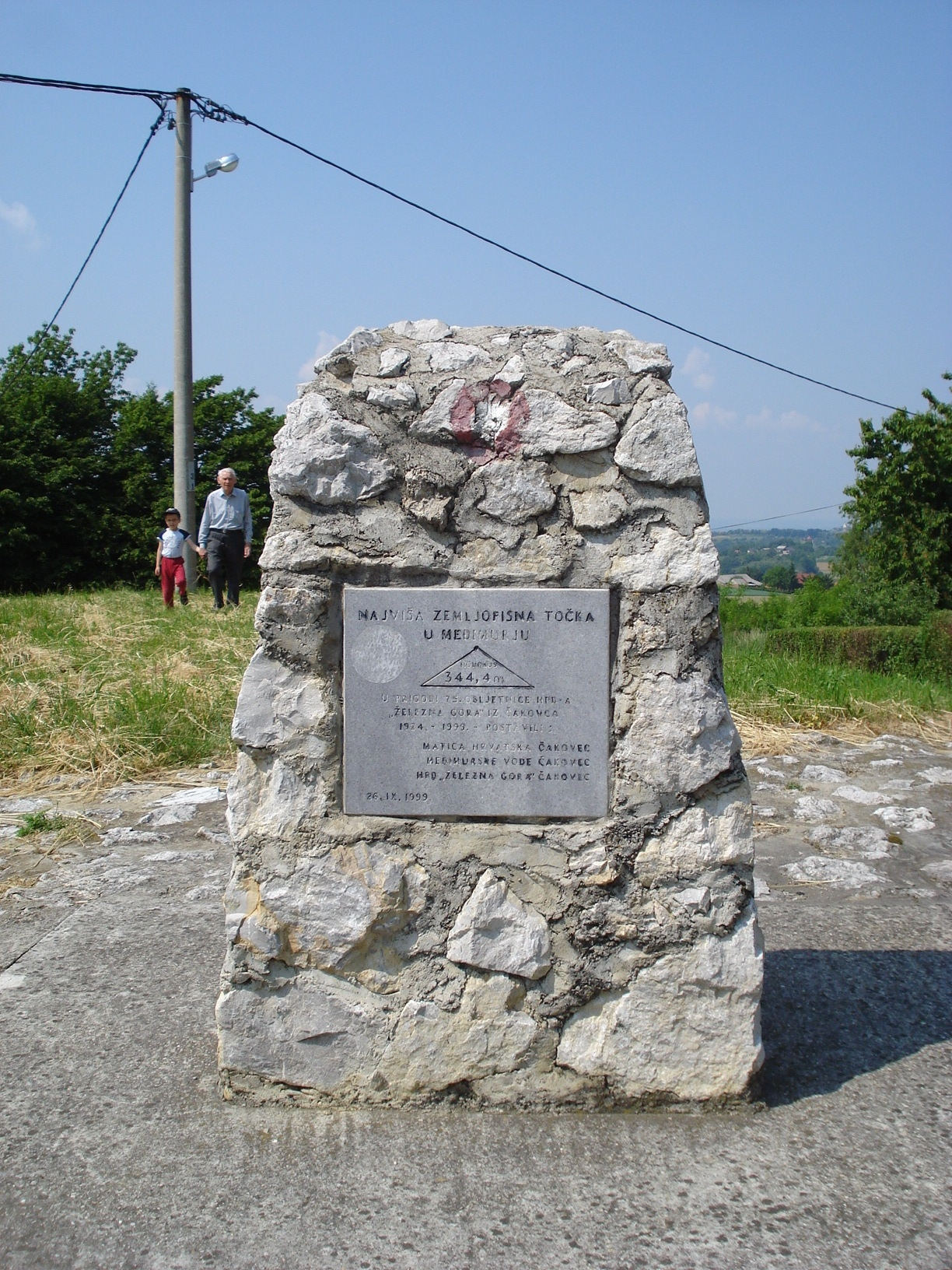
- Mohokos stone landmark

Highest point
- Elevation: 344 m (1,129 ft)
- Prominence: slight
- Coordinates: 46°27′00″N 16°22′59″E

Geography
- Location within Croatia
- Location: Sveti Juraj na Bregu, Croatia
- Parent range: Easternmost slopes of the Alps

The Mohokos is the highest peak of a hill range situated in Međimurje County, northern Croatia. The hill range extends for about 20 kilometres across the northwestern part of the County (so called Upper Međimurje) in northwest-southeast direction and represents the terminal easternmost slopes of the Alps.

As the highest elevation in the County, Mohokos lies exactly 344,4 metres above the sea level. There are meadows, vineyards, orchards and groves around it. On the top there is a stone landmark with a built-in polished plaque containing the following text: "The highest geographical point in Međimurje – Mohokos 344,4 m – 26.IX.1999".

Mohokos is a popular tourist destination, especially for many admirers of hiking, hillwalking or bicycle touring.
