= Banfi =

Banfi is a surname. It may also refer to:

== People ==
- Antonio Banfi (1886–1957), Italian philosopher and senator
- Emilio Banfi (1881–unknown), Italian track and field athlete
- Karina Banfi (born 1972), Argentine politician
- Lino Banfi (born 1936), Italian film actor and presenter
- Raúl Banfi (1914 –unknown), Uruguayan football player
- Rosanna Banfi (born 1963), Italian actress

== Company ==
- Banfi Vintners, wine company

== Places ==
- Banfi, Croatia, village in northern Croatia

== See also ==
- Banfi Manor, old building in northern Croatia
