= Miklavec =

- Village
- Location within Croatia
- Coordinates: 46°29′06″N 16°30′22″E
- Country: Croatia
- County: Međimurje County
- Municipality: Podturen

Area
  - Total: 3.1 km^{2} (1.2 sq mi)

Population (2021)
  - Total: 391
  - Density: 130/km^{2} (330/sq mi)
- Time zone: UTC+1 (CET)
  - Summer (DST): UTC+2 (CEST)
- Postal code: 40316 Vratišinec

Miklavec (Hungarian: Mikófa) is a village in Međimurje County, Croatia.
