= Podturen =

- Municipality
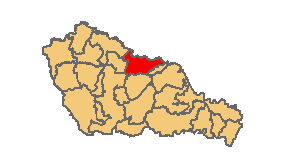
- Location within Međimurje County

- Location within Croatia
- Coordinates: 46°28′N 16°32′E
- Country: Croatia
- Region: Northern Croatia (Međimurje)
- County: Međimurje County

Government
  - Municipal mayor: Perica Hajdarović (HDZ)

Area
  - Municipality: 31.9 km^{2} (12.3 sq mi)
  - Urban: 10.2 km^{2} (3.9 sq mi)

Population (2021)
  - Municipality: 3,517
  - Density: 110/km^{2} (286/sq mi)
  - Urban: 1,323
  - Urban density: 130/km^{2} (336/sq mi)
- Time zone: UTC+1 (CET)
  - Summer (DST): UTC+2 (CEST)
- Postal code: 40317 Podturen
- Area code: 040
- Website: opcina-podturen.hr

Podturen (Hungarian: Bottornya) is a village and a municipality in Međimurje County, Croatia.

== History ==
The parish of St. Martin in Podturen was first mentioned in 1334 in the first list of parishes in Međimurje. Podturen was mentioned in 1367 as the village Tornu. During the 15th century, it was mentioned as the fortress Turnišće. In September 1601, 24,000 soldiers gathered in the Turnišće fortress with the task of retaking the Kaniža fortress, which had been captured by the Ottomans a year earlier. In 1644, Count Petar Zrinski purchased the fortress and village of Podturen. During the reign of Juraj IV Zrinski (1566-1603), Protestantism developed in Međimurje and the catholic church in Podturen was converted into a Calvinist church.

In 1708, Podturen was destroyed by Rakoczy's troops during Rákóczi's War of Independence. In 1786, it had 116 houses, inhabited by 125 families, or 725 inhabitants, of which 387 were women. There were also 8 nobles, 7 craftsmen and merchants, and 50 serfs. Podturen received its Hungarian name Bottornya in 1900.

In August 2008, the mayors of Kerkaszentkiraly and Podturen signed an agreement on building a bridge over the Mura river as well as a 3 km road connecting the two towns.

== Geography ==
The municipality of Podturen is located in the northern part of Međimurje County and covers an area of 31.23 km². The municipality borders Slovenia to the north and Hungary to the northeast. It also borders Dekanovec to the east, Belica to the south, Čakovec to the southwest, Vratišinec to the west and Mursko Središće to the northwest.

The area of the Podturen municipality is divided into two parts - the southern part, with arable agricultural land and the Dubrava forest between Sivica and Podturen, and part of the Mura River Protected Landscape which extends from the northwestern to the southeastern part of Podturen.

== Demographics ==
In the 2021 census, the municipality had a population of 3,517 in the following settlements:

- Celine, population 316
- Ferketinec, population 157
- Miklavec, population 391
- Novakovec, population 694
- Podturen, population 1,323
- Sivica, population 636
Podturen: Population trends 1857–2021
v

population	2786	3150	3410	3795	3919	4575	4987	5364	5910	6327	5740	5681	5124	4663	4392	3873	3517
	1857	1869	1880	1890	1900	1910	1921	1931	1948	1953	1961	1971	1981	1991	2001	2011	2021

Sources: Croatian Bureau of Statistics publications

== Administration ==
The current mayor of Podturen is Perica Hajdarović (HDZ) and the Podturen Municipal Council consists of 13 seats.

Groups	Councilors per group
HDZ-HSLS	7 / 13
NPS-SDP	5 / 13
Social Democrats	1 / 13
