= Zebanec Selo =

- Village
- Location within Croatia
- Coordinates: 46°28′30″N 16°24′18″E
- Country: Croatia
- County: Međimurje County
- Municipality: Selnica

Area
  - Total: 2.3 km^{2} (0.89 sq mi)

Population (2021)
  - Total: 312
  - Density: 140/km^{2} (350/sq mi)
- Time zone: UTC+1 (CET)
  - Summer (DST): UTC+2 (CEST)
- Postal code: 40314 Selnica

Zebanec Selo (Hungarian: Hidegfalu) is a village in Croatia.
