= Križovec =

- Village
- Location within Croatia
- Coordinates: 46°29′23″N 16°29′40″E
- Country: Croatia
- County: Međimurje County
- Municipality: Mursko Središće

Area
  - Total: 3.9 km^{2} (1.5 sq mi)

Population (2021)
  - Total: 537
  - Density: 140/km^{2} (360/sq mi)
- Time zone: UTC+1 (CET)
  - Summer (DST): UTC+2 (CEST)
- Postal code: 40315 Mursko Središće

Križovec (Hungarian: Muraszentkereszt) is a small village in Međimurje County, Croatia, part of the town of Mursko Središće.
