= Lopatinec =

- Village
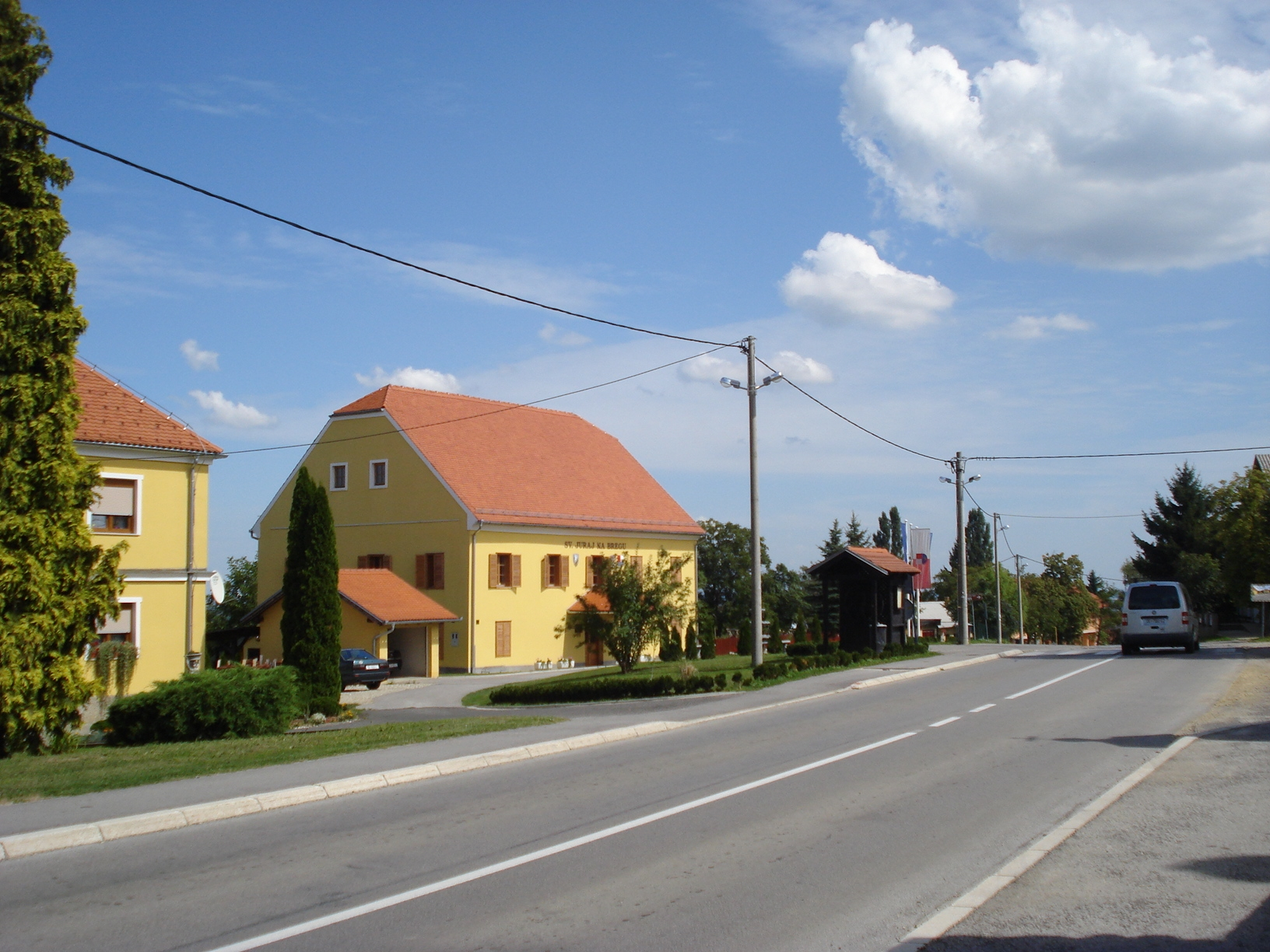
- Ivan Goran Kovačić street

- Location within Croatia
- Coordinates: 46°25′59″N 16°22′59″E
- Country: Croatia
- County: Međimurje County
- Municipality: Sveti Juraj na Bregu

Area
  - Total: 4.0 km^{2} (1.5 sq mi)

Population (2021)
  - Total: 906
  - Density: 230/km^{2} (590/sq mi)
- Time zone: UTC+1 (CET)
  - Summer (DST): UTC+2 (CEST)
- Postal code: 40311 Lopatinec

Lopatinec (Hungarian: Lapáthegy) is a village in the municipality of Sveti Juraj na Bregu in Međimurje County, Croatia.

== Demographics ==
In 2021, Lopatinec had 906 residents.

Lopatinec: Population trends 1857–2021
v

population	241	329	1604	1868	412	462	396	507	668	673	765	815	894	868	947	915	906
	1857	1869	1880	1890	1900	1910	1921	1931	1948	1953	1961	1971	1981	1991	2001	2011	2021

Sources: Croatian Bureau of Statistics publications
