= Selnica, Međimurje County =

Selnica
- Municipality
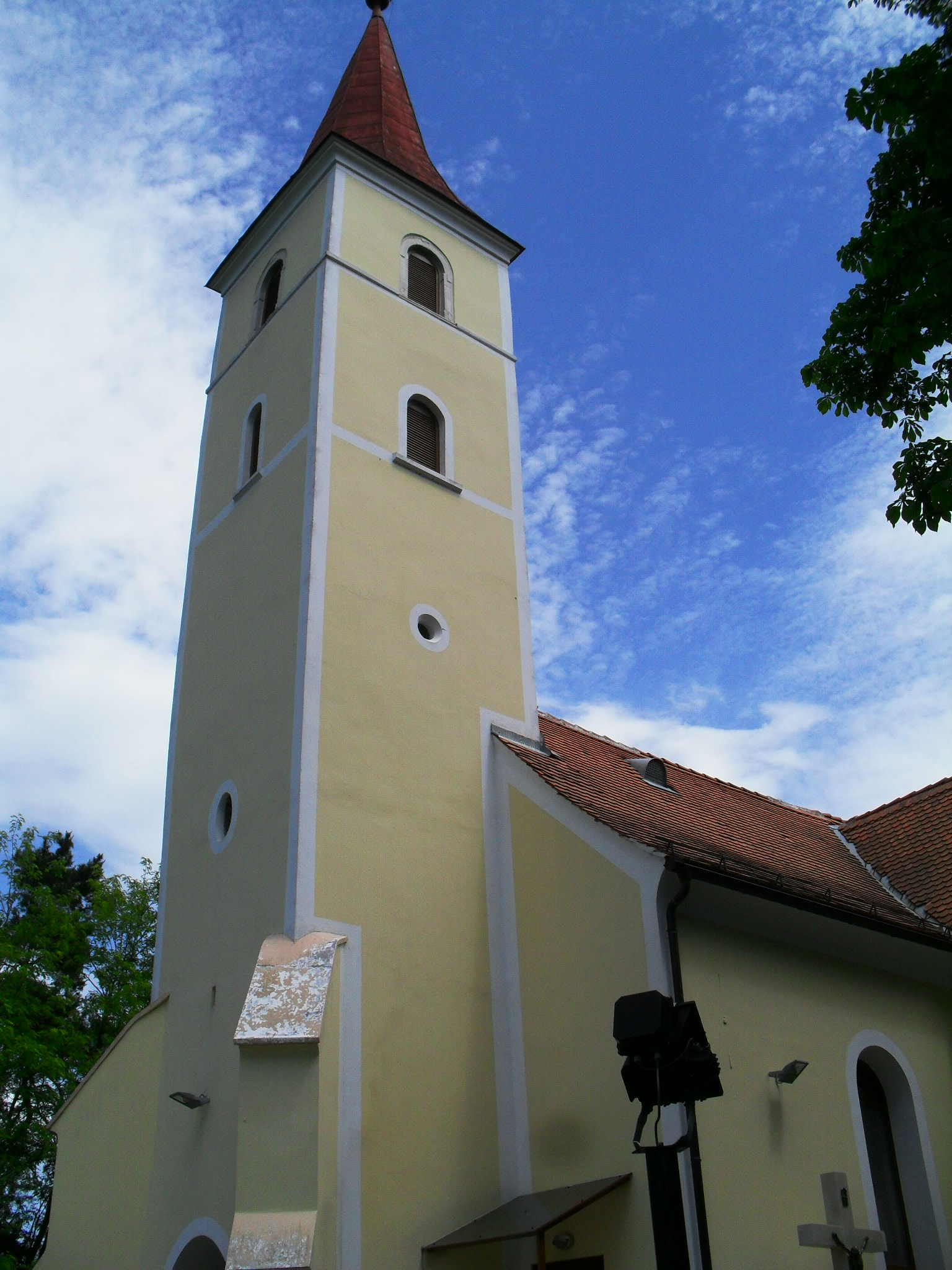
- Church of Saint Mark

- Location within Croatia
- Coordinates: 46°29′N 16°23′E
- Country: Croatia
- Region: Northern Croatia (Međimurje)
- County: Međimurje County

Government
  - Municipal mayor: Ervin Vičević (HDZ)

Area
  - Municipality: 24.9 km^{2} (9.6 sq mi)
  - Urban: 5.5 km^{2} (2.1 sq mi)

Population (2021)
  - Municipality: 2,636
  - Density: 106/km^{2} (274/sq mi)
  - Urban: 949
  - Urban density: 170/km^{2} (450/sq mi)
- Time zone: UTC+1 (CET)
  - Summer (DST): UTC+2 (CEST)
- Postal code: 40313 Sveti Martin na Muri
- Website: selnica.hr

Selnica (Hungarian: Szelence) is a village and municipality in Međimurje County, in northern Croatia.

== History ==
In 1334 Selnica was mentioned as a Catholic parish named Sancti Marci in the Census of parishes of the Zagreb Diocese. A charter issued in 1478 mentions the villages Zenth Mark and Zelnycz. The name of the settlement Selnica was first mentioned in the parish list from 1501, during the reign of the Ernuszt family.

In 1802, Count Juraj Festetić ruled the estates in Selnica, and all the peasants in the village were his serfs. After the annexation of Međimurje by Croatia in 1849, all the serfs were freed.

In the 1850s, oil was discovered in Selnica. Exploitation of the two oil fields began in the late 19th century and lasted until the 1950s.

During World War II, Međimurje, including Selnica, was occupied by Hungary. In late November 1944, the Yugoslav Partisans attacked Hungarian troops which were guarding the oil wells in Selnica. After an hour of fighting, the Hungarians surrendered. 12 Hungarians were killed, 15 wounded, and 56 captured.

The Municipality of Selnica was established in 1992.

== Geography ==
Selnica is located in part of Međimurje called Gornje Međimurje. Village of Selnica, municipality centre, is about 14 kilometres northwest from Čakovec, and some 100 kilometres north of Zagreb. The municipality covers an area of 24.84 km^{2}.

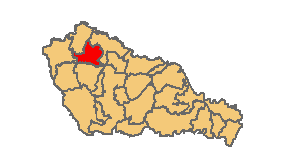
Location within Međimurje County

Geomorphologically, the municipality can be divided into two parts. The southern part consists of low hills called Međimurske Gorice, while the northern part consists of alluvial plain of the river Mur.

== Demographics ==
In the 2021 census, the municipality had a population of 2,636 in 10 villages.

Village	Population
Bukovec	168
Donji Koncovčak	244
Donji Zebanec	173
Gornji Zebanec	184
Merhatovec	122
Plešivica	83
Praporčan	189
Selnica	949
Zaveščak	212
Zebanec Selo	312
TOTAL	2,636

The majority of inhabitants are Croats making up 98.03% of population.

Selnica: Population trends 1857–2021
v

population	1529	1534	1808	2048	2412	2634	2572	3136	3652	3784	3527	3664	3413	3322	3442	2991	2636
	1857	1869	1880	1890	1900	1910	1921	1931	1948	1953	1961	1971	1981	1991	2001	2011	2021

Sources: Croatian Bureau of Statistics publications

== Administration ==
The current mayor of Selnica is Ervin Vičević (HDZ) and the Selnica Municipal Council consists of 13 seats.

Groups	Councilors per group
HDZ	7 / 13
NPS-SDP	4 / 13
Independents	2 / 13

== Culture ==
The privately owned Oldtimer museum Šardi with a collection of historic cars, motorcycles, tractors, and other vehicles is located in Selnica.

There are also several associations operating in Selnica:

- VFD Selnica
- Cultural and Artistic Society Selnica
- Orienteering Club MEĐIMURJE
- TENNIS CLUB «SELNICA»
- Sports and Recreation Association «Sport for All», Selnica
- Sports and Recreation Association «Sport for All», Plešivica
- Association «Oaza 98»
- Pensioners' Association, Selnica branch
- Hunting Association “Srndać”
- Oldtimer Club
- FC Zebanec
- FC Donji Koncovčak
- FC «Mladost» Selnica
- Firefighter Sports Association MERHATOVEC
- Association Pikač
- Shooting Club Selnica
- Consumers' Association Međimurje, Trg sv. Marka 2, Selnica
- Consumer Protection Development Organization – Alliance, Trg sv. Marka 2, Selnica
- Garage Freaks, Bukovec

== Gallery ==
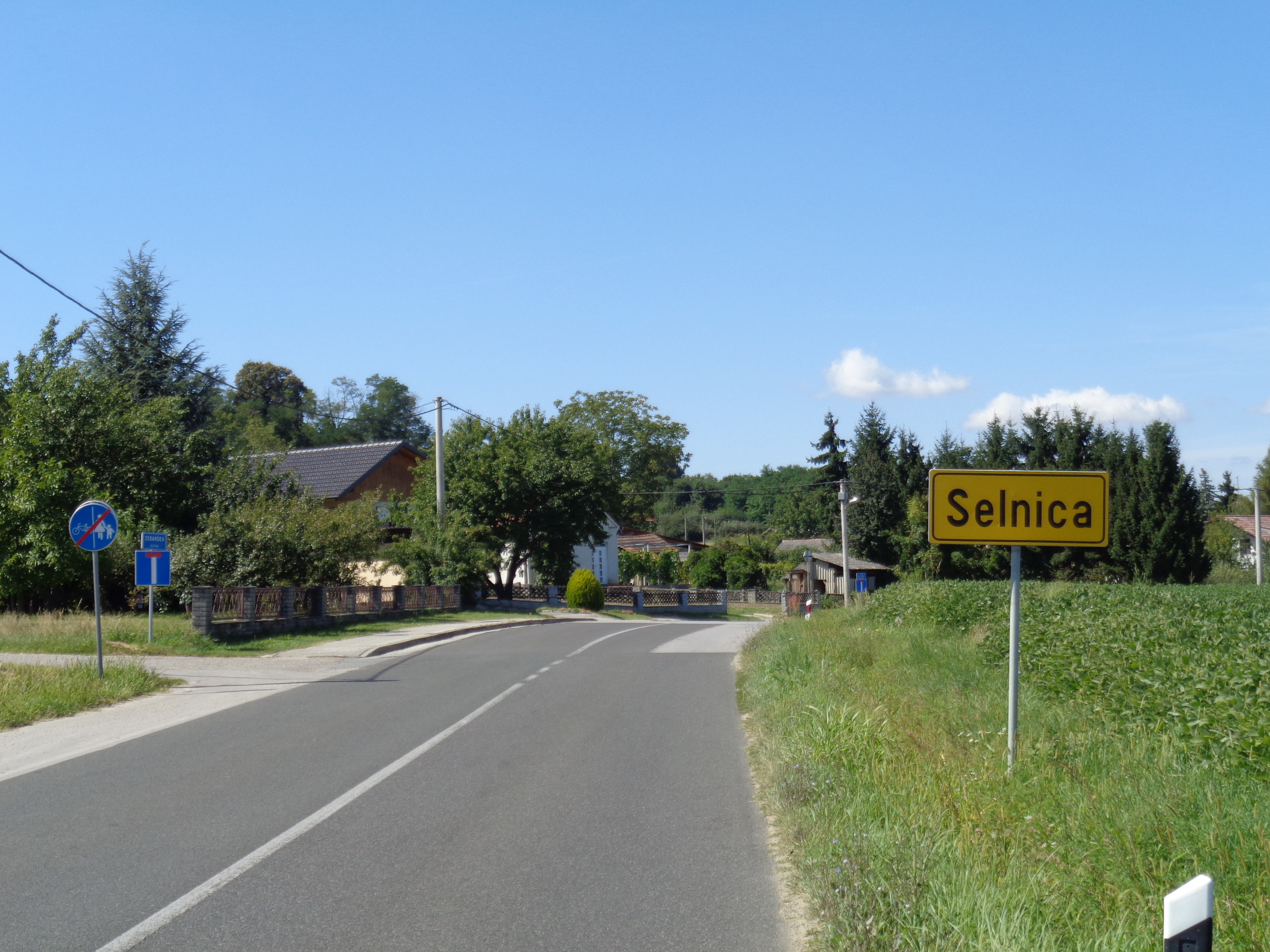
Entrance to the village

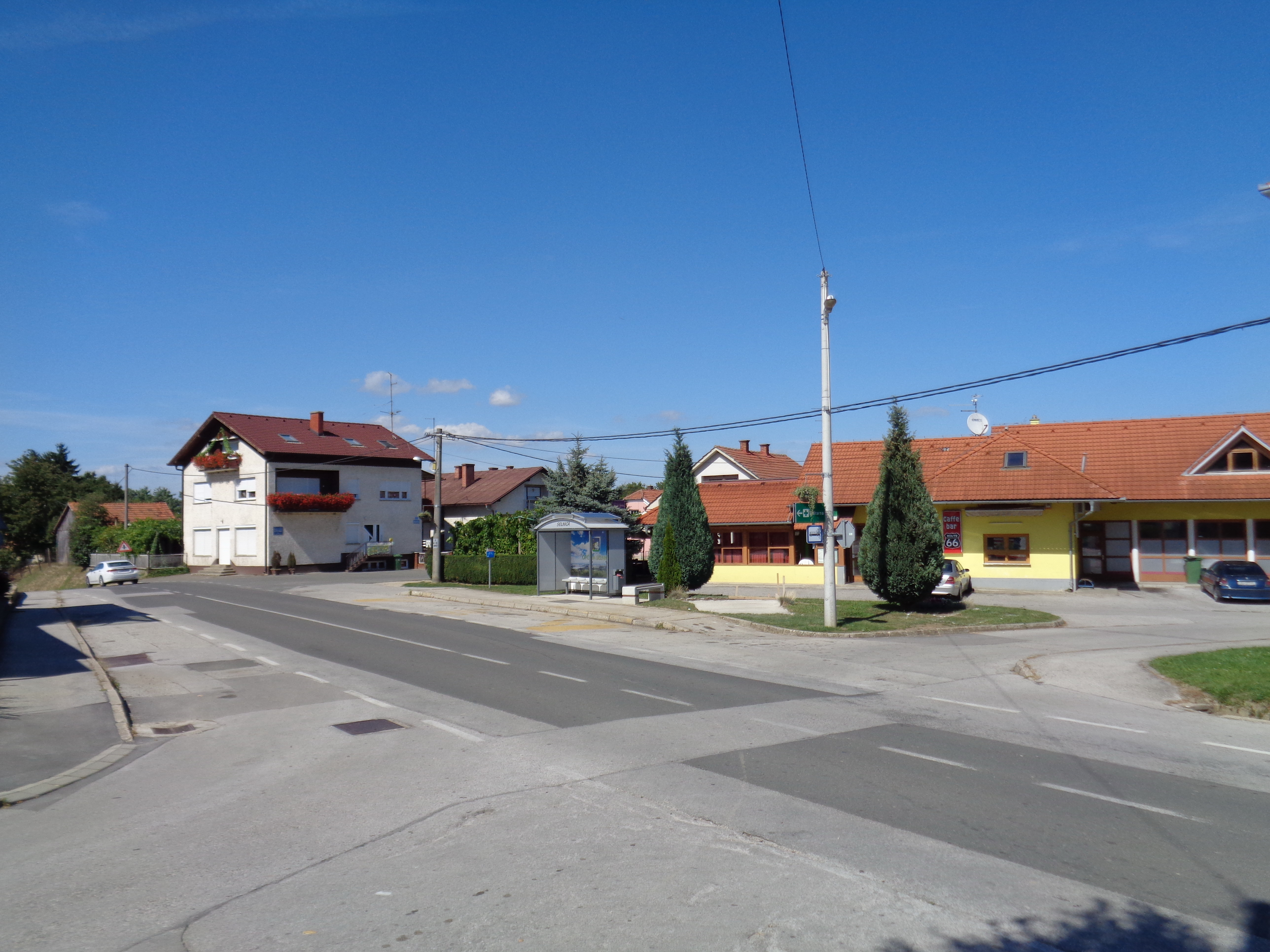
Village centre

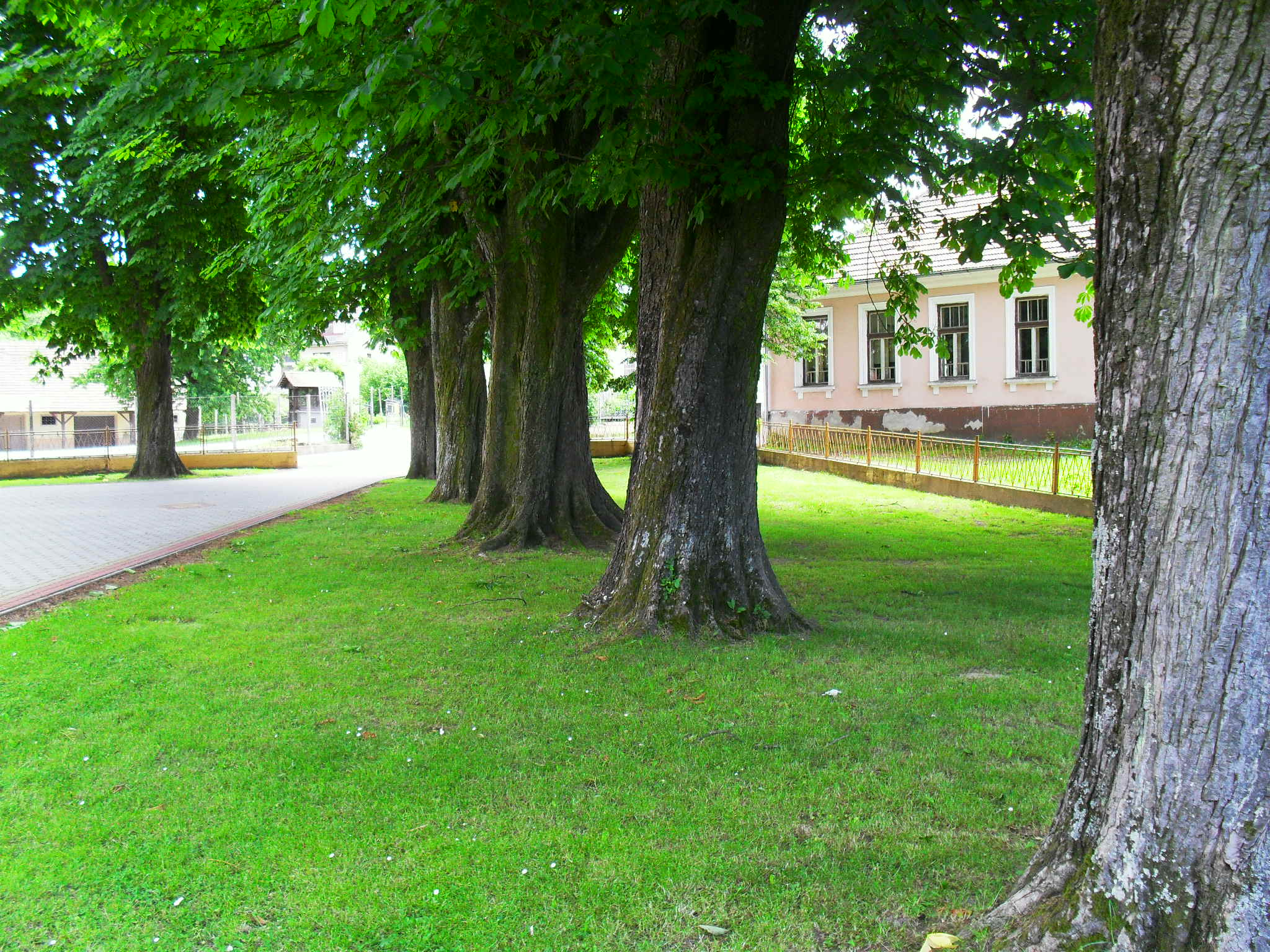
Old chestnut trees

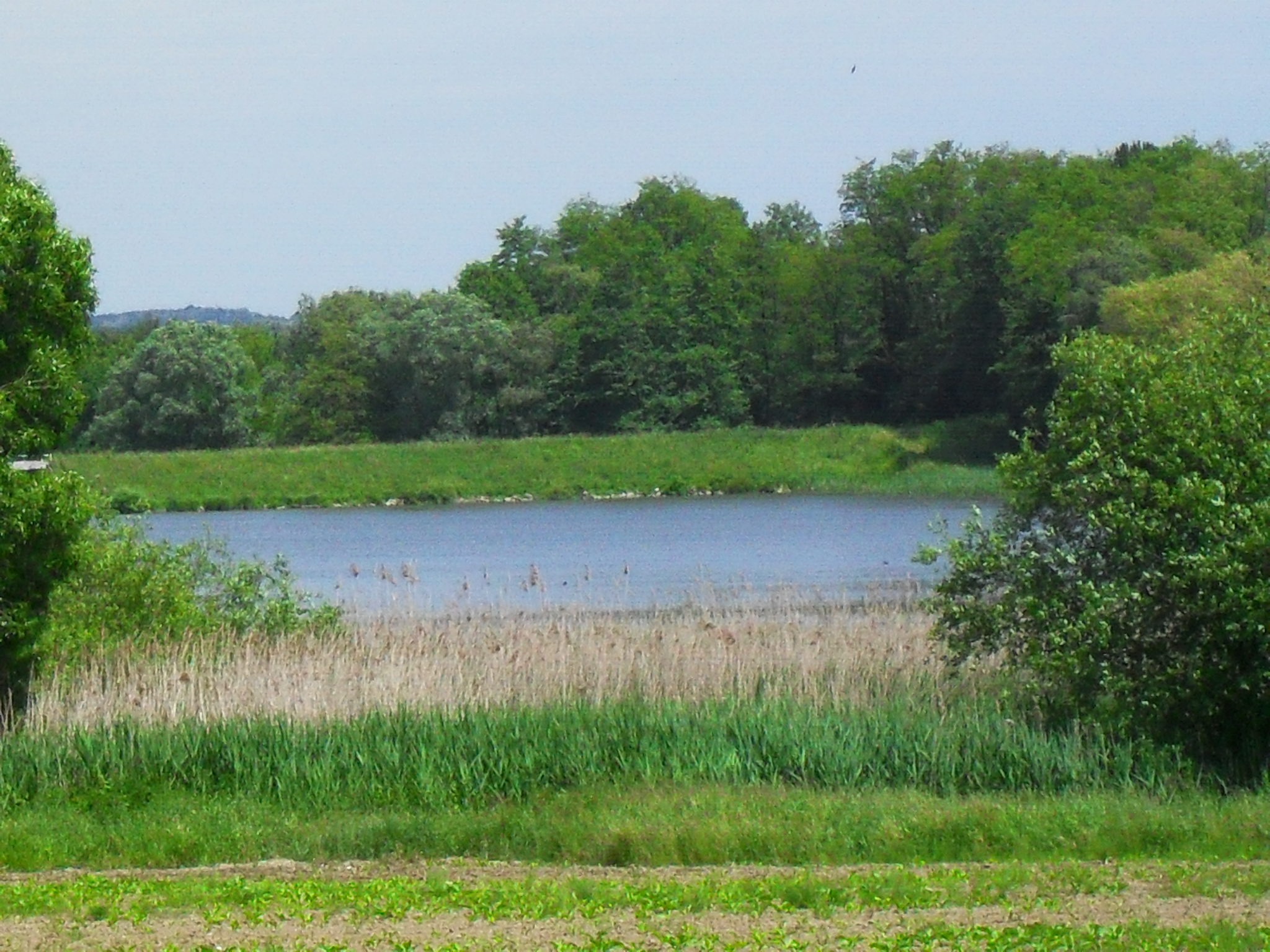
Artificial pond near Selnica

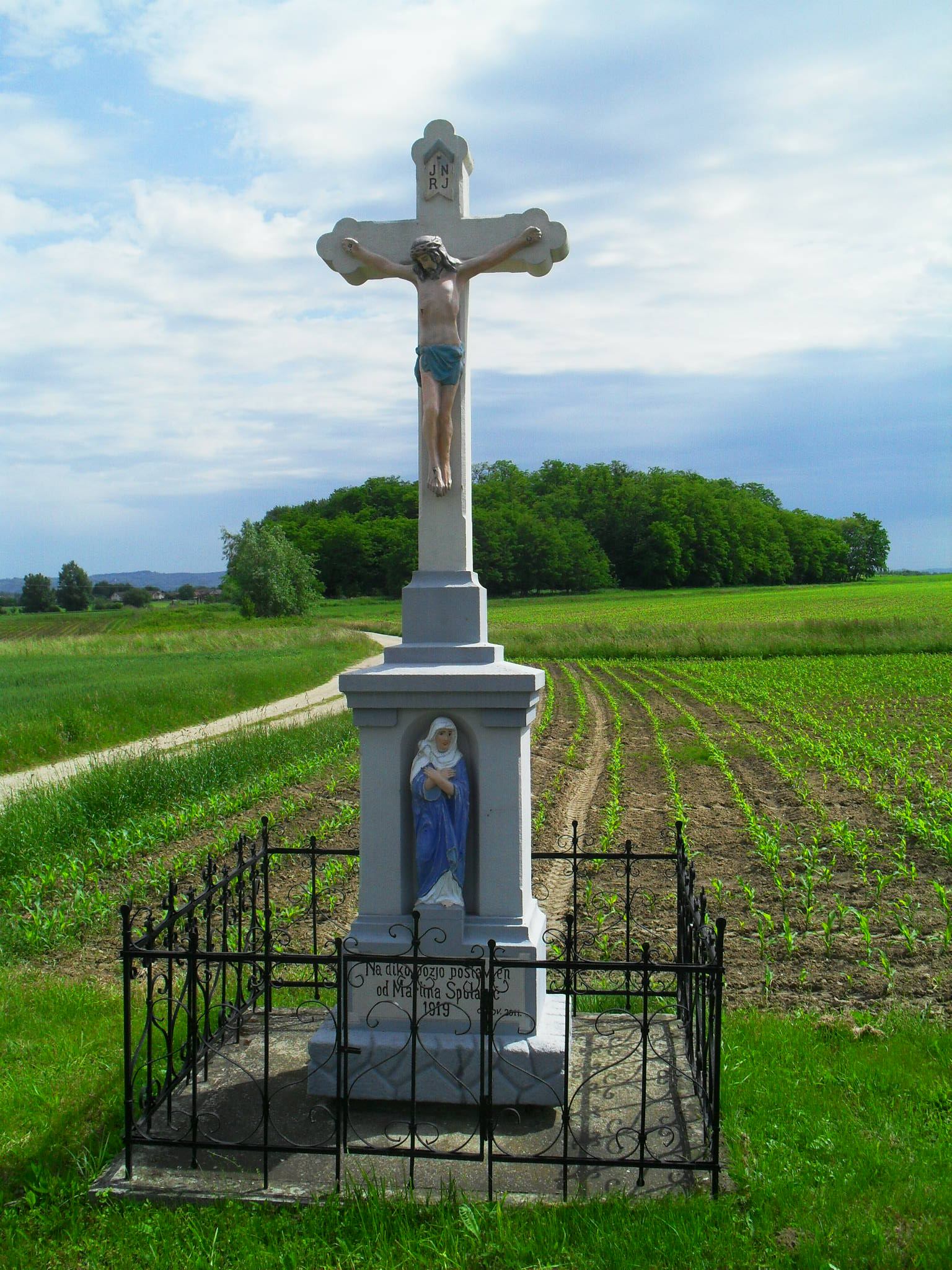
Cross of Martin Špolarić

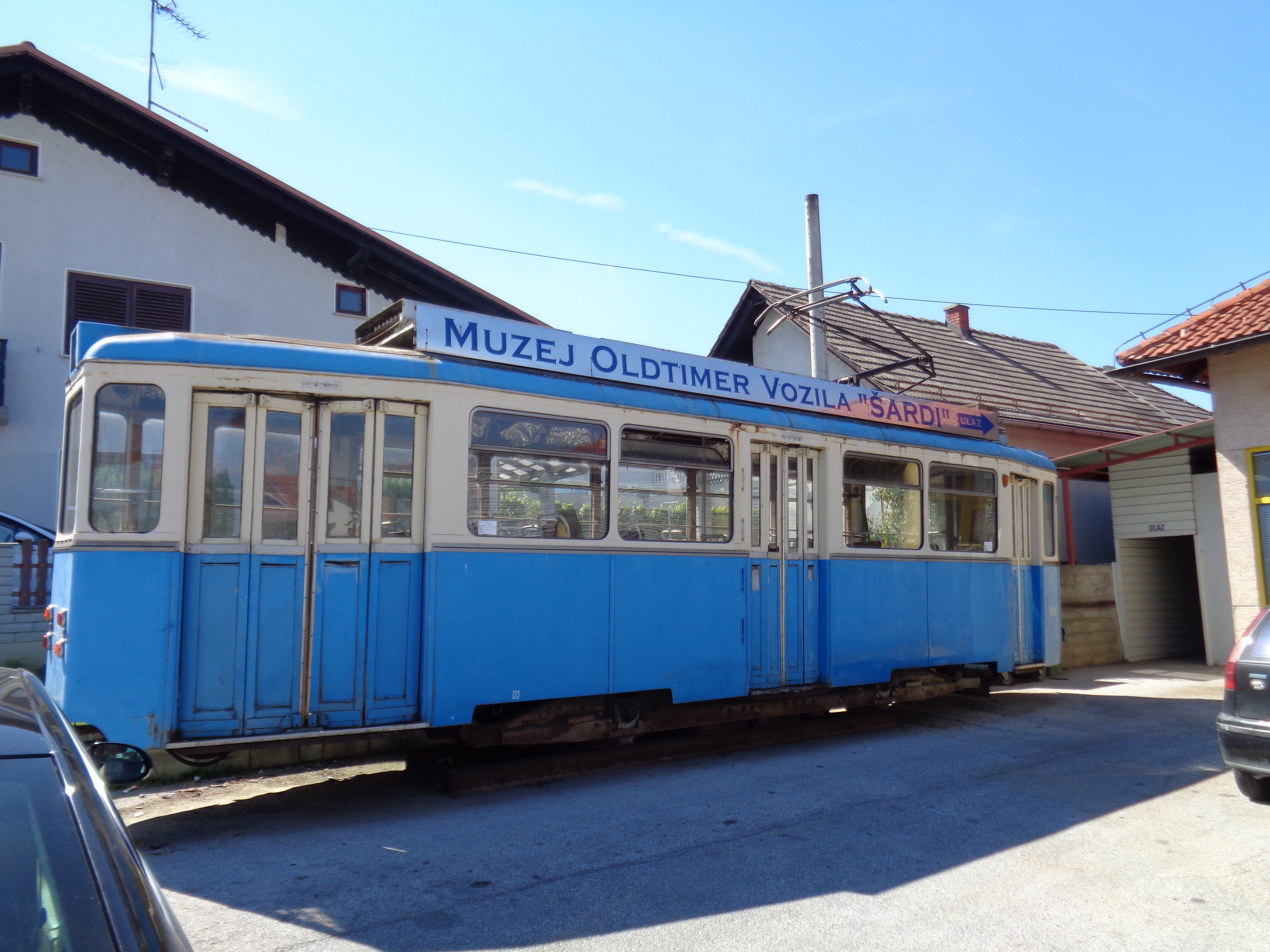
Oldtimer Museum ´´Šardi´´
