= Mursko Središće =

- Town
- Grad Mursko Središće; Town of Mursko Središće
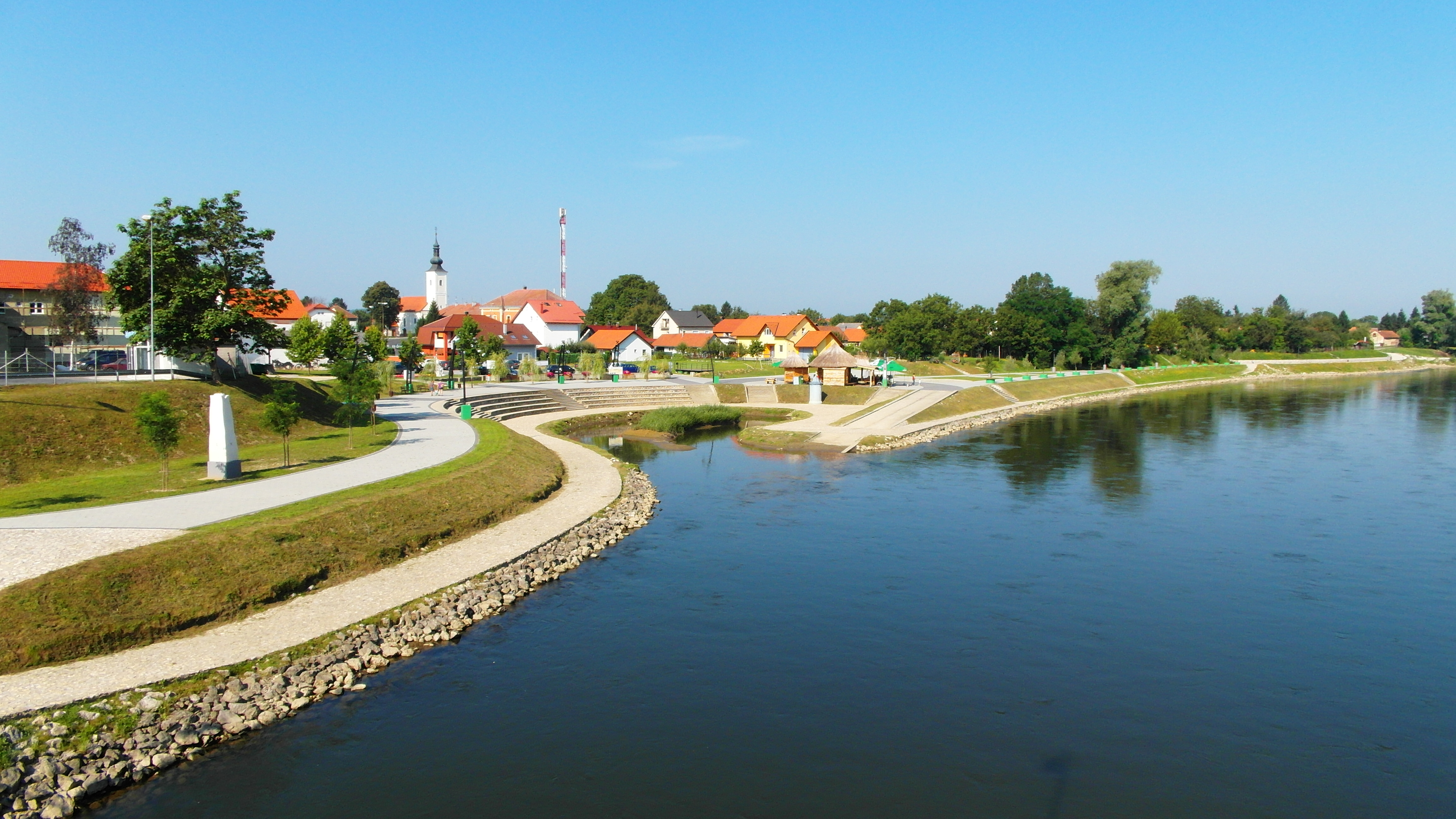
- Promenade of Mursko Središće

- Coat of arms
- Interactive map of Mursko Središće
- Location within Croatia
- Coordinates: 46°30′N 16°26′E
- Country: Croatia
- Region: Northern Croatia (Međimurje)
- County: Međimurje County

Government
  - Mayor: Dražen Srpak (HDZ)

Area
  - Town: 33.9 km^{2} (13.1 sq mi)
  - Urban: 12.5 km^{2} (4.8 sq mi)

Population (2021)
  - Town: 5,855
  - Density: 173/km^{2} (447/sq mi)
  - Urban: 3,321
  - Urban density: 266/km^{2} (688/sq mi)
- Time zone: UTC+1 (CET)
  - Summer (DST): UTC+2 (CEST)
- Postal code: 40315 Mursko Središće
- Website: mursko-sredisce.hr

Mursko Središće (Hungarian: Muraszerdahely, Kajkavian: Mursko Središče) is the northernmost town in Croatia and in Međimurje County which lies on the river Mura, the natural line dividing Croatia from Slovenia.

== History ==
Mursko Središće was first mentioned in 1334 as Sancti Martini in Zredysche. Historian Ivan Kukuljević-Sakcinski claimed that the site was occupied by the Romans and was known under the name of Helicanum. If true, it would have been a strategic point on the road between Ptuj (Poetovio) in Slovenia and Carnuntum (Petronell) on the river Danube, the post between today's Vienna and Bratislava in Slovakia. The existing road was built in the 1st century. Other historians disagree, claiming that Helicanum might be today's Sveti Martin na Muri or nearby Lendava (Lendva).

In 1477, Mursko Središće was officially mentioned as an important trade post with three other places in Međimurje (Čakovec, Prelog and Nedelišće). In 1650, the town was known as Muraszerdahely and in 1660 the local chapel of St. Martin was documented. In 1716 the church of St. Ladislaus, was built in the gothic style, but was ruined by a flood in 1690. It was then rebuilt in the late baroque style.

In 1856, the world's first oil field was created in the settlement of Peklenica. At the time, two men and one woman were collecting the oil into containers and 25 to 35 liters of crude oil could be collected per day. In 1918, 1,000 tons of oil were produced in Peklenica.

In late 1918, Mursko Središće was occupied and annexed by the Kingdom of Serbs, Croats and Slovenes together with the rest of Međimurje. During World War II, between 1941 and 1945, it was occupied by Hungary.

After World War I, coal was discovered in 1921, and its exploitation began soon after. The first coal mine was opened in 1926, with workers brought from Slovenia. The company that engaged in coal exploitation, Kraljić & Majhen Co., was nationalized in 1946 and was managed under the name of Međimurski ugljenokopi until it was closed in 1972. In that period (1946–1972), coal extraction was significant, with a total output of 4,593,961 t (an average of 155,000 t each year).

== Demographics ==
In the 2021 census, the town had a population of 5,855 in the following settlements:

- Hlapičina, population 600
- Križovec, population 537
- Mursko Središće, population 3,321
- Peklenica, population 1,072
- Štrukovec, population 325
Town of Mursko Središće: Population trends 1857–2021
v

population	2211	2416	2710	3069	3435	3682	4062	4630	5207	5671	5878	6483	6421	6631	6548	6307	5855
	1857	1869	1880	1890	1900	1910	1921	1931	1948	1953	1961	1971	1981	1991	2001	2011	2021

Sources: Croatian Bureau of Statistics publications

== Administration ==
The current mayor of Mursko Središće is Dražen Srpak (HDZ) and the Mursko Središće Town Council consists of 13 seats.

Groups	Councilors per group
HDZ-HDS-HSLS	8 / 13
Social Democrats	3 / 13
SDP	2 / 13

== Culture ==
There are numerous organized clubs, such as tennis, basketball, association football, chess, hunting and fishing clubs.

== Gallery ==
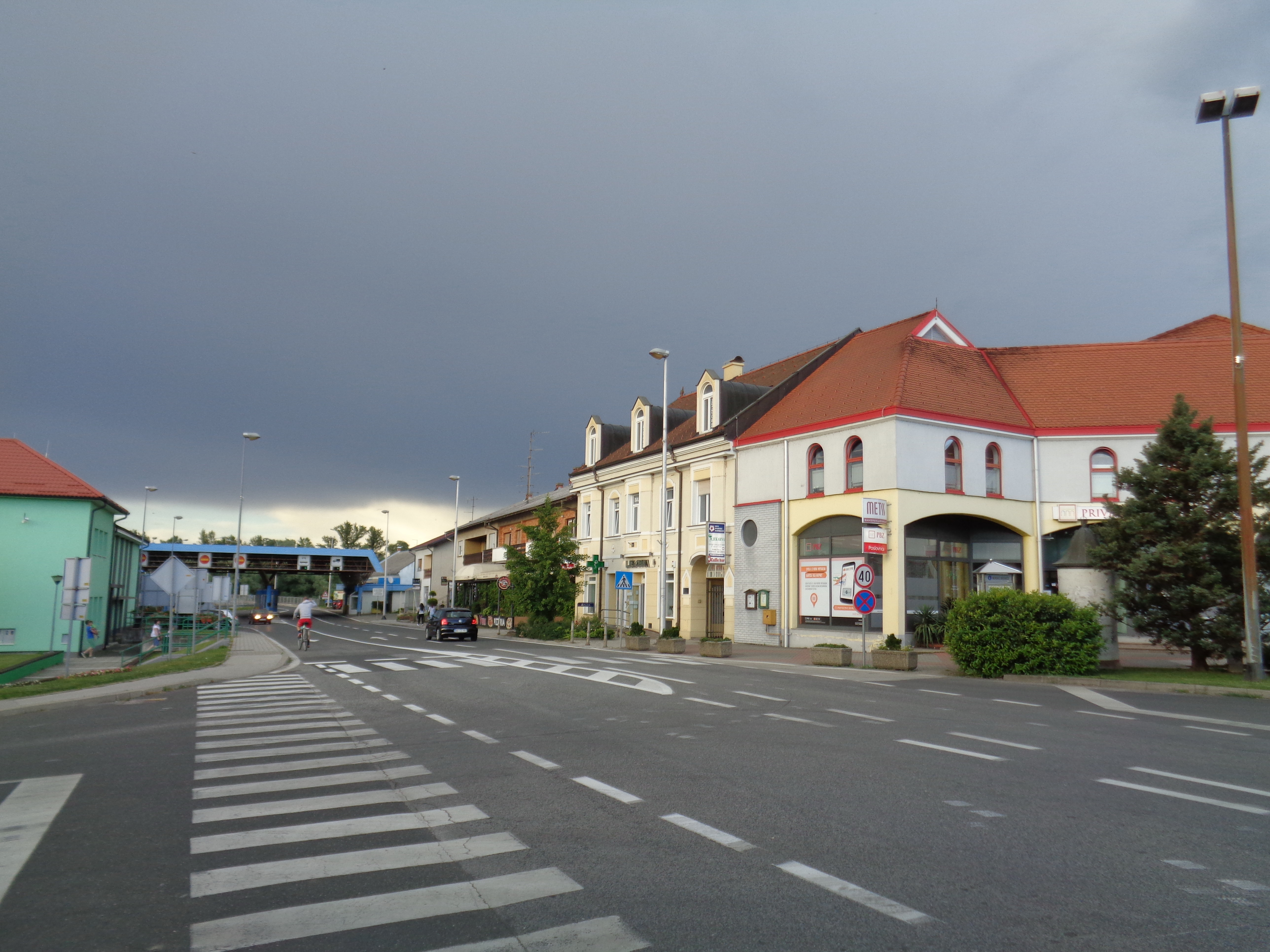
Town centre

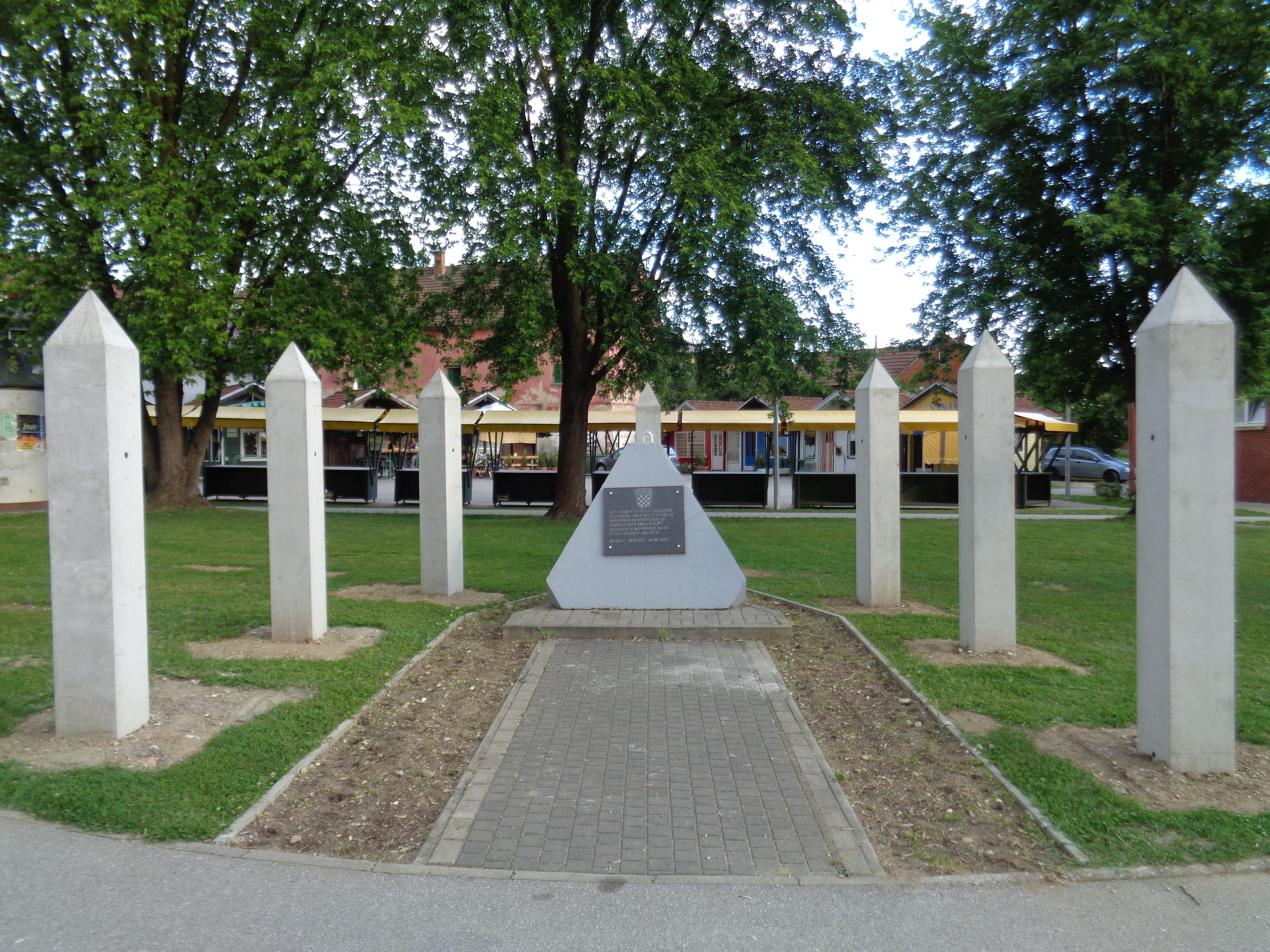
Memorial to Croatian defenders in the Croatian War of Independence

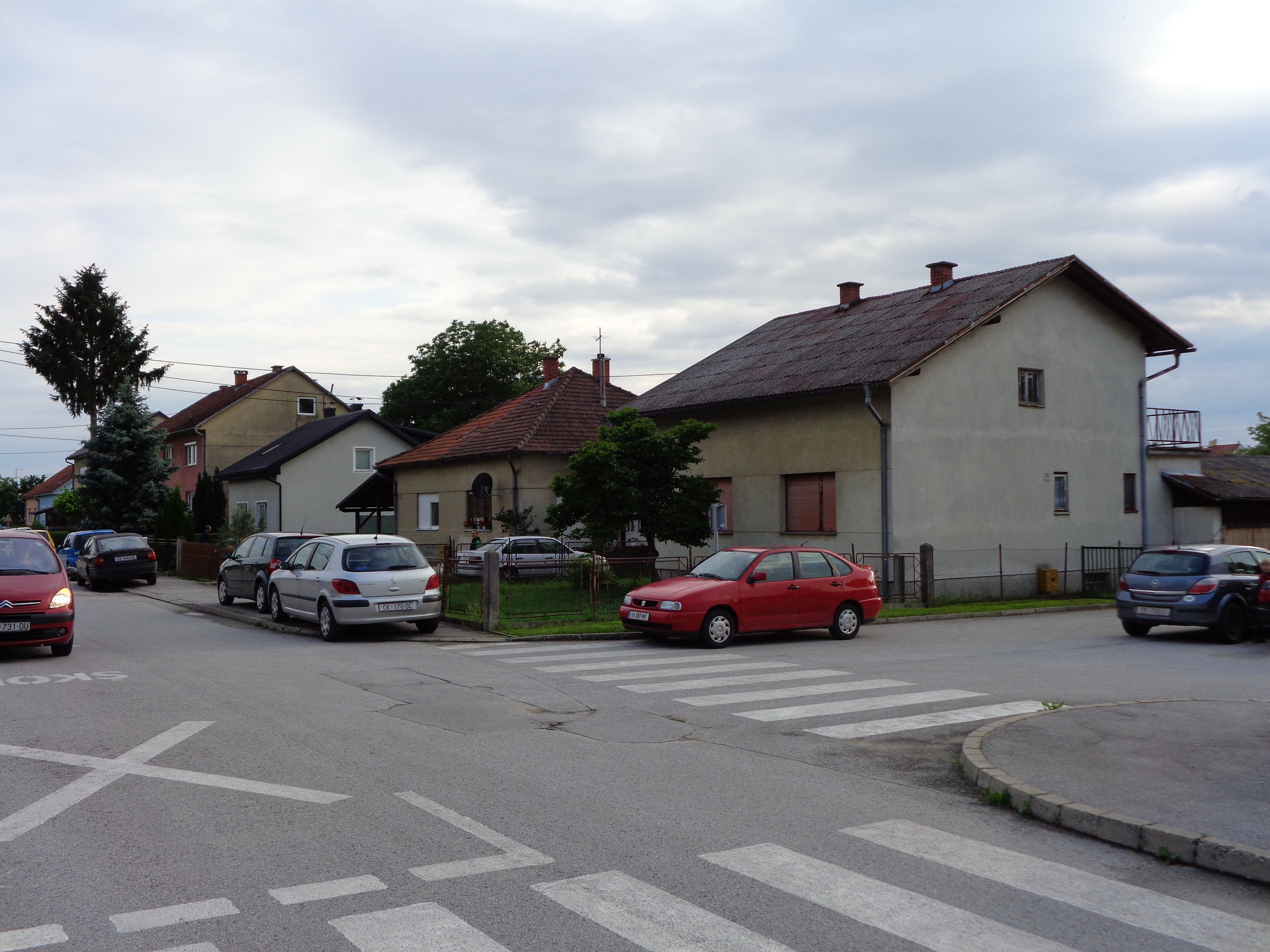
Vladimir Nazor Street in a Mursko Središće suburb

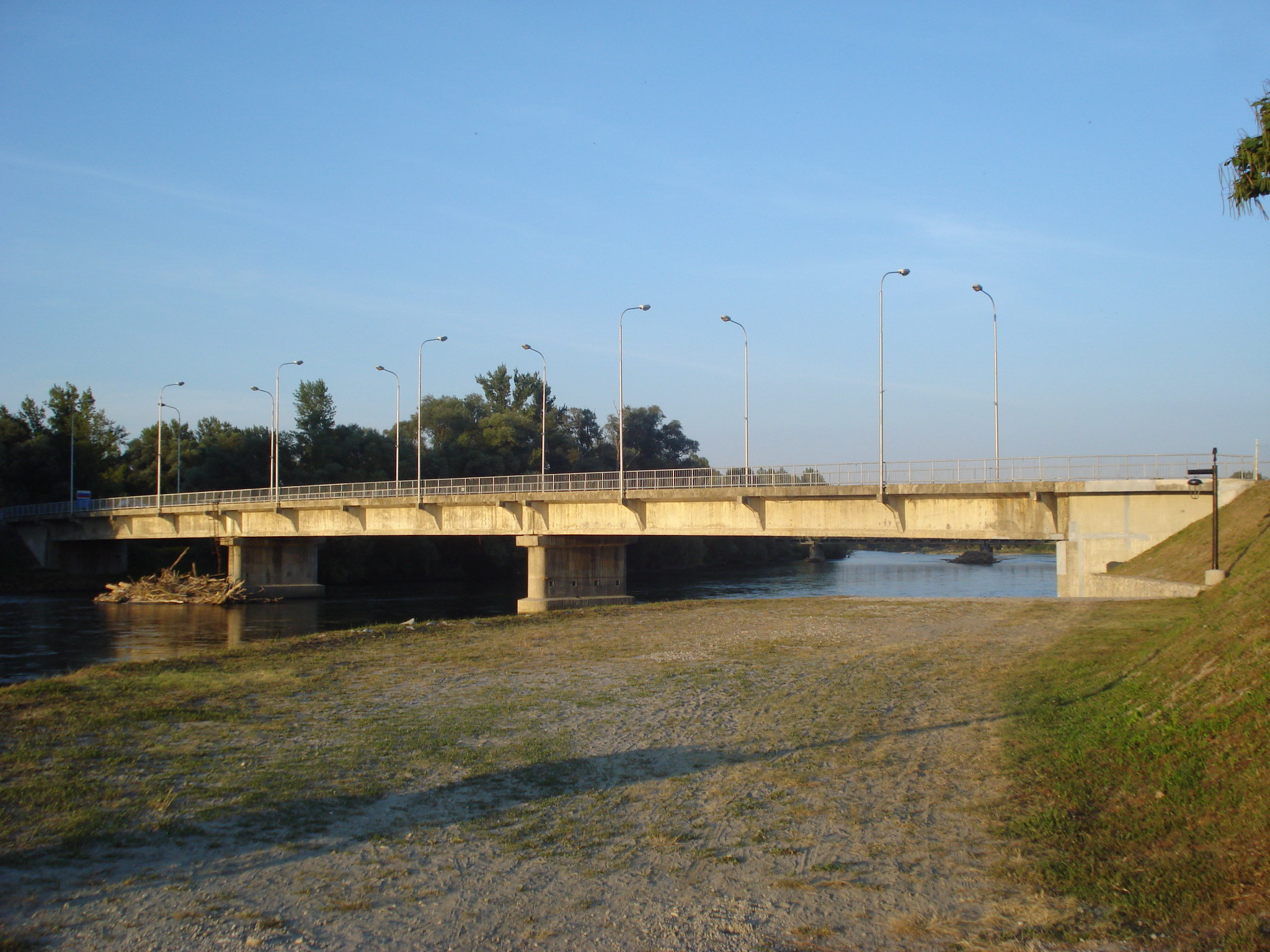
Road bridge over the Mura River

== Notable people ==
- Srećko Bogdan, Croatian professional footballer
