= List of Hungarian exonyms for places in Croatia =

This is a list of Hungarian language exonyms for cities, towns and villages located in Croatia.

== Bjelovar-Bilogora County ==
- Bijela Béla
- Boriš Boriszállás
- Bjelovar Belovár
- Čazma Csázma
- Daruvar Daruvár
- Dežanovac Szentlélek
- Dioš Diósszentpál
- Dobra Kuća Dobrakutya
- Đulovac Gyulovac
- Garešnica Gerzence
- Grbavac Gerbavác
- Grubišno Polje Grobosinc
- Hercegovac Szentkirály
- Kapela Kápolna
- Mala Barna Kisbarna
- Mala Pisanica Kispisznice
- Međurača Megyericse
- Nova Rača Racsa
- Rovišće Rojcsa
- Sirač Szircs
- Štefanje Szentistván
- Velika Barna Nagybarna
- Veliki Grđevac Nagygordonya
- Zrinski Topolovac Tapalóc

== Brod-Posavina County ==
- Bebrina Bebrene
- Brodski Stupnik Sztupnik
- Bukovlje Bukolya
- Cernik Csernek
- Davor Dávor
- Donji Andrijevci Alsóandrievce
- Dragalić Dragalics
- Garčin Garcsin
- Gornja Vrba Felsőverbafalva
- Gornji Bogićevci Felsőbogics
- Gundinci Gundince
- Nova Gradiška Újgradiska
- Nova Kapela Újkapela
- Okučani Okucsány
- Oprisavci Opriszavce
- Oriovac Orjovác
- Podcrkavlje Podcerkve
- Podvrško Podversa
- Rešetari Resetár
- Sibinj Szibény
- Sikirevci Szikérevce
- Slavonski Brod Bród or Nagyrév
- Stara Gradiška Ógradiska
- Staro Petrovo Selo Ópetroszelló
- Velika Kopanica Nagykopanica
- Vrbje Verbie

== Dubrovnik-Neretva County ==
- Dubrovnik Raguza
- Korčula Korcsula
- Metković Metkovics
- Mljet Mlyet
- Lastovo Lasztovo
- Ploče Plocse

== Lika-Senj County ==
- Brinje Brinye
- Donji Lapac Alsólapac
- Gornji Lapac Felsőlapac
- Gospić Goszpics
- Jablanac Tengervárad
- Karlobag Karlopagó
- Otočac Otocsán
- Perušić Perusics
- Plitvička Jezera Plitvice
- Senj Zengg
- Udbina Korbávia

== Osijek-Baranja County ==
- Aljmaš Almás
- Baranjsko Petrovo Selo Petárda
- Batina Kiskőszeg
- Beli Manastir Pélmonostor
- Belišće Belistye
- Bijelo Brdo Darnó
- Bilje Bellye
- Bolman Bolmány
- Branjina Baranyakisfalud
- Branjin Vrh Baranyavár
- Čeminac Laskafalu
- Čepin Csapa or Csepén
- Ceremošnjak Ceremosvölgye
- Čepinski Martinci Bucsinfalva
- Čokadinci Csokad
- Cret Bizovački Verőfény
- Đakovo Diakóvár
- Dalj Dál
- Darda Dárda
- Donja Motičina Alsómoticsina
- Donji Miholjac Szentmihály
- Dopsin Dobsza
- Draž Darázs
- Duboševica Dályok
- Đurđanci Szentgyörgy
- Erdut Erdőd
- Ernestinovo Ernőháza
- Feričanci Ferencfalva
- Gajić Hercegmárok
- Gorjani Gara
- Grabovac Albertfalu
- Gradac Našički Váralja
- Harkanovci Harkányfalva
- Hrastin Haraszti
- Ivanovac Derzs
- Jagodnjak Kácsfalu
- Jasenovac Öbölpuszta
- Kamenac Kő
- Karanac Karancs
- Kešinci Kese
- Klisa Tard
- Kneževi Vinogradi Hercegszőlős
- Kneževo Főherceglak
- Kopačevo Kopács
- Koprivna Kaporna
- Koritna Karatna
- Koška Kosvár
- Kotlina Sepse
- Kozarac Keskend
- Kozjak Keskenyerdő
- Kuševac Vatinc
- Ladimirevci Ladomérfalva
- Laslovo Szentlászló
- Levanjska Varoš Névna
- Lovas Daljski Lovász
- Luč Lőcs
- Lug Laskó
- Majške Međe Majspuszta
- Marjančaci Marjánc
- Martin Nekcseszentmárton
- Mece Mecepuszta
- Mirkovac Frigyesföld
- Mitrovac Mitvárpuszta
- Nemetin Németi
- Nard Nart
- Našice Nekcse
- Novi Bezdan Újbezdán
- Novi Bolman Újbolmány
- Novi Čeminac Újlaskafalu
- Novo Nevesinje Botond
- Osijek Eszék
- Petlovac Baranyaszentistván
- Petrijevci Petróc
- Podolje Nagybodolya
- Podravlje Jenőfalva
- Podravska Moslavina Monoszló
- Podunavlje Dunaipuszta
- Popovac Baranyabán
- Punitovci Panyit
- Retfala Rétfalu
- Samatovci Szombattelek
- Sarvaš Szarvas
- Semeljci Hosszúfalu
- Selci Đakovački Szelce
- Silaš Szilas
- Sokolovac Katalinpuszta
- Sudaraž Szudarázs
- Sveti Đurađ Szentgyörgy
- Suza Csúza
- Šag Ság
- Širine Braidaföld
- Šodolovci Páznán
- Šumarina Benge
- Švajcarnica Őrhely
- Tenja Tenye
- Tikveš Tököspuszta
- Topolje Izsép
- Torjanci Torjánc
- Tvrđavica Kisdárda
- Uglješ Ölyves
- Valpovo Valpó
- Vardarac Várdaróc
- Viljevo Villyó
- Vladislavci Lacháza
- Vuka Kisújlak
- Zelčin Zselcsinic
- Zeleno Polje Szentistvánpuszta
- Zlatna Greda Bokroshátpuszta
- Zmajevac Vörösmart

== Primorje-Gorski Kotar County ==
- Crikvenica Cirkvenica
- Čabar Csabar
- Opatija Abbázia
- Rijeka Fiume
- Vrbovsko Vrbovszkó

== Istria County ==
- Pula Póla

== Koprivnica-Križevci County ==
- Drnje Dörnye
- Đelekovec Gyekelóc
- Đurđevac Szentgyörgyvár
- Ferdinandovac Décseszentpál
- Gola Góla
- Gotalovo Gotála
- Kalinovac Kalinóc
- Kalnik Nagykemlék
- Kloštar Podravski Gorbonok
- Koprivnica Kapronca
- Križevci Kőrös
- Legrad Légrád
- Molve Molna
- Novigrad Podravski Kamarcsa or Szentklára
- Peteranec Szentpéter
- Podravske Sesvete Mindszent
- Rasinja Apajkeresztúr
- Repaš Répás
- Virje Prodavíz
- Ždala Zsdála

== Karlovac County ==
- Karlovac Károlyváros
- Modruš Modrus
- Ozalj Ozaly
- Slunj Szluin
- Vojnić Vojnics

== Krapina-Zagorje County ==
- Klanjec Klanyec
- Krapina Korpona
- Marija Bistrica Máriabeszterce

== Međimurje County ==
- Badličan Zalabárdos
- Banfi Bánfihegy
- Benkovec Zalabenkő
- Bogdanovec Károlyszeg
- Brezje Nyíresfalva
- Bukovec Bükkösd
- Brezovec Muranyirád
- Čakovec Csáktornya
- Čehovec Csehlaka
- Čestijanec Hétház
- Cirkovljan Drávaegyház
- Črečan Cseresznyés
- Čukovec Drávasiklós
- Dekanovec Dékánfalva
- Domašinec Damása
- Donja Dubrava Alsódomború
- Donji Hrašćan Harastyán
- Donji Koncovčak Alsóvéghegy
- Donji Kraljevec Murakirály
- Donji Mihaljevec Alsómihályfalva
- Donji Pustakovec Alsópusztafa
- Donji Vidovec Muravid
- Donji Zebanec Alsóhideghegy
- Dragoslavec Kedveshegy
- Dragoslavec Breg Újhegy
- Dragoslavec Selo Delejes
- Draškovec Ligetvár
- Držimurec Dezsérlaka
- Dunjkovec Dúshely
- Ferketinec Alsóferencfalva
- Frkanovec Ferenchegy
- Gardinovec Muragárdony
- Goričan Muracsány
- Gornja Dubrava Felsődomború
- Gornji Hrašćan Drávacsány
- Gornji Koncovčak Felsővéghegy
- Gornji Kraljevec Felsőkirályfalva
- Gornji Kuršanec Felsőzrínyifalva
- Gornji Mihajlevec Felsőmihályfalva
- Gornji Pustakovec Felsőpusztafa
- Gornji Vidovec Felsővidafalva
- Grabrovnik Gáborvölgy
- Gradiščak Várhegy
- Grkaveščak Göröghegy
- Hemuševec Henisfalva
- Hlapičina Lapány
- Hodošan Hodosány
- Ivanovec Drávaszentiván
- Jalšovec Erzsébetlak
- Jurčevec Györgylaka
- Jurovčak Györgyhegy
- Jurovec Györgyike
- Kapelščak Margithegy
- Knezovec Gyümölcsfalva
- Kotoriba Kotor
- Krištanovec Kristóffalva
- Križovec Muraszentkereszt
- Kuršanec Zrínyifalva
- Lapšina Tündérlak
- Macinec Miksavár
- Mačkovec Nyírvölgy
- Mala Subotica Kisszabadka
- Mali Mihaljevec Kismihályfalva
- Marof Majorlak
- Martinuševec Mártonhalom
- Merhatovec Morzsahegy
- Mihovljan Drávaszentmihály
- Miklavec Mikófa
- Mursko Središće Muraszerdahely
- Leskovec Kismagyaród
- Lopatinec Lapáthegy
- Nedelišće Drávavásárhely
- Novakovec Muraújfalu
- Novo Selo na Dravi Drávaújfalu
- Novo Selo Rok Jánosfalva or Rókusújfalu
- Okrugli Vrh Kerekhegy
- Oporovec Drávafüred
- Orehovica Drávadiós
- Otok Ottok
- Palinovec Alsópálfa
- Palovec Felsőpálfa
- Peklenica Bányavár
- Plešivica Kopaszhegy
- Pleškovec Bányahegy
- Podbrest Drávaszilas
- Podturen Bottornya
- Praporčan Paphegy
- Prelog Perlak
- Preseka Hétvezér
- Pretetinec Drávaóhíd
- Prhovec Királylak
- Pribislavec Zalaújvár
- Pušćine Pusztafa
- Robađe Robádihegy
- Savska Ves Százkő
- Selnica Szelencehegy
- Šenkovec Szentilona
- Sivica Muraszilvágy
- Slakovec Édeskút
- Stanetinec Határőrs
- Štefanec Drávaszentistván
- Strahoninec Drávanagyfalu
- Strelec Muralövő
- Štrigova Stridóvár
- Štrukovec Muraréthát
- Sveta Maria Muraszentmária
- Sveti Juraj u Trnju Tüskeszentgyörgy
- Sveti Križ Muraszentkereszt
- Sveti Martin na Muri Muraszentmárton
- Sveti Urban Szentorbánhegy
- Totovec Tótfalu
- Trnovec Drávamagyaród
- Turčišće Törökudvar
- Tupkovec Turzóvölgy
- Vučetinec Oskolahegy
- Vugrišinec Vargahegy
- Vukanovec Farkashegy
- Vularija Drávaollár
- Vratišinec Murasiklós
- Vrhovljan Ormos
- Zasadberg Gyümölcshegy
- Zaveščak Faluhegy
- Zebanec Selo Hidegfalu
- Žabnik Békásd
- Železna Gora Vashegy
- Žiškovec Zsidény

== Požega-Slavonia County ==
- Brekinska Brekinszka
- Brestovac Bresztovác
- Brodski Drenovac Kisdarnóc
- Čaglin Cseglény
- Dobrogošće Dobrogostya
- Duboka Doboka
- Gradište Gradistye
- Imrijevci Imrepaka
- Jakšić Jakusfölde
- Jurkovac Györkvölgy
- Kaptol Pozsegaszentpéter
- Kula Gotószentgyörgy
- Kutjevo Gotó
- Mali Bilač Kisbilács
- Migalovci Migalóc
- Nova Ljeskovica Újleszkovica
- Oljasi Velikeolaszi
- Orljavac Orjava
- Pakrac Pakrác
- Požeška Koprivnica Kapronca
- Pleternica Pleterniceszentmiklós
- Požega Pozsega
- Ratkovica Gradpatak
- Ruševo Hrusszóvölgy
- Sapna Szapnó
- Sesvete Pozsegamindszent
- Stara Ljeskovica Óleszkovica
- Svilna Szvinna
- Tekić Tekics
- Trenkovo Trenkfalva
- Velika Velike
- Veliki Bilač Nagybilács

== Sisak-Moslavina County ==
- Batinova Kosa Batinovakosza
- Crni Potok Cernipotok
- Donja Čemernica Alsócsemernice
- Gređani Gregyán
- Hrvatska Kostajnica Horvátkosztajnica
- Hrvatsko Selo Horvátfalu
- Katinovac Katinovác
- Kutina Kutenya
- Mala Vranovina Kisvránovina
- Malička Malicska
- Novska Novszka
- Pecka Pecke
- Petrinja Petrinya
- Ponikvari Ponikvár
- Sisak Sziszek
- Staro Selo Topusko Topuszkaófalu
- Topusko Topuszka
- Velika Vranovina Nagyvránovina
- Vorkapić Vorkapics

== Split-Dalmatia County ==
- Brač Brács
- Makarska Makarszka
- Omiš Omis
- Solin Szolin
- Split Szplit
- Tučepi Tucsepi

== Varaždin County ==
- Bednja Bednya
- Biškupec Varasdpüspöki
- Breznica Prisznica
- Donja Voća Alsóvocsa
- Ivanec Ivánc
- Jalžabet Szenterzsébet
- Ludbreg Ludberg
- Madžarevo Magyarlak
- Maruševec Máriasócszentgyörgy
- Novi Marof Újmarof
- Petrijanec Szentpéter
- Sračinec Szracsinc
- Varaždin Varasd
- Varaždinske Toplice Varasdfürdő
- Veliki Bukovec Bukócszentpéter
- Vidovec Zamlacsszentvid
- Visoko Viszoka

== Virovitica-Podravina County ==
- Bačevac Berzőceszentgyörgy
- Brezovica Berzőce
- Budakovac Budakóc
- Čačinci Csacsince
- Čađavica Szagyolca
- Čemernica Csemernica
- Donja Bukovica Alsóbakóca
- Donja Pištana Alsópistana
- Donje Bazije Bozjás
- Gaćište Gvestye
- Gornja Pištana Felsőpistana
- Gornje Bazje Boz
- Gornji Miholjac Felsőmiholjác
- Jasenaš Jaszen
- Jugovo Polje Szenterzsébet
- Hum Varoš Humváros
- Lozan Szentbenedek
- Lukač Lukács
- Mikleuš Szentmiklós
- Nova Bukovica Újbakóca
- Novaki Novák
- Novi Gradac Újgrác
- Orahovica Raholca
- Orešac Oresanc
- Pitomača Pitomacsa
- Rezovac Rezovác
- Rogovac Szentbertalan
- Sopje Szópia
- Slatina Szalatnok
- Slatinski Drenovac Darnóc
- Starin Sztára
- Suha Mlaka Szuhamlaka
- Suhopolje Szentendre
- Sveti Đurđ Szentgyörgy
- Špišić Bukovica Bakva
- Turnašica Doroszlóbakva
- Vaška Vaska
- Virovitica Verőce
- Višnjica Visnyica
- Vladimirovac Aladár
- Voćin Atyina or Vocsin
- Zdenci Izdenc
- Zrinj Lukački Zrinjpuszta

== Vukovar-Syrmia County ==
- Andrijaševci Andrásfalva
- Babina Greda Babagerenda
- Banovci Radasfalva
- Bapska Babafalva
- Berak Berki
- Bogdanovci Bogdánfalva
- Borovo Boró
- Bošnjaci Bosnyáki
- Cerić Cserity
- Čakovci Csák
- Donje Novo Selo Petyke
- Drenovci Drenóc
- Đeletovci Gyelétfalva
- Gradište Gradiste
- Gunja Gúnya
- Grabovo Garáb
- Ilača Illyefő
- Ilok Újlak
- Ivankovo Ivánkaszentgyörgy
- Jarmina Jaromnaszentmiklós
- Korog Kórógy
- Lovas Hosszúlovász
- Nuštar Berzétemonostor
- Opatovac Apáti
- Ostrovo Gegetinc
- Komletinci Komjáti
- Markušica Markusháza
- Mikluševci Szentmiklós
- Mirkovci Szegfalu
- Mlaka Antinska Tótfalu
- Mohovo Moha
- Negoslavci Negoszlovce
- Nijemci Csótnémeti
- Novi Čakovci Újcsák
- Novi Mikanovci Horváti
- Nuštar Berzétemonostor
- Otok Atak
- Pačetin Pacsinta
- Petrovci Petróc
- Privlaka Perlaka
- Podgrađe Váralja
- Rokovci Harapk
- Sotin Szata
- Stari Jankovci Ivanóc
- Stari Mikanovci Horváti
- Šarengrad Atya
- Tompojevci Tompojevce
- Tordinci Valkótard
- Tovarnik Felsőtárnok
- Trpinja Terpenye
- Vinkovci Szentillye
- Vinkovački Banovci Bánóc
- Vrbanja Vérbánya
- Vođinci Vogyince
- Vukovar Vukovár, but in the Middle Ages Valkóvár
- Županja Zsupanya

== Zadar County ==
- Gračac Gracsác
- Zadar Zára

== Zagreb County ==
- Dugo Selo Dugoszelo
- Ivanić-Grad Ivanicsvár
- Jastrebarsko Jasztrebarszka
- Novi Farkašić Újfarkasfalva
- Pisarovina Piszárovina
- Pokupsko Kulpatő
- Samobor Szamobor
- Stari Farkašić Ófarkasfalva
- Sveta Nedelja Szentnedele
- Sveti Ivan Zelina Szentivánzelina
- Turopolje Túrmező
- Velika Gorica Nagygorica
- Vrbovec Verbovec
- Žumberak Zsumberk

== Zagreb capital ==
- Zagreb Zágráb
