= Gornja Čemernica =

Gornja Čemernica Горња Чемерница (Serbian)
- Village
- Location of Gornja Čemernica in Croatia
- Coordinates: 45°21′06″N 15°54′17″E
- Country: Croatia
- Region: Central and Eastern (Pannonian) Croatia
- County: Sisak-Moslavina County
- Municipality: Gvozd

Area
  - Total: 9.2 km^{2} (3.6 sq mi)
- Elevation: 180 m (590 ft)

Population (2021)
  - Total: 88
  - Density: 9.6/km^{2} (25/sq mi)
- Time zone: UTC+1 (CET)
  - Summer (DST): UTC+2 (CEST)
- Postal code: 44410
- Area code: (+385) 44

Gornja Čemernica (Serbian Cyrillic: Горња Чемерница) is a village in central Croatia, in the municipality of Gvozd, Sisak-Moslavina County. It is connected by the D6 highway.

== History ==
The village of Čemernica (comprising Gornja Čemernica and Donja Čemernica) suffered heavy demographic losses in the World war II losing 586 of its residents, 295 of whom perished in the Glina massacre on 3 August 1941. 68 more residents perished in the Jasenovac concentration camp.

== Demographics ==
According to the 2011 census, the village of Gornja Čemernica has 142 inhabitants. This represents 32.49% of its pre-war population according to the 1991 census.

The 1991 census recorded that 97.48% of the village population were ethnic Serbs (426/437), 0.69% were Yugoslavs (3/437), 0.46% were ethic Croats (2/437) and 1.37% were of other ethnic origin (6/437).

Historical population 1857-2011
v

population				550	667	652	650	728	488	481	490	455	451	437	232	142
	1857	1869	1880	1890	1900	1910	1921	1931	1948	1953	1961	1971	1981	1991	2001	2011

Sources: Croatian Bureau of Statistics publications

Note: Settlements of Donja Čemernica and Gornja Čemernica were reported separately from 1890 onwards. From 1857 to 1880, they were reported as single settlement of Čemernica. The data pertaining to former settlement of Čemernica is now contained within the data for the settlement of Donja Čemernica (which currently belongs to the municipality of Topusko).

== Sights ==
- Monument to the uprising of the people of Kordun and Banija
- Partisan Airfield Čemernica was one of 34 partisan airfields (850m long airstrip) used in World war II in Yugoslavia. The first plane, which landed on 22 July 1944, evacuated 18 badly wounded partisans along with 26 children to Bari, Italy. One of many notable passengers who landed at the Čemernica Airfield was Randolph Churchill, who established the British military mission at Topusko on 16 September 1944.

== Notable natives and residents ==
- Dmitar Obradović (1947–1992) - moderate politician and mayor of Vrginmost who was killed in 1992

== See also ==
- Glina massacres
