= Vorkapić, Croatia =

Vorkapić
- Village
- Location in Croatia
- Coordinates: 45°16′08″N 15°55′40″E
- Country: Croatia
- Region: Continental Croatia
- County: Sisak-Moslavina
- Municipality: Topusko

Area
  - Total: 8.4 km^{2} (3.2 sq mi)
- Elevation: 166 m (545 ft)

Population (2021)
  - Total: 10
  - Density: 1.2/km^{2} (3.1/sq mi)
- Time zone: UTC+1 (CET)
  - Summer (DST): UTC+2 (CEST)
- Postal code: 44415 Topusko
- Area code: (+385) 44

Vorkapić is a village in central Croatia, in the municipality of Topusko, Sisak-Moslavina County.

== Demographics ==
According to the 2011 census, the village of Vorkapić has 26 inhabitants. This represents 12.56% of its pre-war population according to the 1991 census.

According to the 1991 census, 99.03% of the village population were ethnic Serbs (205/207), 0.48% were ethnic Croats (1/207), and 0.48% were of other ethnic origin (1/207).

Population change 1857-2011
v

population	558	608	613	740	819	773	776	878	642	669	564	424	275	207	35	26
	1857	1869	1880	1890	1900	1910	1921	1931	1948	1953	1961	1971	1981	1991	2001	2011

Sources: Croatian Bureau of Statistics publications

== Sights ==
- Monument to the uprising of the people of Kordun and Banija

== See also ==
- Glina massacres
