= Bukovica, Sisak-Moslavina County =

Bukovica
- Village
- Location in Croatia
- Coordinates: 45°22′00″N 15°56′11″E
- Country: Croatia
- Region: Continental Croatia
- County: Sisak-Moslavina
- Municipality: Topusko

Area
  - Total: 8.9 km^{2} (3.4 sq mi)
- Elevation: 179 m (587 ft)

Population (2021)
  - Total: 0
  - Density: 0.0/km^{2} (0.0/sq mi)
- Time zone: UTC+1 (CET)
  - Summer (DST): UTC+2 (CEST)
- Postal code: 44415 Topusko
- Area code: (+385) 44

Bukovica is a village in central Croatia, in the municipality of Topusko, Sisak-Moslavina County.

== Demographics ==
According to the 2011 census, the village of Bukovica has 2 inhabitants. This represents 2.47% of its pre-war population according to the 1991 census.

The 1991 census recorded that 97.53% of the village population were ethnic Serbs (79/81), 1.23% were ethnic Croats (1/81), and 1.23% were of other ethnic origin (1/81).

Historical population 1857-2011
v

population	464	452	421	416	467	409	410	503	322	350	358	251	117	81	7	2
	1857	1869	1880	1890	1900	1910	1921	1931	1948	1953	1961	1971	1981	1991	2001	2011

Sources: Croatian Bureau of Statistics publications

== Sights ==
- Monument to the uprising of the people of Kordun and Banija

== See also ==
- Glina massacres
