= Čemernica =

Čemernica is a frequent South Slavic toponym. It may refer to:

== Places ==
- Čemernica, Croatia, a village in Croatia
- Gornja Čemernica, a village in Croatia near Topusko
- Donja Čemernica, a village in Croatia near Topusko
- Čemernica, Ilijaš, a village in Bosnia and Herzegovina
- Čemernica (Pale), a village in Bosnia and Herzegovina

== Other uses ==
- Čemernica, a river in Serbia, tributary of the West Morava
- Čemernica, a mountain in Serbia
- Čemernica, a mountain in Bosnia and Herzegovina
- Strma Čemernica, a mountain in the south of Lička Plješivica, Croatia
