= Perna, Topusko =

Perna
- Village
- Location in Croatia
- Coordinates: 45°18′00″N 15°52′00″E
- Country: Croatia
- Region: Continental Croatia
- County: Sisak-Moslavina
- Municipality: Topusko

Area
  - Total: 26.0 km^{2} (10.0 sq mi)
- Elevation: 160 m (520 ft)

Population (2021)
  - Total: 85
  - Density: 3.3/km^{2} (8.5/sq mi)
- Time zone: UTC+1 (CET)
  - Summer (DST): UTC+2 (CEST)
- Postal code: 44415 Topusko
- Area code: (+385) 44

Perna is a village in central Croatia, in the municipality of Topusko, Sisak-Moslavina County.

== Demographics ==
According to the 2011 census, the village of Perna has 176 inhabitants. This represents 37.37% of its pre-war population according to the 1991 census.

According to the 1991 census, 95.75% of the village population were ethnic Serbs (451/471), 0.22% were ethnic Croats (1/471), and 4.03% were of other ethnic origin (19/471).

Population change 1857-2011
v

| population | 1317 | 971 | 925 | 1060 | 1128 | 1221 | 1198 | 1241 | 914 | 928 | 904 | 779 | 601 | 471 | 204 | 176 |
| | 1857 | 1869 | 1880 | 1890 | 1900 | 1910 | 1921 | 1931 | 1948 | 1953 | 1961 | 1971 | 1981 | 1991 | 2001 | 2011 |

Sources: Croatian Bureau of Statistics publications

== Sights ==
- Monument to the uprising of the people of Kordun and Banija

== See also ==
- Glina massacres
