= Batinova Kosa =

- Village
- Location in Croatia
- Coordinates: 45°20′30″N 15°58′20″E
- Country: Croatia
- Region: Continental Croatia
- County: Sisak-Moslavina
- Municipality: Topusko

Area
  - Total: 9.7 km^{2} (3.7 sq mi)
- Elevation: 158 m (518 ft)

Population (2021)
  - Total: 31
  - Density: 3.2/km^{2} (8.3/sq mi)
- Time zone: UTC+1 (CET)
  - Summer (DST): UTC+2 (CEST)
- Postal code: 44415 Topusko
- Area code: (+385) 44

Batinova Kosa is a village in central Croatia, in the municipality of Topusko, Sisak-Moslavina County. It is connected by the D6 highway.

== Demographics ==
According to the 2011 census, the village of Batinova Kosa has 50 inhabitants. This represents 31.46% of its pre-war population according to the 1991 census.

The 1991 census recorded that 93.71% of the village population were ethnic Serbs (149/159), 3.15% were ethnic Croats (5/159), 3.15% were Yugoslavs (5/159), and 3.77% were of other ethnic origin (6/159).

Historical population 1857-2011
v

population	293	316	289	344	394	383	374	430	184	214	217	168	165	159	37	50
	1857	1869	1880	1890	1900	1910	1921	1931	1948	1953	1961	1971	1981	1991	2001	2011

Sources: Croatian Bureau of Statistics publications

== Sights ==
- Monument to the uprising of the people of Kordun and Banija

== See also ==
- Glina massacres
