= Crni Potok, Topusko =

Crni Potok
- Village
- Interactive map of Crni Potok
- Location in Croatia
- Coordinates: 45°15′33″N 15°56′59″E
- Country: Croatia
- Region: Continental Croatia
- County: Sisak-Moslavina
- Municipality: Topusko

Area
  - Total: 22.3 km^{2} (8.6 sq mi)
- Elevation: 132 m (433 ft)

Population (2021)
  - Total: 100
  - Density: 4.5/km^{2} (12/sq mi)
- Time zone: UTC+1 (CET)
  - Summer (DST): UTC+2 (CEST)
- Postal code: 44415 Topusko
- Area code: (+385) 44

Crni Potok is a village in central Croatia, in the municipality of Topusko, Sisak-Moslavina County.

== Demographics ==
According to the 2011 census, the village of Crni Potok has 153 inhabitants. This represents 40.58% of its pre-war population according to the 1991 census.

According to the 1991 census, 77.45% of the village population were ethnic Serbs (292/377), 16.46% were ethnic Bosniaks (62/377), 1.59% were ethnic Croats (6/377), 0.26% were Yugoslavs (1/377) and 4.24% were of other ethnic origin (16/377).

Population change 1857-2011
v

population		795	846	964	1018	1016	1013	1156	740	790	701	542	433	377	178	153
	1857	1869	1880	1890	1900	1910	1921	1931	1948	1953	1961	1971	1981	1991	2001	2011

Sources: Croatian Bureau of Statistics publications

== Sights ==
- Monument to the uprising of the people of Kordun and Banija

== See also ==
- Glina massacres
