= Semeljci =

- Municipality
- Location in Croatia Semeljci (Croatia)
- Coordinates: 45.36°N 18.54°E
- Country: Croatia
- Region: Slavonia
- County: Osijek-Baranja County

Government
  - Mayor: Grga Lončarević

Area
  - Municipality: 101.6 km^{2} (39.2 sq mi)
  - Urban: 27.0 km^{2} (10.4 sq mi)

Population (2021)
  - Municipality: 3,558
  - Density: 35.02/km^{2} (90.70/sq mi)
  - Urban: 1,025
  - Urban density: 38.0/km^{2} (98.3/sq mi)
- Time zone: UTC+1 (Central European Time)
- Website: semeljci.hr

Semeljci (Hungarian: Szemelce) is a village and a municipality in Osijek-Baranja County, Croatia.

== Population ==
In the 2011 census, the municipality had a total of 4,362 inhabitants, in the following settlements:

- Kešinci, population 834
- Koritna, population 910
- Mrzović, population 603
- Semeljci, population 1,285
- Vrbica, population 730

In the same census, 98.6% of the population were Croats.

== Name ==
The name of the village in Croatian is plural.

== Geography ==
Semeljci is located 13 kilometres (8.1 mi) east of Đakovo, and is bordered by Kešinci, Forkuševci and Koritna.

== History ==
In the 13th century, Semeljci was a large village near present-day Kešinci. In the second half of the 15th century it reverted to the possession of feudal Gorjanskis and was called Somoghka (forest).

Little is known about the village during the Ottoman era, except that it was destroyed during the Ottoman drive towards Vienna, and was rebuilt in 1698.

In 1702, Semeljci had 14 inhabited houses. By 1758, Semeljci had grown to include 95 listed houses and was one of the largest villages that made up the diocesan estate. The first church was built in 1720. The increased number of people was the main reason that the village became the seat of the Catholic parish by 1754, and the church was enlarged. By the second half of the 19th century, Germans and Hungarians moved into Semeljci, making it a large and ethnically diverse village.

The Germans left the village in 1944, and their houses were inhabited by Croats from various parts of Croatia.

In the 1960s and 1970s the Germans abandoned Bačka to buy property in Semeljci and surrounding villages throughout Đakovština. Cultural interaction with the locals was successful, but short-lived.

== Economy ==
Semeljci is one of the largest agricultural areas in Croatia. In 2005, the Croatian Chamber of Commerce awarded the Golden Kuna in the category of large enterprises to Semeljci for its achievements.

Semeljci includes crop production, an animal feed factory, a grain market, silo operations, livestock production, sorghum broom manufacturing, veterinary services and trade. There are more than 4,000 dairy cows in Ivankovo, the largest farm in Croatia.

== Culture ==
- Tamburica orchestra ”Rapsodija”

== Sources ==
- Čatić, Ivana (December 2011). "Toponimija Semeljaca – sela istočne Đakovštine" [The toponymy of Semeljci – Village of the Eastern Đakovština] (PDF). Folia Onomastica Croatica (in Croatian) (19): 47–67.
