= Staro Selo Topusko =

- Village
- Location in Croatia
- Coordinates: 45°15′33″N 15°56′59″E
- Country: Croatia
- Region: Continental Croatia
- County: Sisak-Moslavina
- Municipality: Topusko

Area
  - Total: 20.0 km^{2} (7.7 sq mi)
- Elevation: 132 m (433 ft)

Population (2021)
  - Total: 95
  - Density: 4.8/km^{2} (12/sq mi)
- Time zone: UTC+1 (CET)
  - Summer (DST): UTC+2 (CEST)
- Postal code: 44415 Topusko
- Area code: (+385) 44

Staro Selo Topusko is a village in central Croatia, in the municipality of Topusko, Sisak-Moslavina County.

== History ==
During World War II, a large number of Serbs were massacred in the village by the Ustaše regime in June and July 1941.

== Demographics ==
According to the 2011 census, the village of Staro Selo Topusko has 154 inhabitants. This represents 38.31% of its pre-war population according to the 1991 census.

According to the 1991 census, of the village population were ethnic Croats and minority Serbs and other ethnic origin.

Population change 1857-2011
v

population	439	799	825	956	1204	1277	1325	1428	927	938	871	666	497	402	191	154
	1857	1869	1880	1890	1900	1910	1921	1931	1948	1953	1961	1971	1981	1991	2001	2011

Sources: Croatian Bureau of Statistics publications

== Sights ==
- Monument to the uprising of the people of Kordun and Banija

== See also ==
- Glina massacres
