= Mrzović =

Coordinates: 45°19′37″N 18°35′32″E

- Village (Selo)
- Interactive map of Mrzović

Mrzović is a village near Semeljci, Croatia. In the 2011 census, it had 603 inhabitants.
