= Donja Čemernica =

Donja Čemernica Доња Чемерница (Serbian)
- Village
- Location in Croatia
- Coordinates: 45°19′11″N 15°57′12″E
- Country: Croatia
- Region: Continental Croatia
- County: Sisak-Moslavina
- Municipality: Topusko

Area
  - Total: 12.7 km^{2} (4.9 sq mi)
- Elevation: 153 m (502 ft)

Population (2021)
  - Total: 92
  - Density: 7.2/km^{2} (19/sq mi)
- Time zone: UTC+1 (CET)
  - Summer (DST): UTC+2 (CEST)
- Postal code: 44415 Topusko
- Area code: (+385) 44

Donja Čemernica (Serbian Cyrillic: Доња Чемерница) is a village in central Croatia, in the municipality of Topusko, Sisak-Moslavina County. It is connected by the D6 highway.

== History ==
The village of Čemernica (comprising Gornja Čemernica and Donja Čemernica) suffered heavy demographic losses in World War II, losing 586 of its residents, 295 of whom perished in the Glina massacre on 3 August 1941. A further 68 of its residents perished in the Jasenovac concentration camp.

== Demographics ==
According to the 2011 census, the village of Donja Čemernica has 170 inhabitants. This represents 37.69% of its pre-war population according to the 1991 census.

The 1991 census recorded that 94.68% of the village population were ethnic Serbs (427/451), 0.66% were ethnic Croats (3/451), and 4.66% were of other ethnic origin (21/451).

Historical population 1857-2011
v

population	1223	1074	1092	663	648	739	746	734	503	541	522	471	440	451	199	170
	1857	1869	1880	1890	1900	1910	1921	1931	1948	1953	1961	1971	1981	1991	2001	2011

Sources: Croatian Bureau of Statistics publications

NOTE: Data for settlements of 'Donja Čemernica' and Gornja Čemernica (which currently belongs to the municipality of Gvozd) was reported separately from 1890 onwards. From 1857 to 1880, data was reported for a single settlement of Čemernica. The data pertaining to former settlement of Čemernica is now contained within the data for the settlement of Donja Čemernica.

== Sights ==
- Monument to the uprising of the people of Kordun and Banija
- Partisan Airfield Čemernica was one of 34 partisan airfields (850m long airstrip) used in World war II in Yugoslavia. The first plane, which landed on 22 July 1944, evacuated 18 badly wounded partisans along with 26 children to Bari, Italy. One of many notable passengers who landed at the Čemernica Airfield was Randolph Churchill, who established the British military mission at Topusko on 16 September 1944.

== See also ==
- Glina massacres
