= Dekanovec =

- Municipality
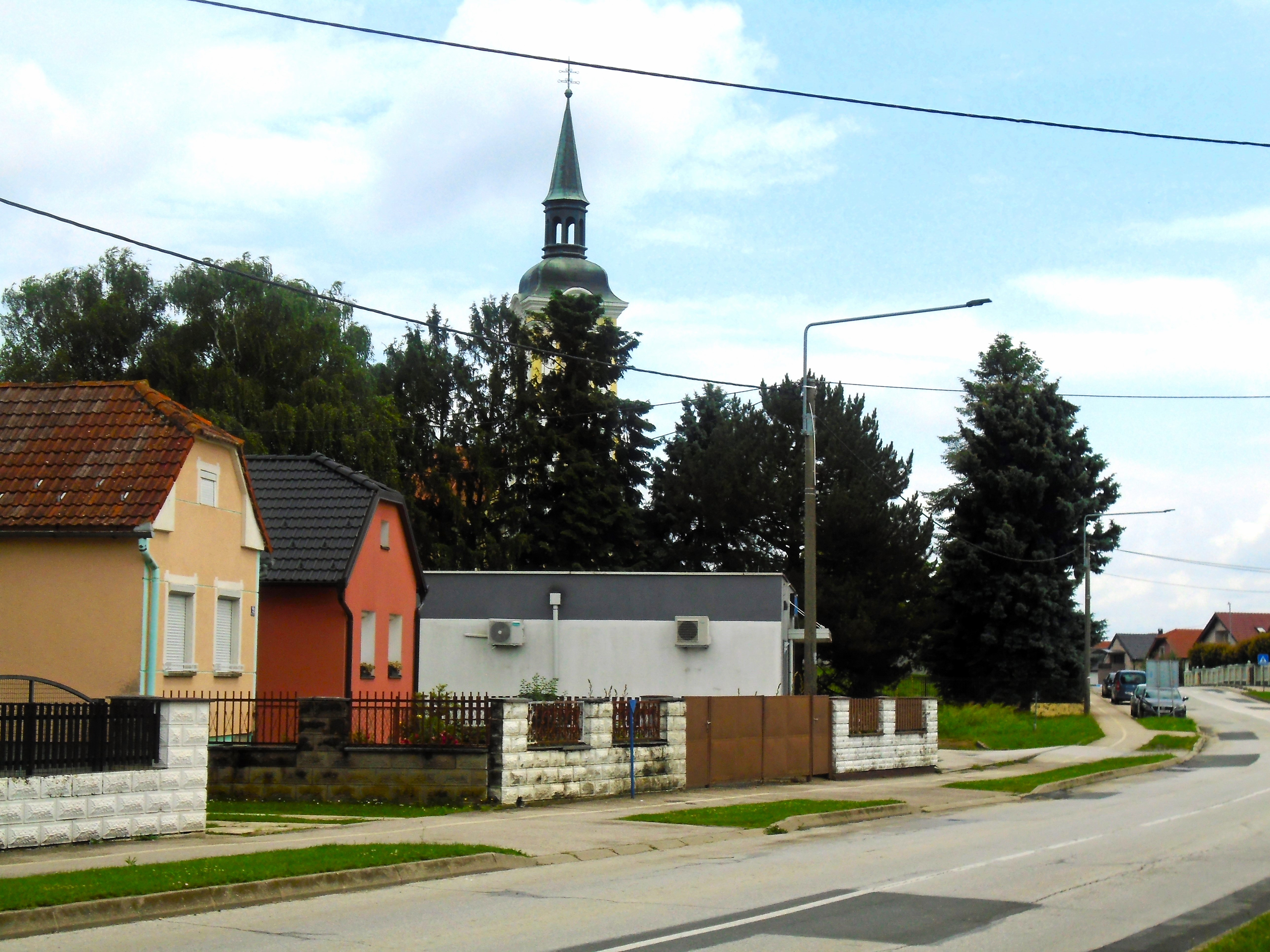

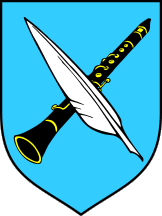
- Coat of arms

- Location within Croatia
- Coordinates: 46°27′N 16°35′E
- Country: Croatia
- Region: Northern Croatia (Međimurje)
- County: Međimurje County

Government
  - Municipal mayor: Ivan Hajdarović (HDZ)

Area
  - Municipality: 6.0 km^{2} (2.3 sq mi)
  - Urban: 6.0 km^{2} (2.3 sq mi)

Population (2021)
  - Municipality: 739
  - Density: 120/km^{2} (320/sq mi)
  - Urban: 739
  - Urban density: 120/km^{2} (320/sq mi)
- Time zone: UTC+1 (CET)
  - Summer (DST): UTC+2 (CEST)
- Postal code: 40318 Dekanovec
- Website: dekanovec.hr

Dekanovec (Hungarian: Dékánfalva) is a village and municipality in Međimurje County, Croatia. It is by territory the smallest municipality in Croatia. It is located between Novakovec and Domašinec, around 14 kilometres north-east of Čakovec, the seat and largest city of Međimurje County. The Mura River and borders with both Hungary and Slovenia are also close to the village.

== Demographics ==
According to the 2021 census, the Dekanovec municipality had a total population of 739. Dekanovec is the only village in the municipality.

Dekanovec: Population trends 1857–2021
v

population	494	600	651	740	738	867	944	1005	1141	1170	1020	987	963	941	832	774	739
	1857	1869	1880	1890	1900	1910	1921	1931	1948	1953	1961	1971	1981	1991	2001	2011	2021

Sources: Croatian Bureau of Statistics publications

== Administration ==
The current mayor of Dekanovec is Ivan Hajdarović (HDZ) and the Dekanovec Municipal Council consists of 7 seats.

Groups	Councilors per group
HDZ	5 / 7
NPS-SDP	2 / 7
