= Kozarac, Osijek-Baranja County =

Kozarac
- Village (Selo)
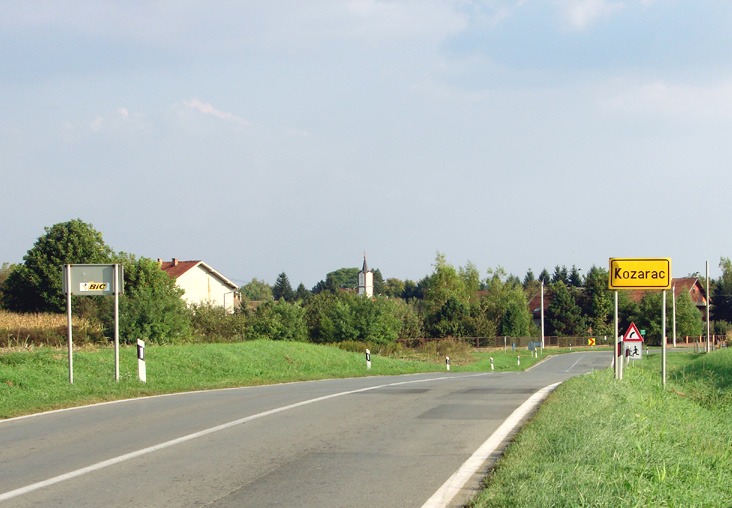

- Location within Croatia
- Coordinates: 45°43′08″N 18°40′34″E
- Country: Croatia
- Region: Baranya (Podunavlje)
- County: Osijek-Baranja
- Municipality: Čeminac

Area
  - Total: 8.2 km^{2} (3.2 sq mi)

Population (2021)
  - Total: 615
  - Density: 75/km^{2} (190/sq mi)
- Time zone: UTC+1 (CET)
  - Summer (DST): UTC+2 (CEST)

Kozarac (Hungarian: Keskend, Serbian Cyrillic: Козарац, German: Geisdorf) is a village in Croatia. Administratively, it is located in the Čeminac municipality within the Osijek-Baranja County. Population is 789 people.
