= Vorkapić =

Vorkapić (Serbian: Воркапић) is a surname distributed on the territory of Croatia and Serbia. The surname Vorkapić (including: Vorkapich, Vorkapic, Forkapic) in lower amount is present in 14 world countries on three continents.

It is most prevalent in Serbia and is the surname of approximately 1,741 people.

Notable people with the surname include:

- Slavko Vorkapić (1894–1976), film director and editor
- Jasna Vorkapić-Furač (born 1942), a scientist
- Vlatka Vorkapic (born 1969), movie director
- Đurđica Vorkapić, designer and owner of the "Hippy Garden" fashion brand
- Ljubomir Vorkapić (born 1967), football player
