= Strelec =

Surname list

Strelec is a Slovak surname. Notable people with the surname include:

- David Strelec (born 2001), Slovak footballer
- Milan Strelec (born 1972), Slovak footballer
- Marián Strelec (born 1971) Slovak footballer
