= Turčišće =

- Village
- Location within Croatia
- Coordinates: 46°24′43″N 16°37′01″E
- Country: Croatia
- County: Međimurje County
- Municipality: Domašinec

Area
  - Total: 5.8 km^{2} (2.2 sq mi)

Population (2021)
  - Total: 467
  - Density: 81/km^{2} (210/sq mi)
- Time zone: UTC+1 (CET)
  - Summer (DST): UTC+2 (CEST)
- Postal code: 40318 Dekanovec

Turčišće (Hungarian: Törökudvar) is a village in Croatia.
