= Hrvatsko Selo =

- Village
- Interactive map of Hrvatsko Selo
- Location within Croatia
- Coordinates: 45°18′N 16°0′E
- Country: Croatia
- County: Sisak-Moslavina County
- Municipality: Topusko

Area
  - Total: 7.6 km^{2} (2.9 sq mi)

Population (2021)
  - Total: 242
  - Density: 32/km^{2} (82/sq mi)
- Time zone: UTC+1 (CET)
  - Summer (DST): UTC+2 (CEST)

Hrvatsko Selo is a village in Croatian municipality of Topusko.
