= Banski Grabovac massacre =

WW2 Massacre event

- Part of World War II in Yugoslavia
- Location: Banski Grabovac, Independent State of Croatia
- Date: 24-25 July 1941
- Target: Serbs
- Attack type: Summary executions
- Deaths: 1,100–1,200
- Perpetrator: Ustaše

The Banski Grabovac massacre was the mass killing of 1,100-1,200 Serb civilians by the Croatian fascist Ustaše movement on 24-25 July 1941, during World War II.

After the Axis invasion of Yugoslavia, Adolf Hitler set up the Independent State of Croatia (NDH), a puppet state ruled by the fascist Croatian Ustaše regime led by Ante Pavelić. The Ustaše then embarked on a campaign of genocide against the Serb, Jewish and Roma population within the borders of the state.

The massacre occurred after acts of resistance against the NDH by armed Serbian peasants. The first major clash between the Ustaše and anti-fascists in the territory of Croatia took place in the village of Banski Grabovac on 23-24 July, when 42 rebels charged a municipal building and train station, seizing more than 50 rifles. On 24-25 July, the Ustaše captured the village and arrested more than 1,200 Serbs from surrounding villages. Approximately 800 people were shot and killed on the spot while others were taken to the Jadovno concentration camp and killed there. Nearly the entire village's Serb population was annihilated. Those killed on location were buried in mass graves near the village's station.
