= Grabovac, Osijek-Baranja County =

Coordinates: 45°41′42″N 18°44′34″E

Grabovac
- Village (Selo)
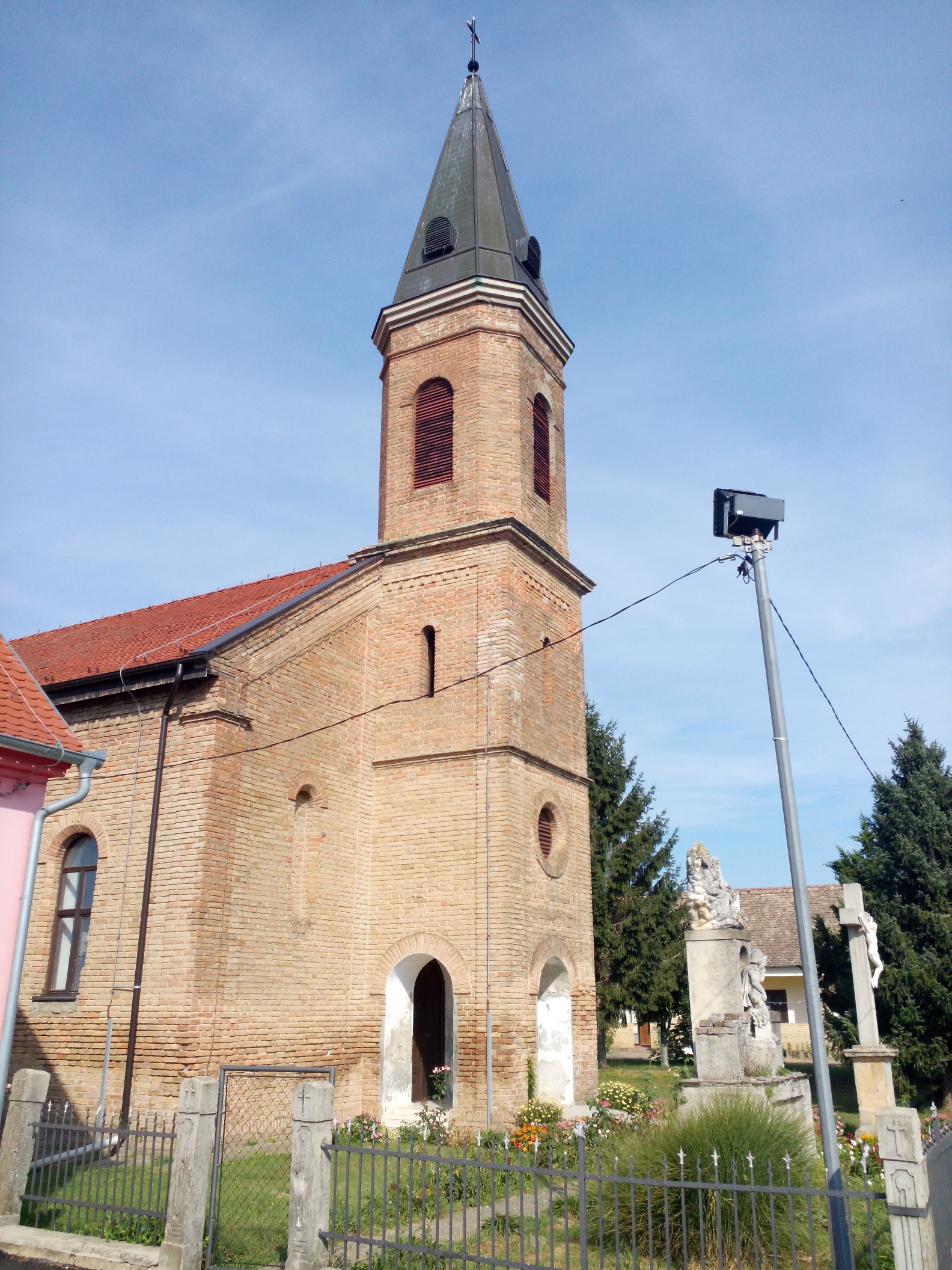
- Church of St. Martin in Grabovci.
- Interactive map of Grabovac
- Country: Croatia
- County: Osijek-Baranja
- Municipality: Čeminac

Area
  - Total: 16.1 km^{2} (6.2 sq mi)

Population (2021)
  - Total: 736
  - Density: 45.7/km^{2} (118/sq mi)

Grabovac (Hungarian: Albertfalu, Serbian Cyrillic: Грабовац, German: Albertsdorf) is a settlement in the region of Baranja in Croatia. It is in Čeminac municipality in Osijek-Baranja County. In 2011 its population was 872.

== History ==
The DVD u gospodarstvu Belje-Brestovac was founded in 1952.
