= Mitrovac, Osijek-Baranja County =

Mitrovac
- Village (Selo)
- Nickname: Mitvar
- Location within Osijek-Baranja County Location within Croatia Location within Europe
- Country: Croatia
- County: Osijek-Baranja
- Municipality: Čeminac

Area
  - Total: 0.4 km^{2} (0.15 sq mi)

Population (2021)
  - Total: 16
  - Density: 40/km^{2} (100/sq mi)

Mitrovac (Hungarian: Mitvárpuszta, Serbian Cyrillic: Митровац) is a settlement in the region of Baranja, Croatia. Administratively, it is located in the Čeminac municipality within the Osijek-Baranja County. Population is 15 people.

== See also ==
- Osijek-Baranja county
- Baranja
