= Grabovac Banski =

- Village
- Location of Grabovac Banski in Croatia
- Coordinates: 45°19′51″N 16°14′18″E
- Country: Croatia
- Region: Continental Croatia (Banovina)
- County: Sisak-Moslavina
- Municipality: Petrinja

Area
  - Total: 7.4 km^{2} (2.9 sq mi)
- Elevation: 215 m (705 ft)

Population (2021)
  - Total: 127
  - Density: 17/km^{2} (44/sq mi)
- Time zone: UTC+1 (CET)
  - Summer (DST): UTC+2 (CEST)
- Postal code: 44204 Jabukovac
- Area code: (+385) 044

Grabovac Banski is a village in central Croatia, in the Town of Petrinja, Sisak-Moslavina County. It is connected by the D30 highway.

== History ==
On 23 July 1941, the first armed action by the antifascist partisans in the Banija region, and in Croatia, was conducted in Banski Grabovac, under the leadership of Vasilj Gaćeša. In Ustaša reprisals against the civilian population that followed shortly after, about 1200 civilians were killed in the Banski Grabovac massacre. There are two monuments in this area: the Monument of the Uprising and the Monument to the Victims of Fascism, by Petar Salopek, featuring the lyrics of Croatian poet Jure Kaštelan.

== Demographics ==
According to the 2011 census, the village of Grabovac Banski has 200 inhabitants, representing 36.23% of its pre-war population according to the 1991 census.

Per the 1991 census, 88.04% of the village population were ethnic Serbs (486/552), 4.71% were ethnic Croats (26/552), 5.62% were Yugoslavs (31/552), while 1.63% were of other ethnic origin (9/552).

Population change 1857-2011
v

population	478	366	391	522	646	728	711	819	591	623	689	661	570	552	223	200
	1857	1869	1880	1890	1900	1910	1921	1931	1948	1953	1961	1971	1981	1991	2001	2011

Sources: Croatian Bureau of Statistics publications

== Sights ==
- The Monument of the Uprising and the Monument to the Victims of Fascism, by Petar Salopek, featuring the lyrics of Croatian poet Jure Kaštelan.
