= Čeminac =

- Municipality
- Municipality of Čeminac; Općina Čeminac
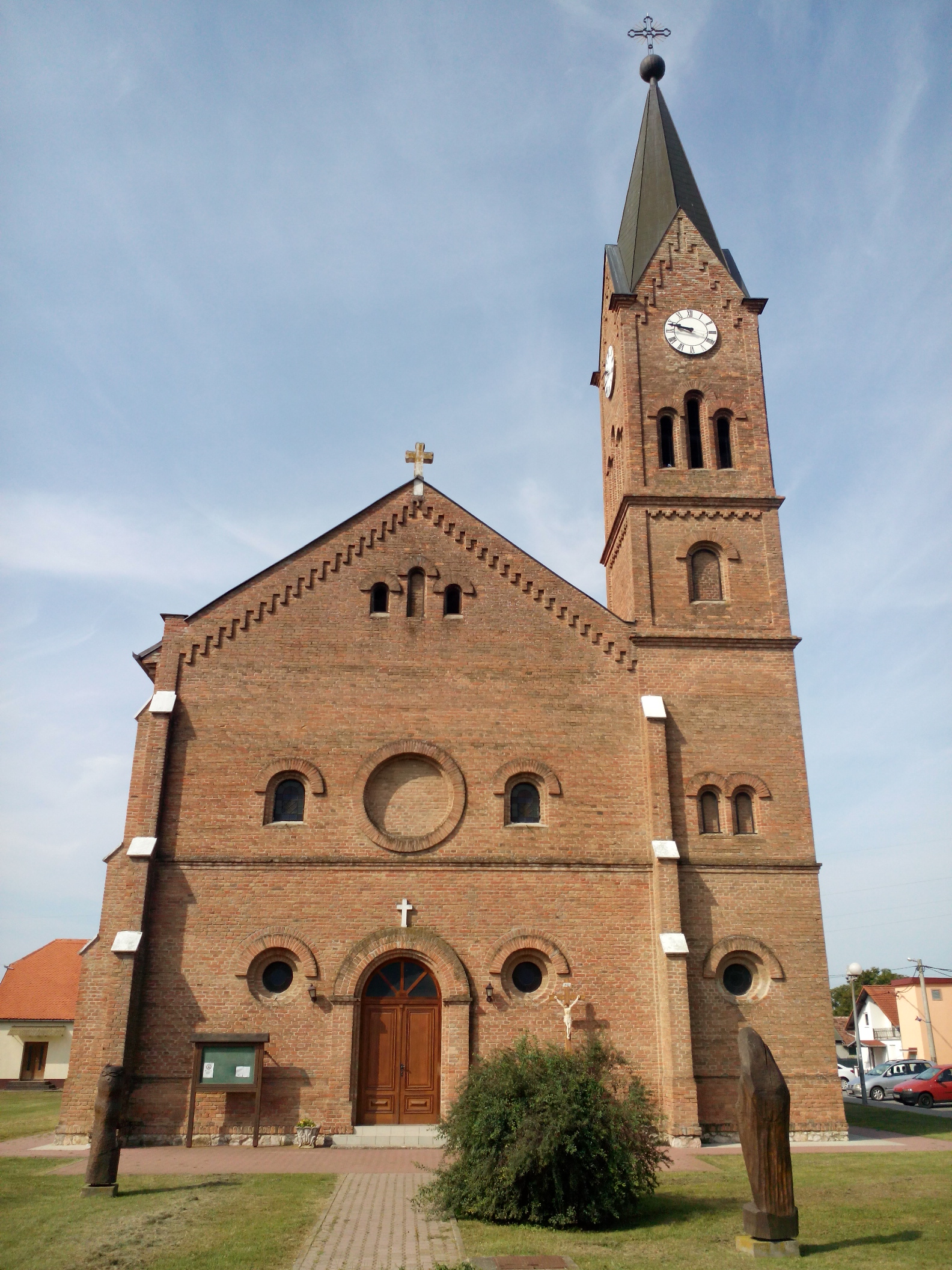

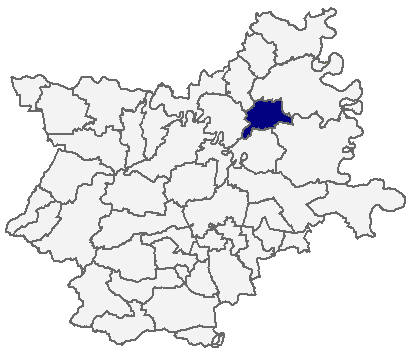
- Map of Čeminac municipality within the Osijek-Baranja County

- Location in Croatia Čeminac (Croatia) Čeminac (Europe)
- Coordinates: 45°41′11″N 18°40′3″E
- Country: Croatia
- Region: Baranja (Podunavlje)
- County: Osijek-Baranja County

Government
  - Mayor: Damir Rešetar

Area
  - Municipality: 61.4 km^{2} (23.7 sq mi)
  - Urban: 22.1 km^{2} (8.5 sq mi)

Population (2021)
  - Municipality: 2,484
  - Density: 40.5/km^{2} (105/sq mi)
  - Urban: 865
  - Urban density: 39.1/km^{2} (101/sq mi)
- Time zone: UTC+1 (CET)
  - Summer (DST): UTC+2 (CEST)
- Website: ceminac.hr

Čeminac (Hungarian: Laskafalu, Serbian Cyrillic: Чеминац, German: Laschkafeld) is a village and municipality in Osijek-Baranja County, Croatia. As of 2021, there were 2,856 inhabitants in the municipality. Čeminac is an underdeveloped municipality which is statistically classified as the First Category Area of Special State Concern by the Government of Croatia.

== Geography ==
Čeminac is located in the central part of Croatian Baranja and it is surrounded by the municipalities of: Jagodnjak, Beli Manastir, Kneževi Vinogradi, Bilje, and Darda.

The municipality of Čeminac includes the following settlements:

- Čeminac
- Grabovac
- Kozarac
- Mitrovac
- Novi Čeminac

== History ==
This Village was established by the Danube Swabians (Schwowe) in 1720 from Fulda and Eisfeld, locally also called Stifolder. Colonist settlement of Krčevina was established on the territory of the village municipality during the land reform in interwar Yugoslavia. Čeminac area was home to a sizeable Danube Swabians population before the end of World War II. With the Red Army's crossing of the Danube at Batina most of these Germans left, and their property was confiscated by Communist Yugoslavia's government.

== Demographics ==
There are 3,500 inhabitants in 1,100 households living in the area of Čeminac.

Ethnic groups in the municipality (2011 census):

- 88.24% Croats
- 5.91% Serbs
- 3.09% Hungarians
- 0.93% Germans

== Politics ==
=== Minority councils ===
Directly elected minority councils and representatives are tasked with consulting the local or regional authorities, advocating for minority rights and interests, integration into public life and participation in the management of local affairs. At the 2023 Croatian national minorities councils and representatives elections Hungarians and Serbs of Croatia each fulfilled legal requirements to elect 10 members municipal minority councils of the Čeminac Municipality but the elections were not held for either one of them due to the lack of candidates.

== Coat of arms ==
The coat of arms of Čeminac is Azure a Lion rampant double-queued Or holding a Plough-share Argent.
