= Novi Čeminac =

- Village (Selo)
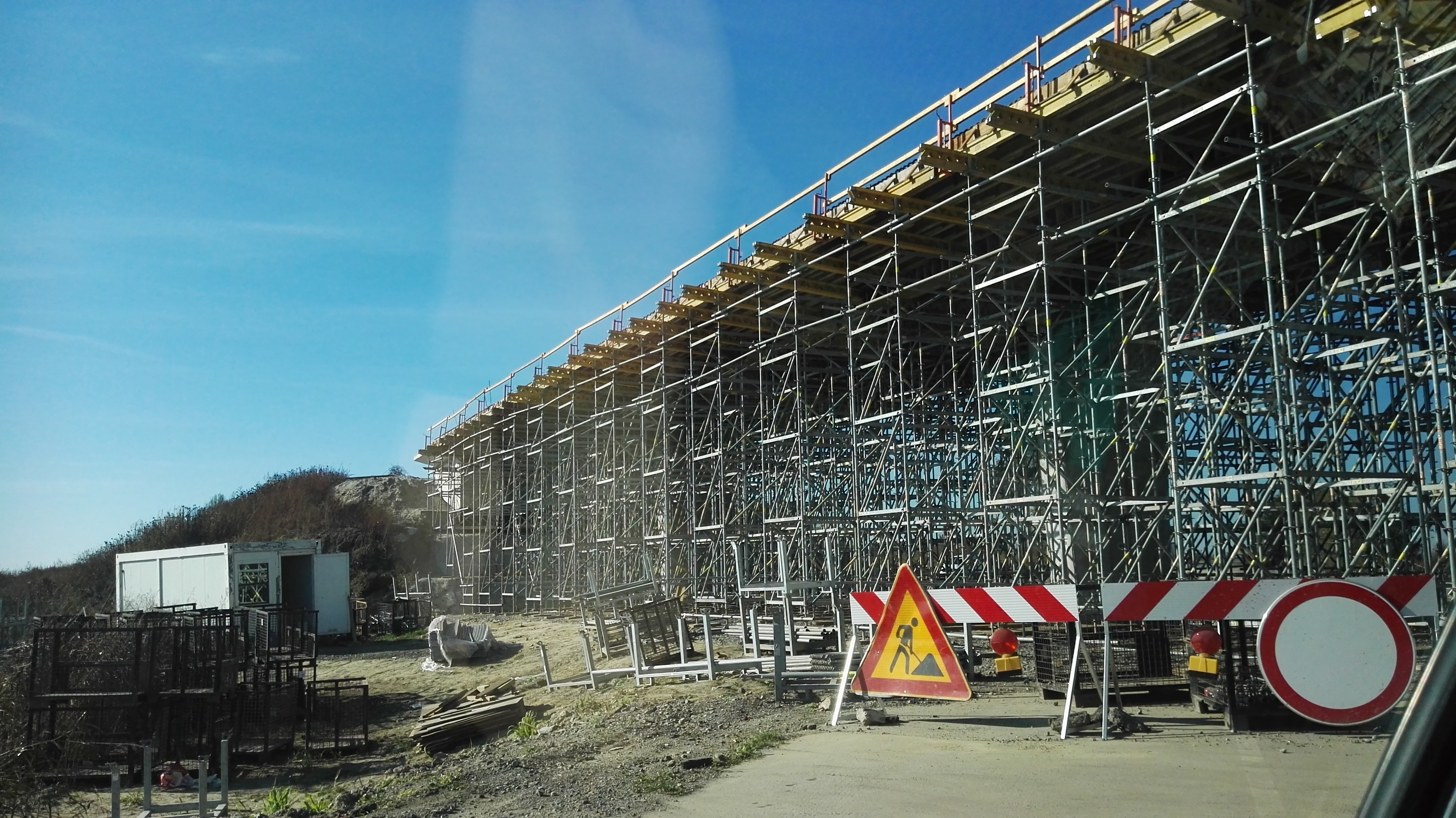

- Location within Osijek-Baranja County Location within Croatia Location within Europe
- Country: Croatia
- County: Osijek-Baranja
- Municipality: Čeminac

Area
  - Total: 14.7 km^{2} (5.7 sq mi)

Population (2021)
  - Total: 252
  - Density: 17.1/km^{2} (44.4/sq mi)

Novi Čeminac (Hungarian: Újlaskafalu, Serbian Cyrillic: Нови Чеминац German: Neu-Laschkafeld) is a settlement in the region of Baranja, Croatia. Administratively, it is located in the Čeminac municipality within the Osijek-Baranja County. Population is 319 people.

== See also ==
- Osijek-Baranja County
- Baranja
