= Katinovac =

Katinovac Катиновац (Serbian)
- Village
- Location of Katinovac in Croatia
- Coordinates: 45°14′36″N 15°55′31″E
- Country: Croatia
- Region: Continental Croatia
- County: Sisak-Moslavina County
- Municipality: Topusko

Area
  - Total: 12.6 km^{2} (4.9 sq mi)
- Elevation: 146 m (479 ft)

Population (2021)
  - Total: 56
  - Density: 4.4/km^{2} (12/sq mi)
- Time zone: UTC+1 (CET)
  - Summer (DST): UTC+2 (CEST)
- Postal code: 44415 Topusko
- Area code: (+385) 44

Katinovac (Serbian Cyrillic: Катиновац) is a village in central Croatia, in the municipality of Topusko, Sisak-Moslavina County.

== Demographics ==
According to the 2011 census, the village of Katinovac has 90 inhabitants. This represents 25.79% of its pre-war population according to the 1991 census.

According to the 1991 census, 88.83% of the village population were ethnic Serbs (310/349), 0.86% were Yugoslavs (3/349), 0.57% were ethic Croats (2/349), 7.45% were Bosniaks (26/349) and 2.29% were of other ethnic origin (8/349).

Population change 1857-2011
v

| population | 425 | 726 | 779 | 825 | 880 | 870 | 905 | 979 | 582 | 600 | 631 | 547 | 451 | 349 | 114 | 90 |
| | 1857 | 1869 | 1880 | 1890 | 1900 | 1910 | 1921 | 1931 | 1948 | 1953 | 1961 | 1971 | 1981 | 1991 | 2001 | 2011 |

Sources: Croatian Bureau of Statistics publications
