= Malička =

- Village
- Location in Croatia
- Coordinates: 45°17′57″N 15°50′50″E
- Country: Croatia
- Region: Continental Croatia
- County: Sisak-Moslavina
- Municipality: Topusko

Area
  - Total: 10.1 km^{2} (3.9 sq mi)
- Elevation: 172 m (564 ft)

Population (2021)
  - Total: 18
  - Density: 1.8/km^{2} (4.6/sq mi)
- Time zone: UTC+1 (CET)
  - Summer (DST): UTC+2 (CEST)
- Postal code: 44415 Topusko
- Area code: (+385) 44

Malička is a village in central Croatia, in the municipality of Topusko, Sisak-Moslavina County.

== Demographics ==
According to the 2011 census, the village of Malička has 43 inhabitants. This represents 33.33% of its pre-war population according to the 1991 census.

According to the 1991 census, 97.67% of the village population were ethnic Serbs (126/129), 0.78% were ethnic Croats (1/129) and 1.55% were Yugoslavs (2/129).

Population change 1857-2011
v

population	329	330	314	377	362	422	431	397	325	305	254	214	161	129	48	43
	1857	1869	1880	1890	1900	1910	1921	1931	1948	1953	1961	1971	1981	1991	2001	2011

Sources: Croatian Bureau of Statistics publications

== Sights ==
- Monument to the uprising of the people of Kordun and Banija
