= Koritna, Osijek-Baranja County =

Koritna
- Village (Selo)
- Location within Osijek-Baranja County Location within Croatia Location within Europe
- Coordinates: 45°23′04″N 18°33′45″E
- Country: Croatia
- County: Osijek-Baranja County

Area
  - Total: 8.4 sq mi (21.7 km^{2})

Population (2021)
  - Total: 767
  - Density: 91.5/sq mi (35.3/km^{2})
- Time zone: UTC+1 (CET)
  - Summer (DST): UTC+2 (CEST)

Koritna is a village in Croatia.
