= Domašinec =

- Municipality
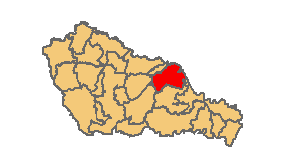
- Location within Međimurje County

- Location within Croatia
- Coordinates: 46°26′N 16°36′E
- Country: Croatia
- Region: Northern Croatia (Međimurje)
- County: Međimurje County

Government
  - Municipal mayor: Goran Koren (HNS)

Area
  - Municipality: 35.3 km^{2} (13.6 sq mi)
  - Urban: 29.5 km^{2} (11.4 sq mi)

Population (2021)
  - Municipality: 1,923
  - Density: 54.5/km^{2} (141/sq mi)
  - Urban: 1,456
  - Urban density: 49.4/km^{2} (128/sq mi)
- Time zone: UTC+1 (CET)
  - Summer (DST): UTC+2 (CEST)
- Postal code: 40318 Dekanovec
- Website: domasinec.hr

Domašinec (Hungarian: Damása) is a village and municipality in Međimurje County, Croatia. It is located around 14 kilometres east of Čakovec, the seat and largest city of Međimurje County, and close to the Mura River and border with Hungary.

== History ==
Clay vessels from the late Iron Age have been found in the area of the Domašinec municipality. They are a sign of the existence of a cemetery of flat graves of the La Tène culture.

Domašinec was first mentioned in 1244 when a nobleman Petrina is named as the owner of an estate named Damasa. In 1349, the Damas estate between the Mura and Drava rivers in Zala County was mentioned. The current name Domašinec was first mentioned in 1478. In 1672, Domašinec was the seat of one of the 13 Međimurje judicatures (administrative centers). The first known official census, conducted in 1786, shows that Domašinac had 811 inhabitants, or 110 families living in 109 houses.

== Demographics ==
In the 2021 census, the municipality of Domašinec had a population of 1,923 in the following settlements:

- Domašinec, population 1,456
- Turčišće, population 467
Domašinec: Population trends 1857–2021
v

population	1763	1971	2228	2470	2452	2891	2815	2965	3171	3180	2958	2946	2743	2590	2459	2251	1923
	1857	1869	1880	1890	1900	1910	1921	1931	1948	1953	1961	1971	1981	1991	2001	2011	2021

Sources: Croatian Bureau of Statistics publications

== Administration ==
The current mayor of Domašinec is Goran Koren (HNS) and the Domašinec Municipal Council consists of 9 seats.

Groups	Councilors per group
HSS-SDP-HNS	3 / 9
NPS	3 / 9
Independents	2 / 9
HDZ	1 / 9
