= Kešinci =

- Village (Selo)
- Location within Osijek-Baranja County Location within Croatia Location within Europe
- Country: Croatia

Area
  - Total: 22.3 km^{2} (8.6 sq mi)

Population (2021)
  - Total: 648
  - Density: 29.1/km^{2} (75.3/sq mi)
- Time zone: UTC+1 (CET)
  - Summer (DST): UTC+2 (CEST)

Kešinci is a village in Croatia.
