= Topusko =

- Commune
- Općina Topusko; Topusko Municipality
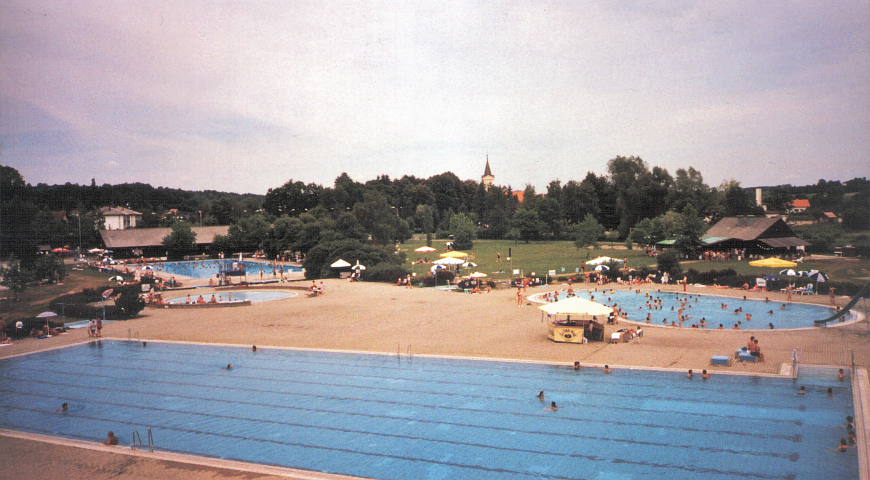
- Topusko spa resort with St. Mary's church in the background

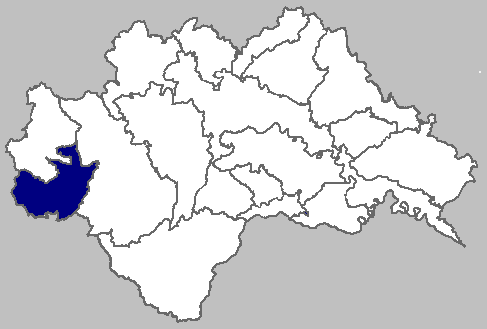
- Location of Topusko Municipality within Sisak-Moslavina County
- Interactive map of Topusko
- Location of Topusko in Croatia
- Coordinates: 45°17′35″N 15°58′20″E
- Country: Croatia
- County: Sisak-Moslavina County

Area
  - Commune: 198.7 km^{2} (76.7 sq mi)
  - Urban: 3.3 km^{2} (1.3 sq mi)
- Elevation: 130 m (430 ft)

Population (2021)
  - Commune: 2,222
  - Density: 11.18/km^{2} (28.96/sq mi)
  - Urban: 878
  - Urban density: 270/km^{2} (690/sq mi)
- Time zone: UTC+1 (CET)
  - Summer (DST): UTC+2 (CEST)
- Website: topusko.hr

Topusko is a municipality and settlement in Sisak-Moslavina County, Croatia. Topusko is an underdeveloped municipality which is statistically classified as the First Category Area of Special State Concern by the Government of Croatia.

== Climate ==
Between 1981 and 2019, the highest temperature recorded at the local weather station was 39.8 °C (103.6 °F), on 24 August 2012. The coldest temperature was −27.5 °C (−17.5 °F), on 12 January 1985.

== Demographics ==
The population of Topusko itself is 945, with a total of 2,985 people in the municipality (census 2011). There are 1865 Croats (62.48%), 893 Serbs (22.27%) and 139 Bosniaks (4.66%).

The 1991 census recorded that 63.89% of the population of Topusko settlement were ethnic Serbs (1014/1587), 26.15% were Croats (415/1587), 6.36% were Yugoslavs (101/1587) while 3.59% were of other ethnic origin (57/1587).

Municipality of Topusko: Population trends 1857–2021
v

population	9148	9945	9793	10688	11493	12090	12067	13070	10123	10435	9746	8513	7320	6824	3219	2985	2222
	1857	1869	1880	1890	1900	1910	1921	1931	1948	1953	1961	1971	1981	1991	2001	2011	2021

Sources: Croatian Bureau of Statistics publications
Topusko: Population trends 1857–2021
v

population	84			133	153	280	449	408	580	662	793	1057	1432	1587	798	945	878
	1857	1869	1880	1890	1900	1910	1921	1931	1948	1953	1961	1971	1981	1991	2001	2011	2021

Note:The 1869 and 1880 population data is included in the population data of Ponikvari. Sources: Croatian Bureau of Statistics publications

=== Settlements ===
In 2021, the municipality had 2222 residents in the following 16 settlements:

- Batinova Kosa, population 31
- Bukovica, population 0
- Crni Potok, population 100
- Donja Čemernica, population 92
- Gređani, population 253
- Hrvatsko Selo, population 242
- Katinovac, population 56
- Mala Vranovina, population 0
- Malička, population 18
- Pecka, population 9
- Perna, population 85
- Ponikvari, population 229
- Staro Selo Topusko, population 95
- Topusko, population 878
- Velika Vranovina, population 124
- Vorkapić, population 10

== Politics ==
=== Minority councils and representatives ===
Directly elected minority councils and representatives are tasked with consulting tasks for the local or regional authorities in which they are advocating for minority rights and interests, integration into public life and participation in the management of local affairs. At the 2023 Croatian national minorities councils and representatives elections Serbs of Croatia fulfilled legal requirements to elect 10 members minority council of the Municipality of Topusko.

== History ==
=== Prehistory and Antiquity ===
The first traces of humans in the Topusko area were found around 2,500 B.C. Numerous idols, fragments of ceramic dishes were found. Through the millennia, the Illyrians, the Celts, and most of all, the Romans testified to their existence and their fascination with this area of impulsive vivacity, and they made a statio, called Ad Fines.

The excavation of pre-historical artifacts shows that Topusko and its surroundings were inhabited in the Neolithic (8-5 ct. BC). The line of the monuments built in the honour of the Illyrian divinities Vidas and Thiana (Thana), points to the presence of the Illyrians (tribes the Japodes and the Kolapijans, 3,000 years BC). In the area of Topusko we can also find traces of some other peoples, for example the Celts, the Goths, the French, the Hungarians etc.

The real development of Topusko begins after the arrival of the Romans. An important event in the history of Topusko would be the building of the Roman road Via Eksecirtualis, which in turn sparked the creation of the Roman colony Ad Fines, which ultimately turned into modern day Topusko. The remnants of the architecture, the devices for heating the houses with hot water, the painted walls of the houses, the discovered altars dedicated to the Roman and domestic divinities, the grave-monuments, tools, ornaments, money (which was thrown into the thermal springs) are valuable artifacts that tell us about the persistence of the colony through the whole antiquity.

=== Middle Ages ===
Topusko flourishes again in 1192 as a thermal resort in the time of Andrew II of Hungary, who in the time of his reign built a magnificent chapel of the Blessed Virgin Mary of Pohod in a Gothic style. Its dilapidated front is being kept with all its monumentality in the park "Opatovina". This Cistercian portal today has the status of the unique symbol of Topusko.

King Andrew II goes to the holy war to Jerusalem at the beginning of the 13th century, and makes a vow that in case he comes back he will build a monastery and an abbey in Topusko, in token of gratitude. In 1233 he finishes the chapel and monastery and gives them to the Cistercians. This is their first monastery in Croatia, and the edifice itself is the first one built in Gothic style in the area south from France. The three hundred year dominance of the Cistercians began to weaken in wars with the Turks, who broke towards Vienna through these areas. Under the leadership of the Bosnian pasha Makoc beg, the Turkish troops destroyed the abbey in 1558. Only the front of that monumental edifice remained.

=== 18th century to the present ===
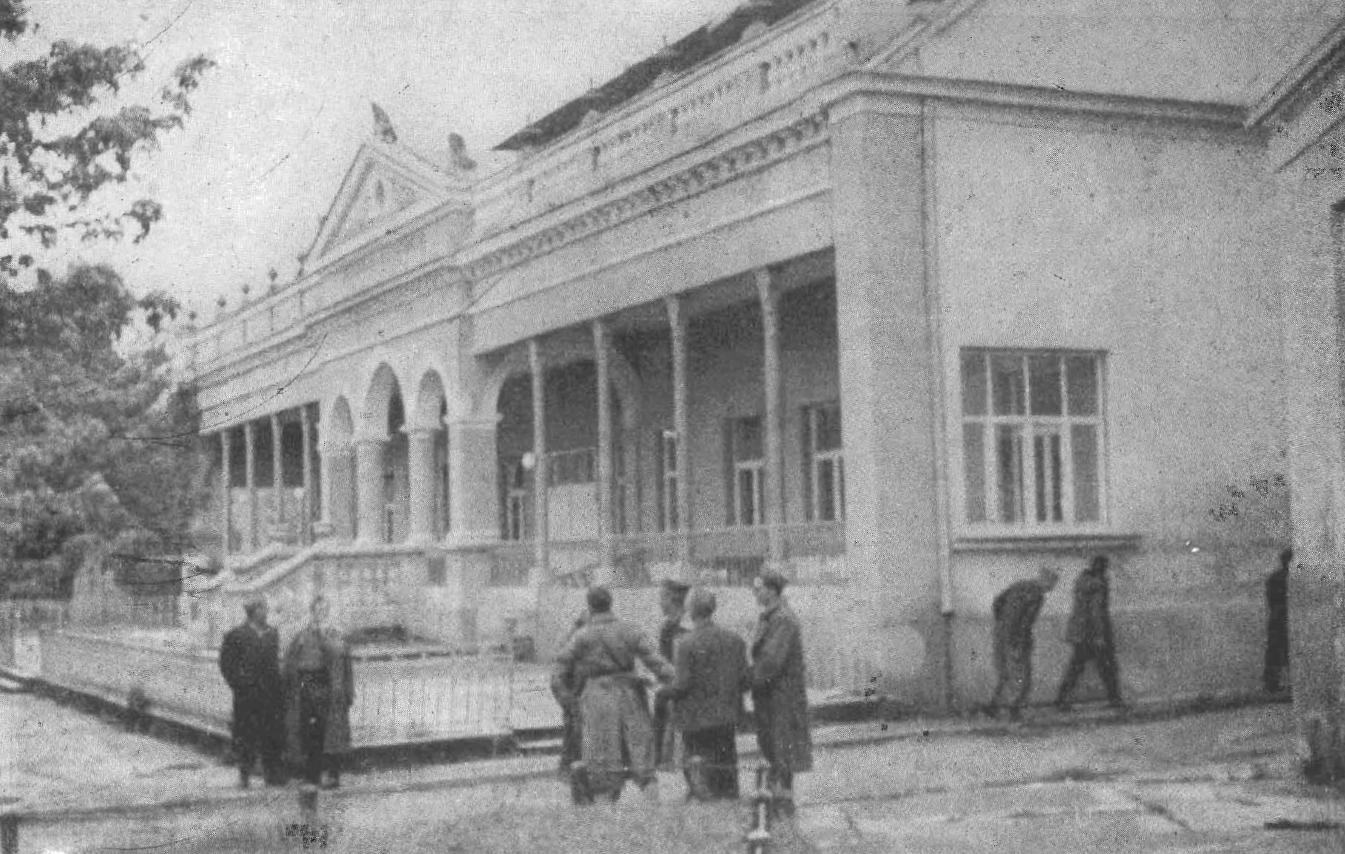
Topusko spa restaurant building at the time of the third session of the ZAVNOH.

In the year 1784 Topusko and the abbey belong to the Croatian Military Border and remains under its conduct for about a hundred years. The real development of Topusko we can follow in a well-documented manner begins only after the arrival of colonel Ivan Nestor. Colonel Nestor started the development of Topusko, but the turning point was the arrival of the king Francis II in 1818, and the repeated donation of money for the construction. Therefore, Ivan Nestor is with good reason considered to be "the real father of Topusko".

The next stronger phase in the development followed the arrival of ban Josip Jelačić (later the count and the governor of Croatia). At that time also the capital objects are built and Topusko stands out from the common bathing resort and becomes a fashionable bathing-place.

In the late 19th and early 20th century, Topusko was a district capital in the Zagreb County of the Kingdom of Croatia-Slavonia.

During World War II, the town was occupied by Axis troops and was included into the Pavelić's Independent State of Croatia (NDH). The fascist Ustashe regime committed the Genocide of the Serbs and the Holocaust. The NDH forces killed in a cruel way more than 600 Serbs in Staro Selo Topusko, while and the largest massacre occurred between 28 July and 3 August 1941 when 250 villagers were executed. Topusko hosted 3rd session of ZAVNOH, the highest governing organ of the anti-fascist movement in Croatia, during which, on May 9, 1944, the Federal State of Croatia was formally founded.

During the Croatian War of Independence, Topusko was occupied by the unrecognized breakaway Republic of Serbian Krajina. It was returned to Croatian control during Operation Storm.

HQ Sector North UNPROFOR was located in Topusko in the period 1992 - 1995.

== Notable people ==
- Joseph Schlessinger - biochemist and biophysician

== See also ==
- Federal State of Croatia
- ZAVNOH
