= Monument to the uprising of the people of Kordun and Banija =

World War II monument in Croatia

- Spomenik ustanku naroda Banije i Korduna
- Croatia
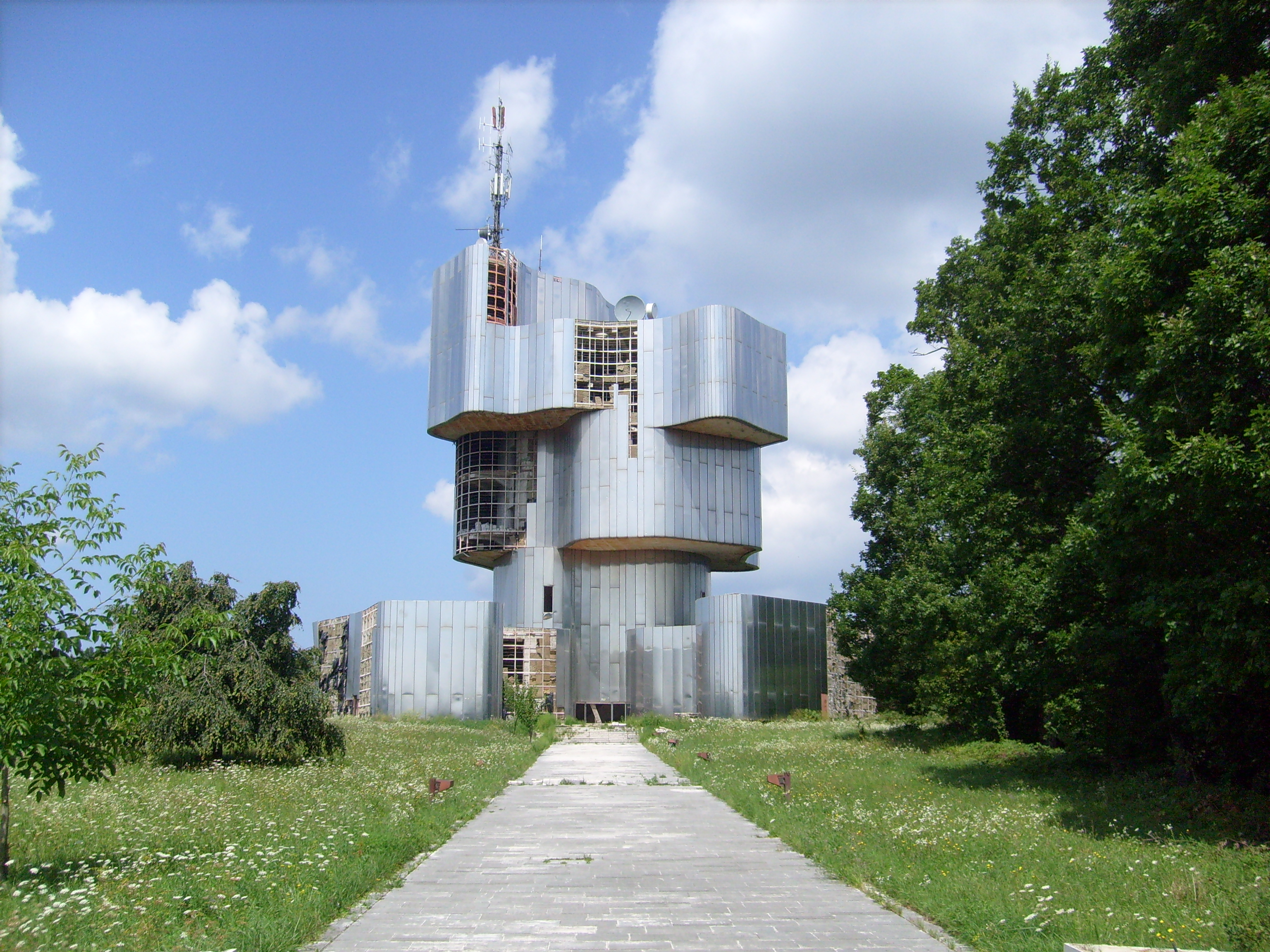
- The monument in 2010
- For the people of Kordun and Banija
- Unveiled: 4 October 1981
- Location: 45°18′58.9″N 15°48′17.6″E; Veliki Petrovac, Petrova Gora, Croatia near Malička, Topusko
- Designed by: Vojin Bakić

The monument to the uprising of the people of Kordun and Banija (Croatian: Spomenik ustanku naroda Banije i Korduna), also known simply as the Petrova Gora Monument, is a modernist Yugoslav World War II memorial on Veliki Petrovac, a hill in the Petrova Gora range of Croatia. Designed by sculptor Vojin Bakić, the monument commemorates the rebellion efforts of the communist Yugoslav Partisan rebels and Serbs from the Croatian regions of Kordun and Banija against the Ustaše regime during World War II, as well as the establishment of a Partisan hospital in Petrova Gora in 1941. It is a component of a larger monument complex, which included a public square and reception facilities such as restaurants, visitor centers, and shops.

A nationwide competition was held for the design of the monument in 1970, with Igor Toš's proposal being selected over Bakić's, whose design received criticism for failing to match the quality of his previous work. However, Bakić continued to refine his design, and a supplementary competition held in late 1974 resulted in the implementation of his proposal. Construction on the monument began on 15 September 1980; initially planned to be made of concrete, the structure was built using stainless steel metal sheets supported by a steel frame. The interior included a reading room, library, administrative offices, and an underground section for events. Additionally, the monument was planned to feature a museum spread across seven levels, showcasing historical documents and permanent exhibits. It was dedicated by Yugoslav politician Jure Bilić on 4 October 1981, the 40th anniversary of the uprising and the establishment of the hospital.

Following its dedication, the monument faced significant challenges. During the Croatian War of Independence in the 1990s, the monument was repurposed by the Yugoslav People's Army, leading to substantial interior damage and vandalism. Restoration attempts have been largely unsuccessful, leaving the monument with several of its steel panels missing and a decaying concrete structure. The monument is currently in an advanced state of disrepair.

== Background ==
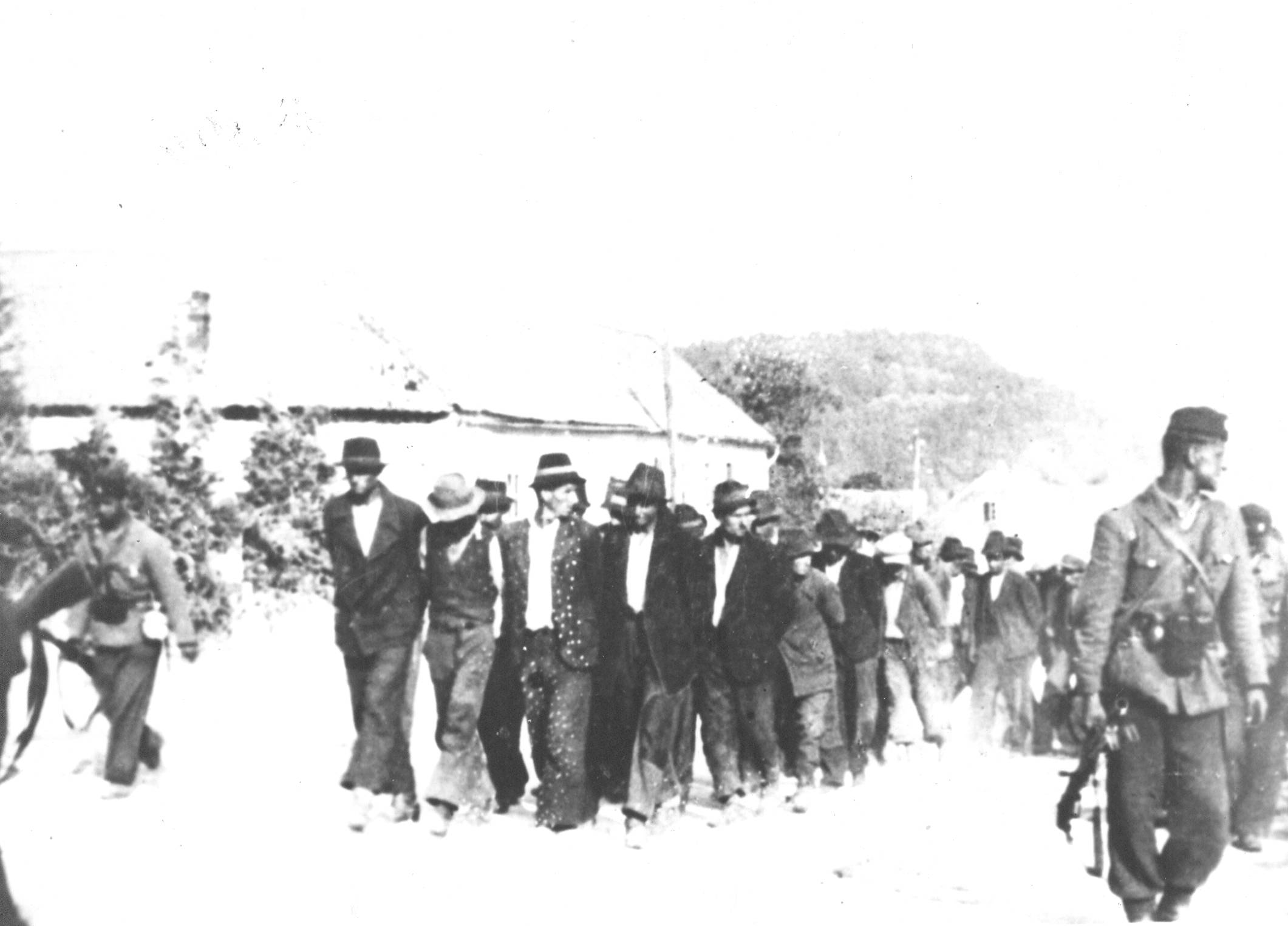
Serbs being led to their executions in Banija, 1942

During the occupation of Yugoslavia in World War II, the fascist Ustaše regime in the Independent State of Croatia orchestrated a genocide against ethnic Serbs. The first massacres began in early 1941 and targeted areas in central Croatia, including the regions of Kordun and Banija, which were chosen by the Ustaše for their large Serb populations. By mid-1941, the Serbs in these regions were planning resistance efforts, culminating in an armed uprising in the town of Banski Grabovac in Banija on 23 July, organized by Rade Končar and Josip Kraš of the Communist Party of Croatia. The attack on 23 July prompted harsh retaliation, which manifested in large-scale executions resulting in over 4,000 combined deaths across Banija. (Note: In Banski Grabovac, nearly the entire population of 1,100 Serb peasants was killed during the Banski Grabovac massacre. In Vlahović, the death toll comprised "upwards of 800 Serb civilians". In Glina, a total of 2,394 people were killed in the Glina massacres.) On the night of 29 July, a massacre at Ivanović Jarak killed 350 to 400 Serbs from villages in Kordun. Thousands of Serbs retreated in fear to the forests surrounding the mountain range of Petrova Gora in Kordun, seeking protection and weapons rumored to be stashed in the area. However, the arrival of communist Yugoslav Partisan resistance units stifled the worries of the people, and feelings of rebellion among them strengthened.

The killings at Ivanović Jarak had proven to be the impetus for the uprising in Kordun. Rebellion efforts were led by Partisan groups from both Kordun and Banija under Vasilj Gaćeša and Ivan Rukavina, and in early August, several encounters between the Partisans and the Ustaše occurred around the city of Slunj. By 8 or 9 August major ethnic cleansing operations had ceased in much of Croatia; however, murders continued under the direction of Ante Pavelić and Slavko Kvaternik, particularly in regions that had previously been the sites of rebellion, including Petrova Gora. (Note: Biondich states that "The 'cleansing operation' lasted until 8 August", while Goldstein reports that a decree ending the ethnic cleansing operations was issued on 9 August 1941.) Despite occasional victories by rebel groups, such as the liberation of Vojnić in January, by early 1942 civilian and rebel populations in Kordun and Banija had been ravaged, and in May, thousands of people in the villages around Petrova Gora were killed.

By 1943, the Ustaše had lost much of its influence, and on 8 May 1945, Partisan troops captured the Croatian capital of Zagreb, marking the symbolic end of World War II in Yugoslavia. The following year, Yugoslav president Ivan Ribar laid the foundation for a memorial on Petrova Gora, but the project was delayed due to funding issues and insurgent activity.

In the 1960s, the Administration for Memorial Objects of Petrova Gora (Croatian: Uprava za spomen-objekte Petrova gora, later renamed to Memorial Park Petrova Gora) was established for the purpose of institutional conservation and research efforts related to wartime activities in the area. In 1965, under the leadership of chief planner Ante Marinović-Uzelac and a team of multidisciplinary experts, the Institute of Urbanism at the Faculty of Architecture of the University of Zagreb began conceptualizing a memorial area. By 1969, Marinović-Uzelac, tourism expert Dragutin Alfier, and architect Bruno Milić had developed a general plan to create protected historical and natural sites for visits and recreation. The plan aimed to utilize the sites for tourism, to educate and preserve the region's historical significance; in addition to its role in World War II, the area was the site of the Battle of Gvozd Mountain in 1097, wars during the time of the Military Frontier, and the activities of the Green Cadres.

== Design and construction ==
=== Design competitions and selection ===
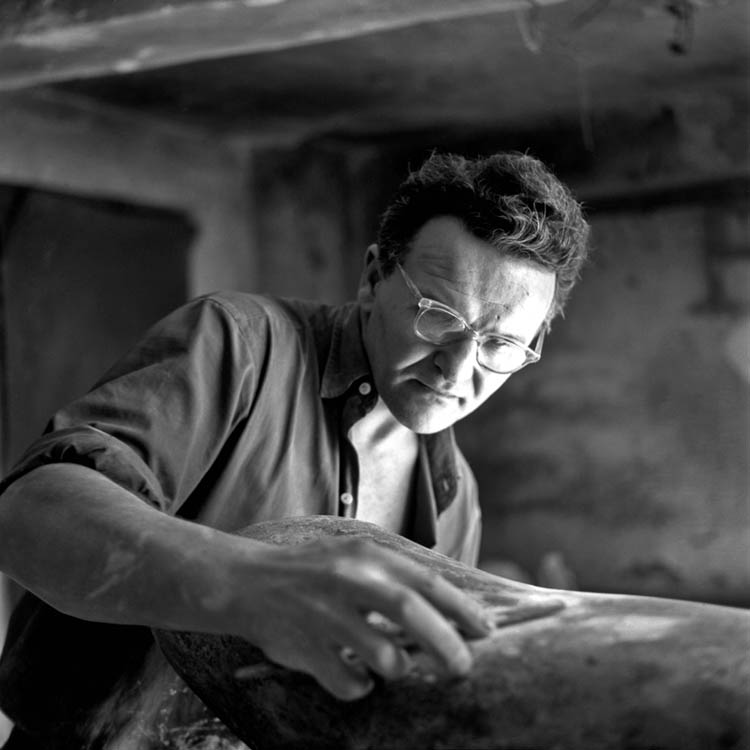
Sculptor Vojin Bakić in 1956

In 1970, a nationwide competition was launched in Yugoslavia to design the Petrova Gora memorial, organized by the Croatian associations of architects, visual artists, and urban planners. Veliki Petrovac, the highest summit of Petrova Gora, was chosen as the site for its strategic and scenic location, providing a setting where the building could blend with the surrounding beech forest and be visible from far distances. Participants were encouraged to create a structure that would not only honor historical battles and the liberation war but also function as a museum, assembly hall, tourist center, restaurant, and an observation point. The following year, the competition concluded with 17 submissions, each evaluated by a jury led by General Colonel Rade Bulat and composed of experts from various fields, including Vanja Radauš, Josip Seissel, and Savo Zlatić. The jury focused on selecting a design that balanced architectural, sculptural, and urbanistic elements, and considered each submission's relationship with the surrounding environment. The first-place award of 40,000 Yugoslav dinars was given to Igor Toš and Timur Cevegđav for their design, which consisted of two spiral-shaped shells symbolizing continuous struggle, unity, and aspiration. The second-place prize of 20,000 dinars was awarded to sculptor Vojin Bakić.

Toš's design was negatively received by Grgo Gamulin, who argued that it lacked an emotional and structural connection to Petrova Gora. He thought that the spiral architecture was not well-suited to the historical and environmental context of Petrova Gora, and suggested that the design would be more appropriate for an urban setting. Despite these criticisms, the jury valued Toš's approach and began preparations for its construction. On 17 March 1973, the Committee for the Construction of the Monument on Petrova Gora was established in Topusko, chaired by Vladimir Bakarić. The committee included members appointed by the communities of Vojnić, Vrginmost, Slunj, and Velika Kladuša. An executive committee was elected with Bulat as president, responsible for overseeing the monument's construction. Between 1973 and 1974, Toš invited the project's investor to prepare for the construction project, seeking to identify issues related to the implementation of the selected design. He collaborated with members of the executive committee to define an expanded project program, which was subsequently accepted by the committee. However, new demands from the executive committee brought challenges; for instance, the monument's construction prevented the removal of an existing structure atop Veliki Petrovac, and the need for a scenic area also necessitated adjustments to the original solution. To address these requirements, an expanded meeting of the executive committee was held on 31 October 1974, which decided to conduct another competition to create a new design. This competition involved the winners of the first three awarded works from the 1970 general competition: Toš, Bakić, Luketić, and Vitić. All of those invited except for Toš submitted their documentation by 8 November 1974. The competition concluded on 4 March 1975, with a jury selecting Bakić's proposal. (Note: Zatezalo cited the year of selection as 1974.)

Bakić's submission in the supplementary competition was very different from his entry in the first. His original proposal, which consisted of a dual-component sculpture featuring an external concrete shell that enclosed a stainless steel sphere with a museum and observatory, was recognized for its concept but criticized for not matching the quality of his previous works. By 1974, Bakić had refined his concept, focusing on making the monument smaller while retaining a form that emphasized its height. His intention was for the structure to symbolize the fluid movement of flags, to create a composition that was both dynamic and dramatic. However, he struggled to integrate functional aspects; a viewpoint was planned at the top required Bakić to accommodate a shaft for two elevators and a staircase inside, along with other installations. To address these needs, Bakić designed a cylinder that provided space for floors and essential functions, while also ensuring that the external structure complemented the internal elements. Berislav Šerbetić and Tomislav Odak helped resolve these challenges. The final design featured a social space on the ground floor, from which the monument branched into two sections. All other social spaces were located underground, including a hall for gatherings with a foyer, galleries for ethnographic collections, and facilities for stage performances. The museum was positioned in the upper part of the structure; it would span six levels, with its galleries acting as multipurpose spaces.

The monument was officially intended to commemorate the Serb and Partisan rebels of Kordun and Banija, as well as a hospital that had been built on Petrova Gora by Partisan groups in October 1941. However Bakić, who was a Croatian Serb from Bjelovar, dedicated the monument to his four brothers, who were killed by the Ustaše in the Jadovno concentration camp in 1941. The monument's design has been commonly cited as an example of Yugoslav modernist architecture.

=== Construction and dedication ===
In 1979, the Executive Committee assigned the project to the Tempo construction company from Zagreb, and in April 1980 construction of the facilities around the monument began. The facilities were built so that they would not interfere with the monument's visual dominance; the landscape architecture was designed to complement the monument without detracting from its appearance, and the reception spaces, which included restaurants, visitor centers, shops, and restrooms, were built away from the site to preserve the structure's prominence. The public square, situated near the bus stop, was constructed lower than the monument for similar reasons. Reception buildings were designed as two slabs covered with earth and greenery, featuring a shell made of glass, and were decorated with oak furniture and stone, with an information counter, ticket sales, and souvenirs, enclosed by seating areas offering views of the surrounding nature. A path from the reception area to the monument was made of stone blocks and ascended over 150 meters (490 ft), with a midway stop at a tomb marked by a thick granite slab. Low lighting was used to ensure everything remained visually subordinate to the monument, while horticultural elements were designed to highlight the existing forest.

The construction of the monument began on 15 September 1980. Initially planned to be made of concrete, the monument was made from stainless steel metal sheets supported by a steel frame, a choice that adhered to the aesthetic of Bakić's previous monument works. The stainless steel's reflective surface would serve to lessen the visual impact of the monument, mirroring the surrounding forest and capturing changes in the environment. The monument contained two chambers, which included fire escape staircases, elevators, and storage facilities. Its interior was planned to house a reading room, library, and administrative offices for Memorial Park Petrova Gora, with the names of 34,392 fallen fighters and civilian victims of the war inscribed on the inner walls. The museum within the monument was built with seven levels and covered 718 square meters (7,730 sq ft), where historical documents and permanent displays would be exhibited. An underground section was constructed to host film screenings, conferences, and other events, covering 1,330 square meters (14,300 sq ft) and reaching nine meters (30 ft) below ground, with foundations placed an additional three meters (9.8 ft) deeper. On the top of the monument, an observation deck from where visitors of the complex could view the landscapes of Petrova Gora. Upon completion, the monument occupied an area of 25,000 square meters (270,000 sq ft), and stood 37 meters (121 ft) tall. The project's construction costs alone totaled 34 billion dinars, with the stainless steel paneling, which had been imported from Sweden, costing an additional 31 billion dinars.

The entire Petrova Gora is actually a large tomb. Within its bosom, there are around 1,700 partisan graves and 2,500 graves of victims of fascist terror. Every meadow, every tree, and every stream is bathed in the blood of people who belonged to an exhausted, I would not say unhappy, but fearless generation.

— Jure Bilić, speech at the dedication of the Petrova Gora memorial, 1981

The memorial complex was officially dedicated by Yugoslav politician Jure Bilić on 4 October 1981, marking the 40th anniversary of the uprising and the establishment of the first Partisan hospital at Petrova Gora, and the first anniversary of Josip Broz Tito's visit to Petrova Gora. The dedication was attended by 3,500 people and featured a speech from Bilić, praising the fearlessness of the Partisan fighters and the victims of the Ustaše regime. An exhibition titled "Tito in the Karlovac-Kordun Region" was inaugurated within the monument, although the rest of the space designated for the museum, lectures, and similar activities remained underdeveloped.

== Post-dedication ==
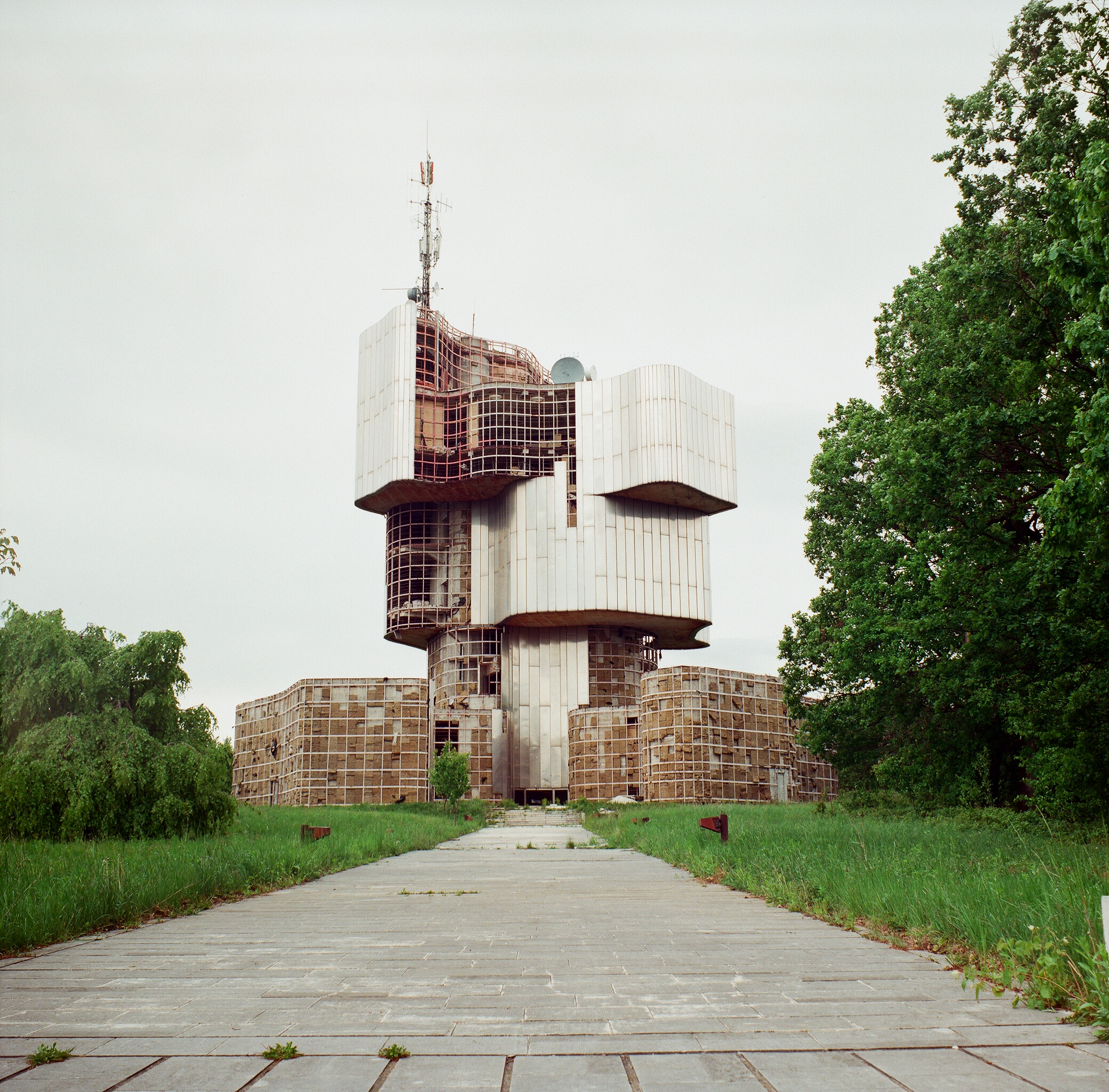
The monument in 2012. Stainless steel panels are visibly missing from the exterior; many stolen since the Croatian War of Independence in 1991.

The monument became a popular site for school trips and other visitors, largely due to its observation deck. However, after the Croatian War of Independence began in 1991, the monument, which was located in an occupied part of the country, was repurposed for military use along with the surrounding park by the Yugoslav People's Army (JNA). The interior was converted into a base that housed a signal corps, a military police company, and an air defense platoon; a training center; and a storage facility for ammunition, weapons, and explosives. A makeshift hospital was situated 100 meters (330 ft) away from the monument, equipped with around 50 hospital beds and an operating room. The selection of Petrova Gora for a wartime hospital was influenced by its historical significance as the site of the Partisan hospital during World War II.

The monument's occupation by the JNA led to significant internal damage. Its contents were vandalized and looted by soldiers and civilians. In 1994, Mile Dakić, the former director of the memorial park, reported to the government of the Republic of Serbian Krajina that since 1992, the destruction of buildings, inventory, books, museum exhibits, and archival materials had persisted, leaving the entire complex in a state of decay. Following Operation Storm in 1995, the complex continued to suffer from neglect and vandalism.

=== Restoration attempts ===
In September 2012, the group What, How and for Whom? (WHW) began an initiative to address the future of the monument, exploring possible attempts at its restoration and potential social functions. The structure had previously been the focus of WHW's "Yesterday, Tomorrow" project in 2009, conducted in collaboration with the Serb National Council and Bakić's granddaughter, architect Ana Bakić. An open call for proposals for the restoration of the complex was issued; those who responded included choreographer Selma Banich and artist Marijan Crtalić. On 13 October 2012, a program was held at the monument, including a tour, a collaborative exhibition setup of the submitted works, and a discussion about the monument's role as a public space. The discussion included local government representatives, authors of the proposals, members of the Alliance of Anti-Fascist Fighters and Anti-Fascists of the Republic of Croatia, and other interested participants.

Attempts at renovating the monument have gone unfulfilled. Although the restoration of the Petrova Gora complex and the Partisan hospital was included in a coalition agreement between the Croatian Democratic Union and Independent Democratic Serb Party in 2009, only the roofs and part of the interior of the Partisan hospital were refurbished. The state-owned company Odašiljači i veze expressed interest in working on the monument; however, their interest was purely functional, with the company only opting to install a large repeater on the monument's roof and sealing off two rooms with high voltage warning signs on the doors. The monument remains in an advanced state of disrepair, with multiple steel panels missing and its concrete structure decaying.

The monument to the uprising of the people of Kordun and Banija in 2020

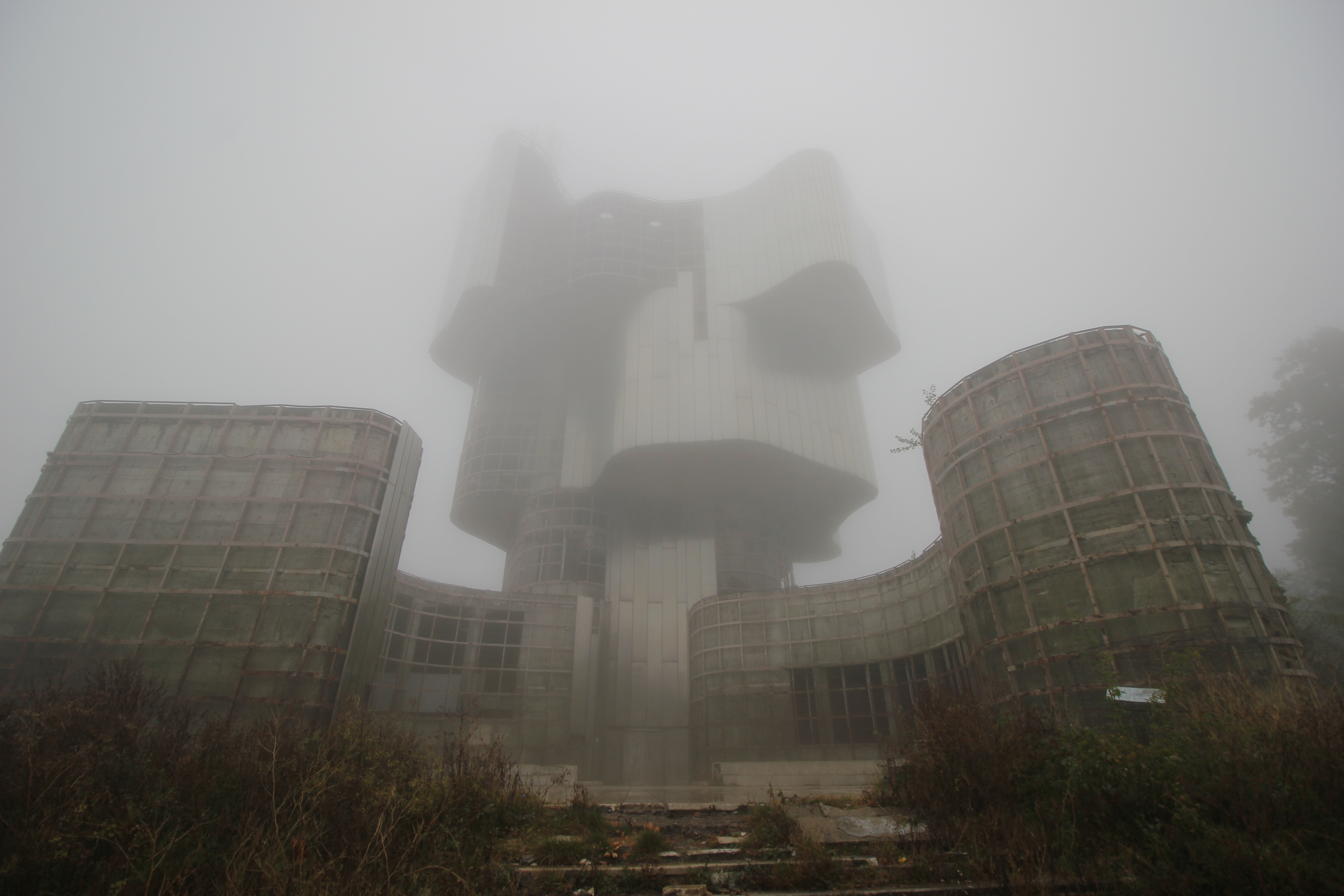
Exterior of the monument

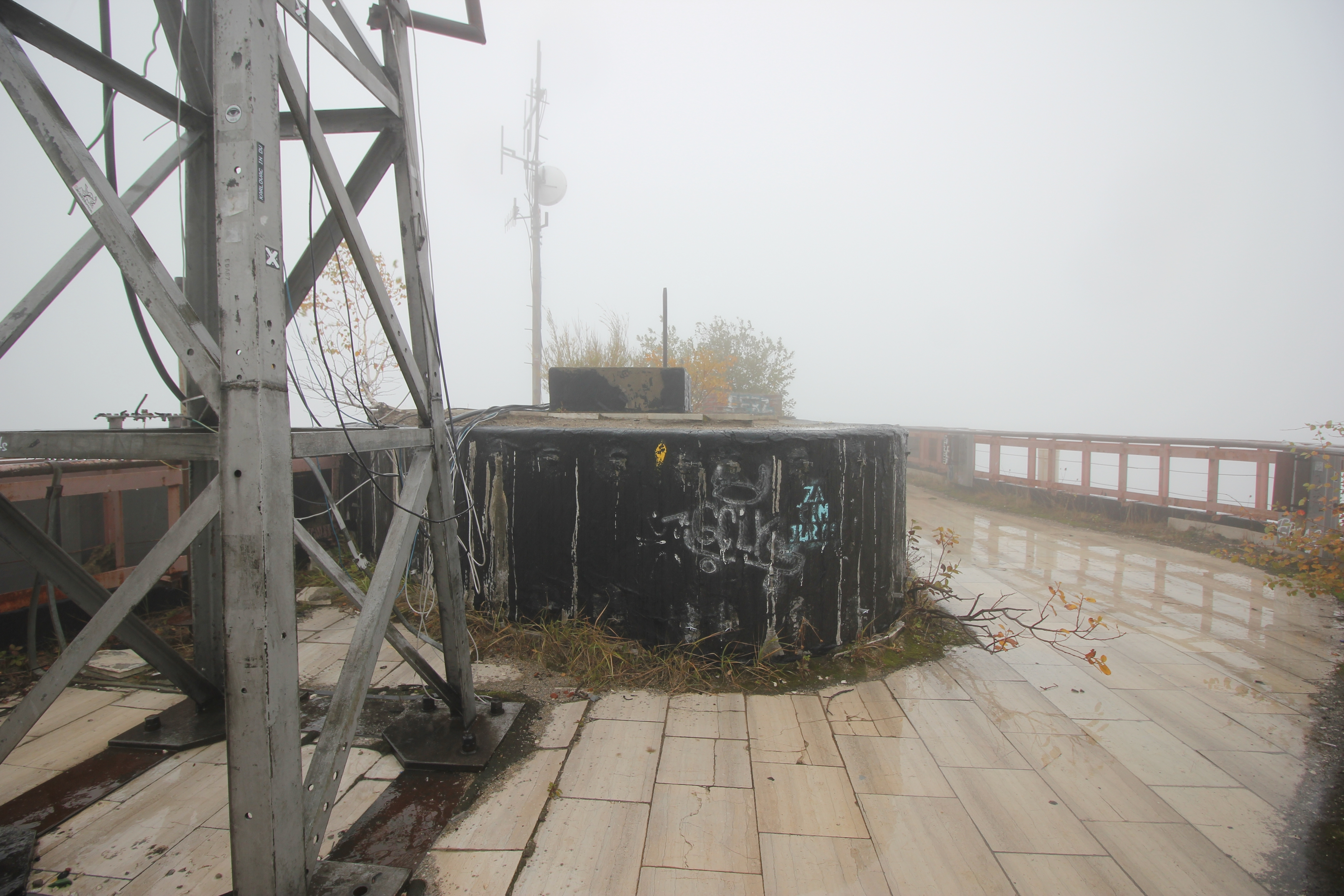
Observation deck with graffiti

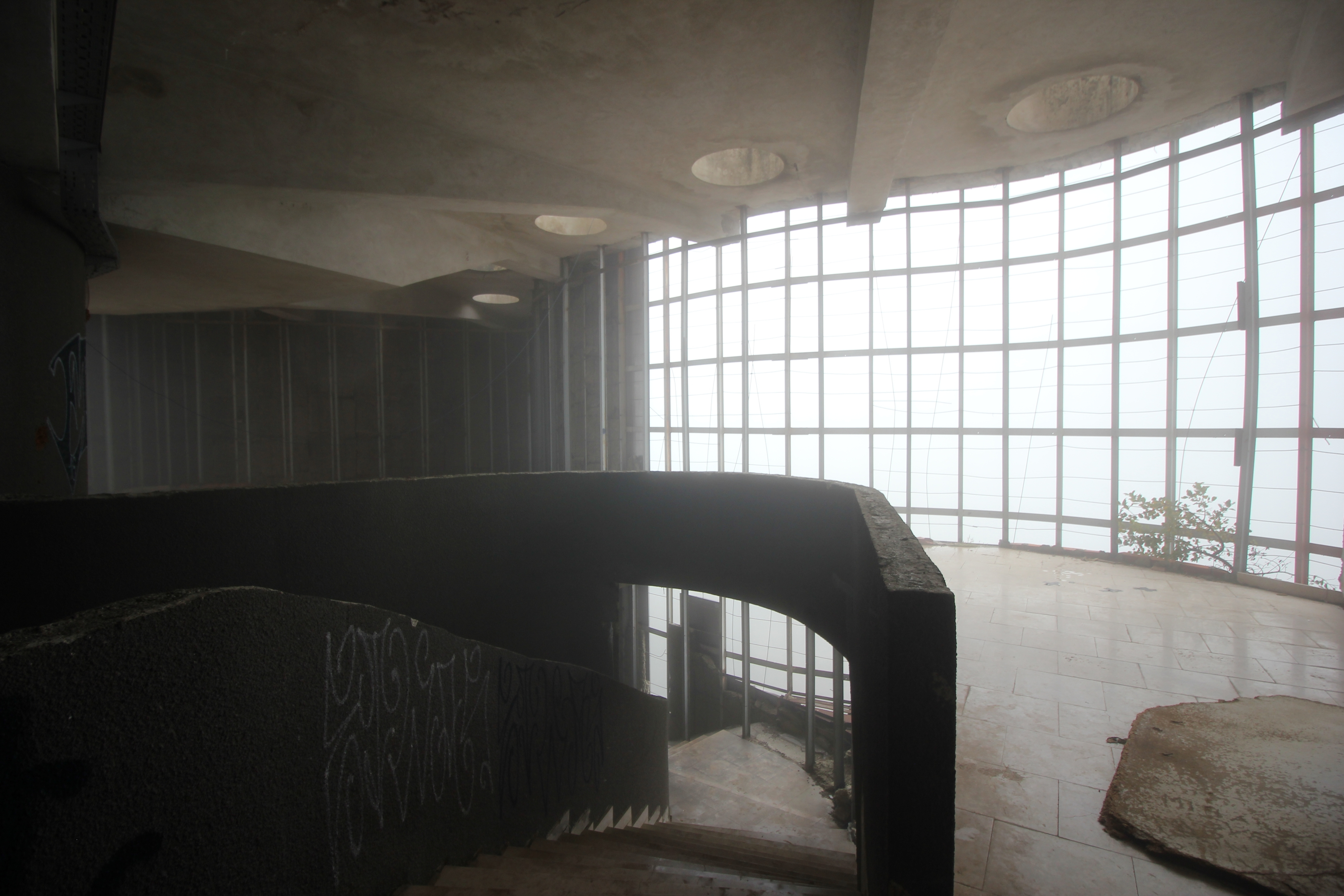
Exposed interior with missing panels

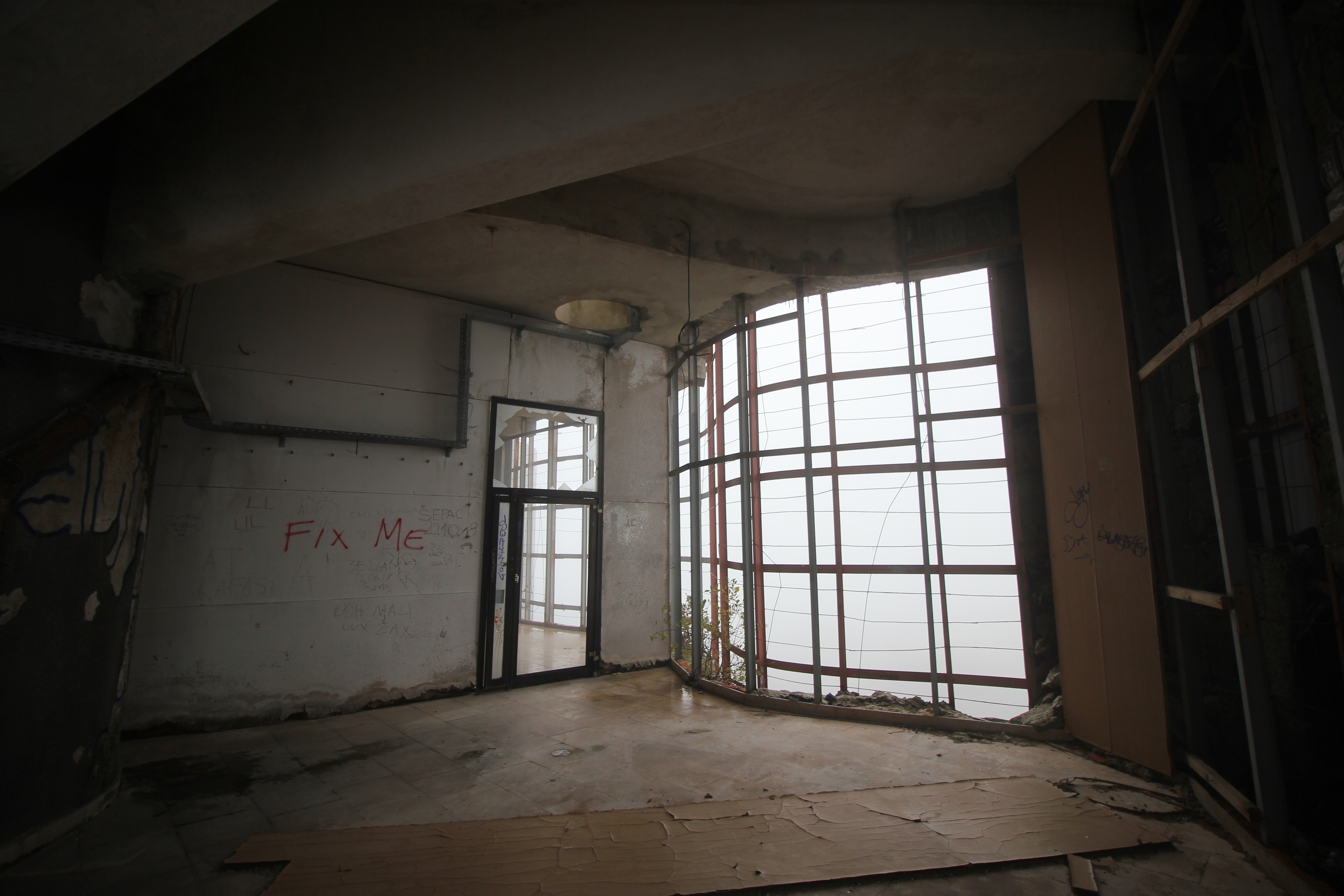
Exposed room with graffiti reading "FIX ME"

== Depictions ==
The monument was featured in Croatian artist David Maljković's video series Scene for a New Heritage (2004-2006), and in a Museum of Modern Art photo exhibition titled Toward a Concrete Utopia from 2018 to 2019. In August 2019, it was reported that the monument would be used as a filming location for the 2021 German Netflix production Tribes of Europa and was set to be under lease until the following year; Bakić's granddaughters expressed disappointment about having not been informed of the decision to film at the site. A photo of the monument is featured on the cover of Unknown Mortal Orchestra's 2011 debut self-titled album.

== See also ==
- List of World War II monuments and memorials in Croatia
