= Glina massacres =

Ustaše war crime during World War II

- Part of Genocide of Serbs in the Independent State of Croatia
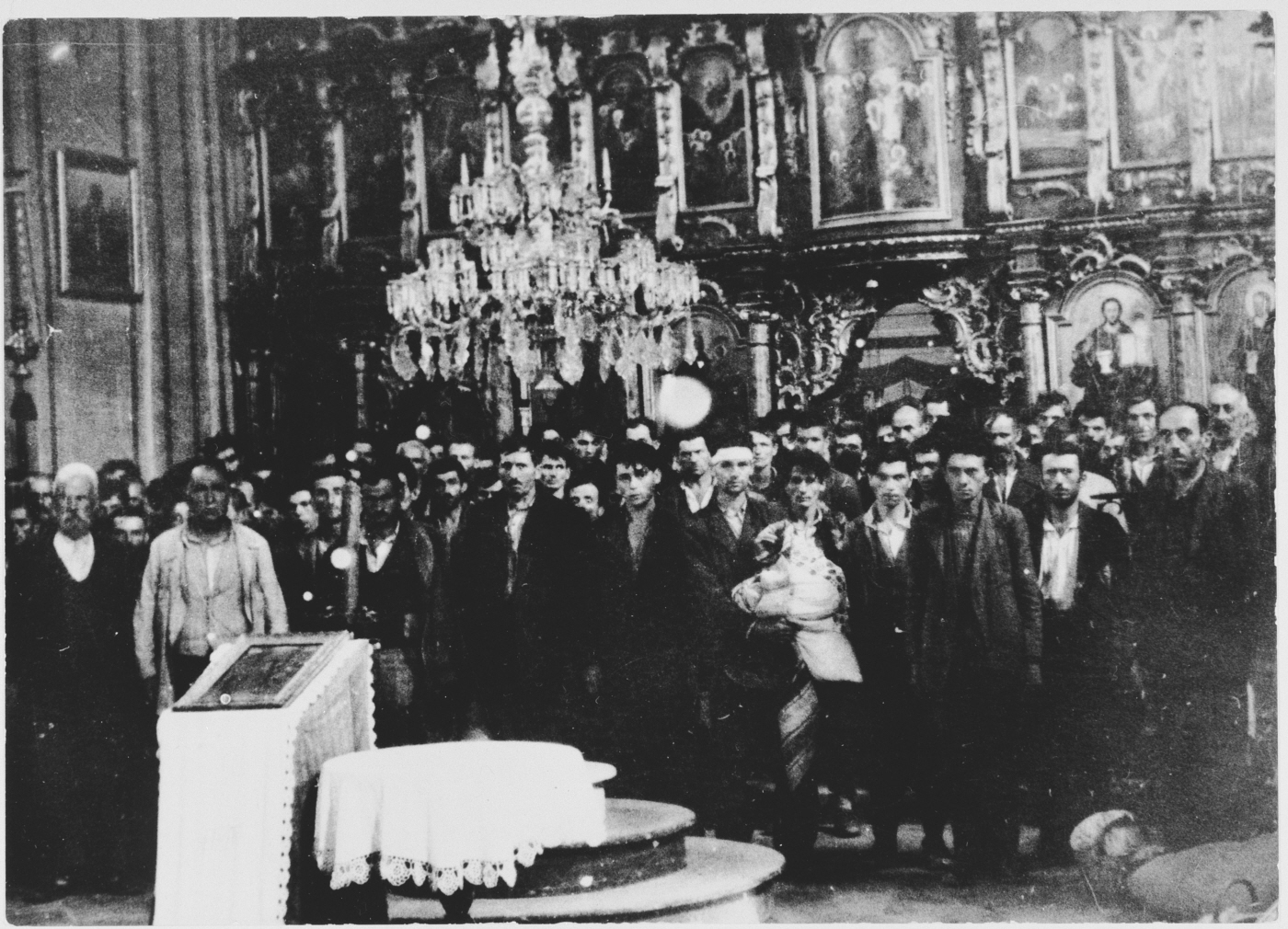
- A photograph from the files of Zagreb police chief Božidar Cerovski showing Serbs from Glina gathered in a Serbian Orthodox church prior to the second Glina massacre, 30 July 1941.

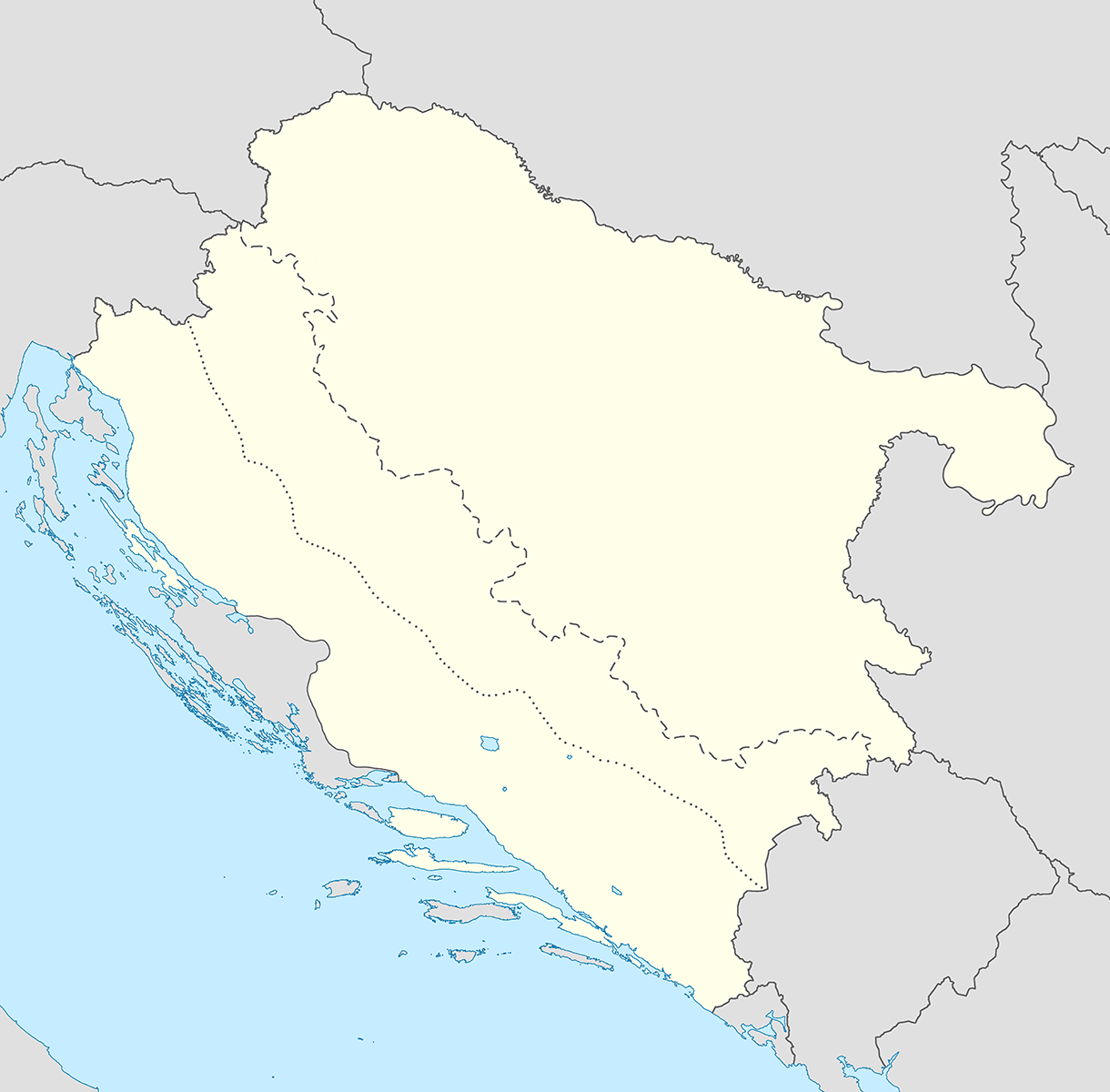
- Glina (NDH) A map of the Independent State of Croatia showing the location of Glina
- Location: 45°20′22″N 16°05′29″E; Glina, Gora County, Independent State of Croatia
- Date: May–August 1941
- Target: Serbs
- Attack type: Mass killing, ethnic cleansing
- Deaths: 2,000–2,400
- Perpetrator: Ustaše
- Motive: Anti-Serbian Orthodoxy, anti-Serbian sentiment, Greater Croatia, anti-Yugoslavism, Catholic fanaticism, Croatisation

The Glina massacres were killings of Serb peasants in the town of Glina in the Independent State of Croatia (NDH) that occurred between May and August 1941, during World War II. The first wave of massacres in the town began on 11 or 12 May 1941, when a band of Ustaše led by Mirko Puk murdered a group of Serb men and boys in a Serbian Orthodox church before setting it on fire. The following day, approximately 100 Serb males were murdered by the Ustaše in the nearby village of Prekopi. Estimates of the overall number of Serbs killed from 11 to 13 May range from 260 to 417. Further killings in Glina occurred between 30 July and 3 August of that same year, when 700–2,000 Serbs were massacred by a group of Ustaše led by Vjekoslav Luburić.

In many of these massacres, the prospect of conversion was used as a means to gather Serbs together so that they could be killed. Ljubo Jednak, the only survivor of these killings, went on to testify at the trials of the several prominent figures in the NDH after the war. Puk was captured by British forces in 1945 while attempting to flee to Austria and was extradited to Yugoslavia the following year, where he committed suicide. Luburić escaped Yugoslavia after the war and moved to Francoist Spain, where he was killed by a person generally assumed to be an agent of the Yugoslav State Security Service.

An estimated 2,000–2,400 people were killed in the Glina massacres. In 1969, a monument was erected and a memorial museum was built to commemorate the victims of the killings. Following the independence of Croatia from Yugoslavia, the monument was removed by Croatian authorities in the town. After the Croatian War of Independence, the local authorities failed to restore it and dismantled it instead.

== Background ==
On 6 April 1941, Axis forces invaded Yugoslavia. Poorly equipped and poorly trained, the Royal Yugoslav Army was quickly defeated. The country was then dismembered and the extreme Croat nationalist and fascist Ante Pavelić, who had been in exile in Benito Mussolini's Italy, was appointed Poglavnik (leader) of an Ustaše-led Croatian state – the Independent State of Croatia (often called the NDH, from the Croatian: Nezavisna Država Hrvatska). The NDH combined almost all of modern-day Croatia, all of modern-day Bosnia and Herzegovina and parts of modern-day Serbia into an "Italian-German quasi-protectorate". NDH authorities, led by the Ustaše militia, subsequently implemented genocidal policies against the Serb, Jewish and Romani population living within the borders of the new state. Ethnic Serbs were persecuted the most because Pavelić and the Ustaše considered them "potential turncoats" in what they wanted to be an ethnically pure state composed solely of Croats. Racist and antisemitic laws were passed, and ethnic Serbs, representing about thirty percent of the NDH's population of 6.3 million, became targets of large-scale massacres perpetrated by the Ustaše. By the middle of 1941, these killings reached degrees of brutality that shocked even some Germans. The Cyrillic script was subsequently banned by Croatian authorities, Orthodox Christian church schools were closed, and Serbs were ordered to wear identifying armbands. Mile Budak, the Croatian Minister of Education, is reported to have said that one-third of Serbs in the NDH were to be killed, one-third were to be expelled, and one-third were to be converted to Roman Catholicism. The Ustaše then established numerous concentration camps where thousands of Serbs were mistreated, starved, and murdered.

Glina is a small market town in the Banovina region of Croatia located about 55 kilometers (34 miles) south of Zagreb. In 1931, the town itself had a population of 2,315 people and was inhabited mostly by Serbs, Croats, and Jews. Shortly after the Ustaše took power, the Croatian Minister of Justice, Mirko Puk, established a base in the town.

== Massacres ==
=== May 1941 ===
The idea for the May 1941 massacre came from Mirko Puk, who was the Minister of Justice for the NDH. On 10 May local Ustaše leadership met in Glina where they drew up a list of names of all the Serbs between sixteen and sixty years of age to be arrested. After much discussion, they decided that all of the arrested should be killed. On the night of 11 May, mass arrests of male Serbs over the age of sixteen began, regardless of occupation or class. Most of the arrested Serbs voluntarily left with the Ustaše as they were told they would be taken in for questioning and subsequently released. In historiography, two different versions of the massacre are described.

Some sources state that the Ustaše then herded the group into an Orthodox Church and demanded that they be given documents proving the Serbs had all converted to Catholicism. Two Serbs produced the required documents and were released. The Ustaše then locked inside and massacred those who did not possess conversion certificates, including priest Bogdan Opačić. The bodies were then left to burn as the Ustaše set the church on fire and waited outside to shoot any survivors attempting to escape the flames.

Other sources provide a different account of the massacre and write that the men were first imprisoned in a small holding area of a former gendarmerie building. Afterwards, on the night of 12 May, they were tied up in pairs, loaded into trucks and taken to a large pit where they were killed, primarily with guns. Historian Rory Yeomans writes that they were executed with knives, meat cleavers, mallets, hammers and scythes. The lone survivor of this first massacre was Nikica Samardžija, who managed to escape. He would later testify to the war crimes tribunal in Glina. The crime was a precursor to an even crueler one that would occur three months later in the Glina Orthodox Church, where according to Slavko Goldstein 100 Serbs were killed. On 13 May, further 100 Serb males were executed by the Ustaše in the nearby village of Prekopa.

Estimates of the number of Serbs killed on 11–13 May vary. Historians Jozo Tomasevich and Ivo Goldstein put the number at 260. Historians Sabrina P. Ramet and Marko Attila Hoare estimate that about 300 Serbs were massacred while historian Davide Rodogno puts the number at 417 killed. Of the 450 to 500 men living in Glina in April 1941, Slavko Goldstein estimates that most of them were killed on the night of 12 May, while some 100 survived due to various circumstances and that "less than four hundred, but certainly higher than three hundred" were killed in total. On 14 May, the Archbishop of Zagreb, Aloysius Stepinac, sent a letter of protest to Pavelić after receiving news of the killings. He failed to condemn the atrocity publicly. The next day, Pavelić visited Rome and was granted a private audience with Pope Pius XII, who offered de facto recognition of the NDH on behalf of the Holy See. Although he was aware that Pavelić was a totalitarian dictator, there is no evidence that he had knowledge of the first Glina massacre at the time.

=== July–August 1941 ===
On the night of 30 July 1941, a massacre similar to the one in May again occurred in Glina. That summer, the Ustaše had offered amnesty for all Serbs in the NDH who would convert from Eastern Orthodoxy to Roman Catholicism. Many Serbs responded positively, and one group turned up at a Serbian Orthodox church in Glina where a conversion ceremony was to take place. The Serbs who had gathered, thinking they were to undergo a conversion ceremony, were greeted by six members of the Ustaše under the direct command of Vjekoslav Luburić. When all were inside, the doors to the church were sealed. The Serbs were then forced to lie on the ground as the six Ustaše struck them one by one on the head with spiked clubs. More Ustaše then appeared and the killings continued. Victims were killed by having their throats cut or by having their heads smashed in with rifle butts. Only one of the victims, Ljubo Jednak, survived after playing dead and later described what had happened:

They started with one huge husky peasant who began singing an old historical heroic song of the Serbs. They put his head on the table and as he continued to sing they slit his throat and then the next squad moved in to smash his skull. I was paralyzed. "This is what you are getting," an Ustaša screamed. Ustaše surrounded us. There was absolutely no escape. Then the slaughter began. One group stabbed with knives, the other followed, smashing heads to make certain everyone was dead. Within a matter of minutes we stood in a lake of blood. Screams and wails, bodies dropping right and left.

The bodies were then put into trucks and were taken to a large burial pit, where they were left unattended long enough for Jednak to escape. It is estimated that 200 Serbs were killed that evening. Killings continued on 3 August, when the Ustaše murdered the inhabitants of Serb villages in the vicinity of the church. About one month later, the church was burned down by the Ustaše. Estimates of the number of Serbs killed from 30 July to 3 August vary widely. Sociologist Damir Mirković and historian Paul Mojzes state that 700 Serbs were killed. Journalist Tim Judah puts the number at 1,200, and historian Iván T. Berend writes that the Ustaše killed 1,800 people. Hoare writes that as many as 2,000 Serbs were murdered. Historian Filip Škiljan notes that while many Serbs were killed in this massacre, the total number of killed, as well as its location and the manner in which it was done has not been fully established.

== Aftermath ==
Following the massacres, many Serbs from Glina and its surroundings fled to Serbia or were deported to Ustaše-controlled concentration camps. The NDH collapsed in May 1945, and the following year the Nuremberg trials judged that the persecution experienced by Serbs in the country was a crime of genocide. Local Serbs returned to Glina after the war, partly out of a desire to remain near the graves of their deceased family members, and lived peacefully alongside their Croat neighbours until the outbreak of the Yugoslav Wars in the 1990s.

Puk, the organizer of the first massacre, was captured by British forces while attempting to flee to Austria in May 1945 and was extradited to Yugoslavia several months later, where he committed suicide by slitting his wrists with a razor blade. Luburić, the organizer of the second massacre, escaped Yugoslavia after the war and moved to Spain, where he was assassinated by a person generally assumed to have been an agent of the Yugoslav State Security Service (UDBA). Pavelić survived the war and died in Spain in 1959. Stepinac, who failed to publicly condemn the atrocities in Glina, was accused of collaborating with the Ustaše by Yugoslavia's new Communist government and was tried in 1946, where Jednak testified against him. He was subsequently sentenced to sixteen years imprisonment and died while under house arrest in 1960. In 1986, Jednak testified against the Ustaše government's Minister of the Interior, Andrija Artuković, at his trial in Croatia.

=== Legacy ===
From an estimated 300,000 Croatian Serbs that were murdered by the Ustaše from 1941 to 1945, more than 18,000 were from Glina at its surroundings. According to historians Hannes Grandits and Christian Promitzer, the massacres that occurred in the town in 1941 took the lives of approximately 2,000 Serbs. Professor Mark Levene estimates that 2,400 people died over the course of five mass killings that occurred in Glina during 1941. Sometimes called pogroms, the killings have been described by Judah as being one of the most infamous of the early atrocities perpetrated by the Ustaše. Professor Manus I. Midlarsky has noted that the burning of victims inside a church during the May killings "foreshadowed the later German massing of Jews inside their wooden synagogues in Poland ... [and] setting fire to the buildings as the congregants inside burned alive."

The poem Requiem (Serbian: Rekvijem, Реквијем) by poet Ivan V. Lalić is dedicated to the victims of the massacres in Glina. After the war, Yugoslav authorities removed the physical remnants where the church which had been burned down on 30 July had stood. In 1969, a monument by Antun Augustinčić and a museum (Croatian: Spomen-dom, lit. "Memorial home") were erected on the site and were dedicated to the victims of the massacres.

Following the independence of Croatia from Yugoslavia, the monument, a marble tablet bearing the names of Serbs killed in the massacres, was removed by Croatian authorities in the town. The memorial museum was heavily damaged in 1991, during the Croatian War of Independence. In August 1995, the Augustinčić monument was damaged and removed again after it had been restored by Croatian Serb authorities following its initial removal in 1991. Croatian authorities began working on the conversion of the museum into a general-purpose cultural institution named the "Croatian Home" (Croatian: Hrvatski dom). The move was met with indignation by the Serbian community, who complained to the local authorities, to the Ministry of Culture, and to the Prime Minister of Croatia. They were publicly supported by writer Slavko Goldstein, but local Croatian Peasant Party politicians rejected their pleas.

The annual commemorative event for the victims of the July–August 1941 massacres is held in the last week of July. The commemoration, which is jointly organised by the Serb National Council and the Antifascist League of Croatia, takes place both in front of the Memorial Home and at the Orthodox cemetery.
