= Savska Ves =

- Village
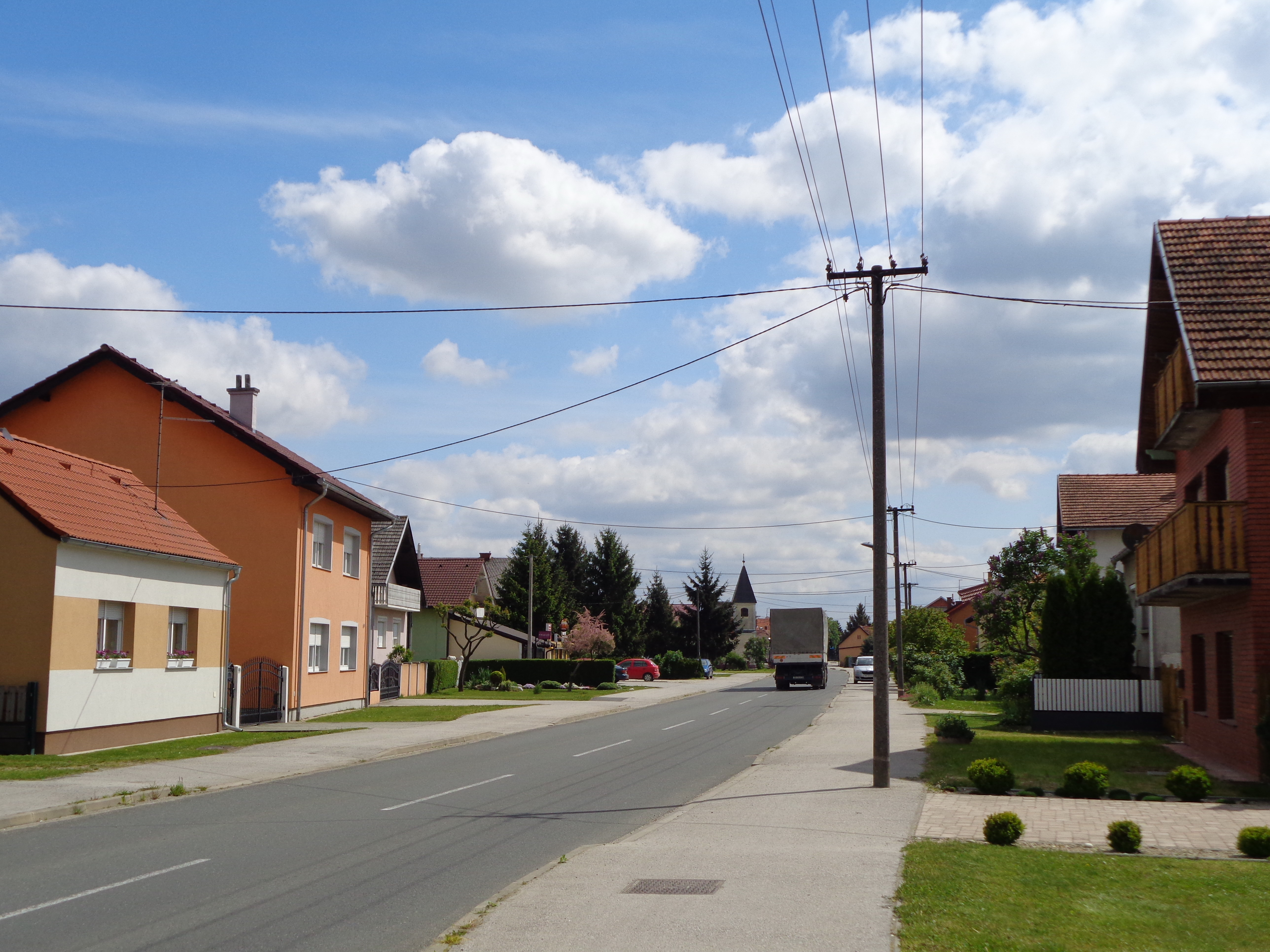
- Savska Ves, Josip Bajkovec Street

- Location within Croatia
- Coordinates: 46°22′16″N 16°25′30″E
- Country: Croatia
- County: Međimurje County
- Municipality: Čakovec

Area
  - Total: 2.9 km^{2} (1.1 sq mi)

Population (2021)
  - Total: 1,165
  - Density: 400/km^{2} (1,000/sq mi)
- Time zone: UTC+1 (CET)
  - Summer (DST): UTC+2 (CEST)
- Postal code: 40000 Čakovec
- Area code: 040

Savska Ves (Hungarian: Százkő) is a village in Međimurje County, Croatia.

The village is part of the wider area of Čakovec, the county seat of Međimurje County. It is located next to the southern limits of the city, around 2 kilometres from its centre. It is also connected with the village of Strahoninec, which is a separate municipality. There are two streets in Savska Ves, one of them formed by the road that connects Čakovec with Totovec. The population of the village in the 2011 census was 1,217.

== History ==
It is not certain when the village was established. However, it was most likely the village listed as Zawszkawecz on the list of settlements in the Čakovec area in 1478.

In the 1857 census, the population of Savska Ves was 219. By the beginning of the 20th century, it grew to over 400. The village was already predominantly populated by Croats at the time. In the 1910 census, it had a population of 446. It was part of the Čakovec district (Hungarian: Csáktornyai járás) of Zala County in the Kingdom of Hungary.

In 1920, when the Treaty of Trianon was signed, the village became part of the Kingdom of Yugoslavia. In the 1921 census, it had a population of 493, which grew to 598 in the next census 10 years later. Between 1941 and 1945, it belonged to Hungary again, as the entire Međimurje region was annexed by the Hungarians at the time.

After World War II, the village became part of Croatia within the Federal People's Republic of Yugoslavia. It had a population of 709 in the 1948 census. The population grew to over 1,000 by the 1980s. Following the independence of Croatia in 1991, a portion of the village was annexed to Strahoninec. Curiously, the population of Savska Ves in the 1991 and 2001 censuses was exactly the same – 1,238.
