= Čakovec =

- City
- Grad Čakovec; City of Čakovec
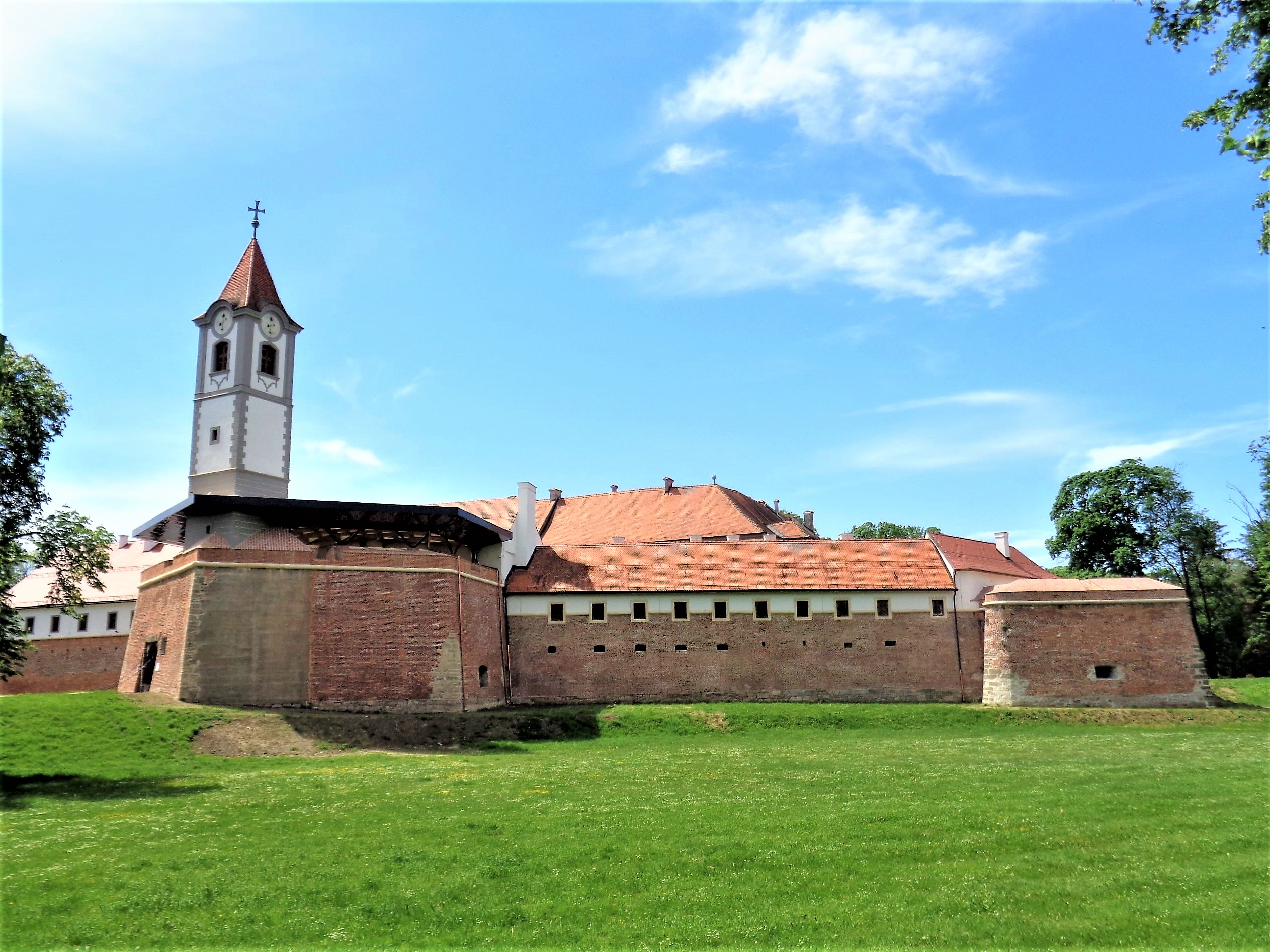
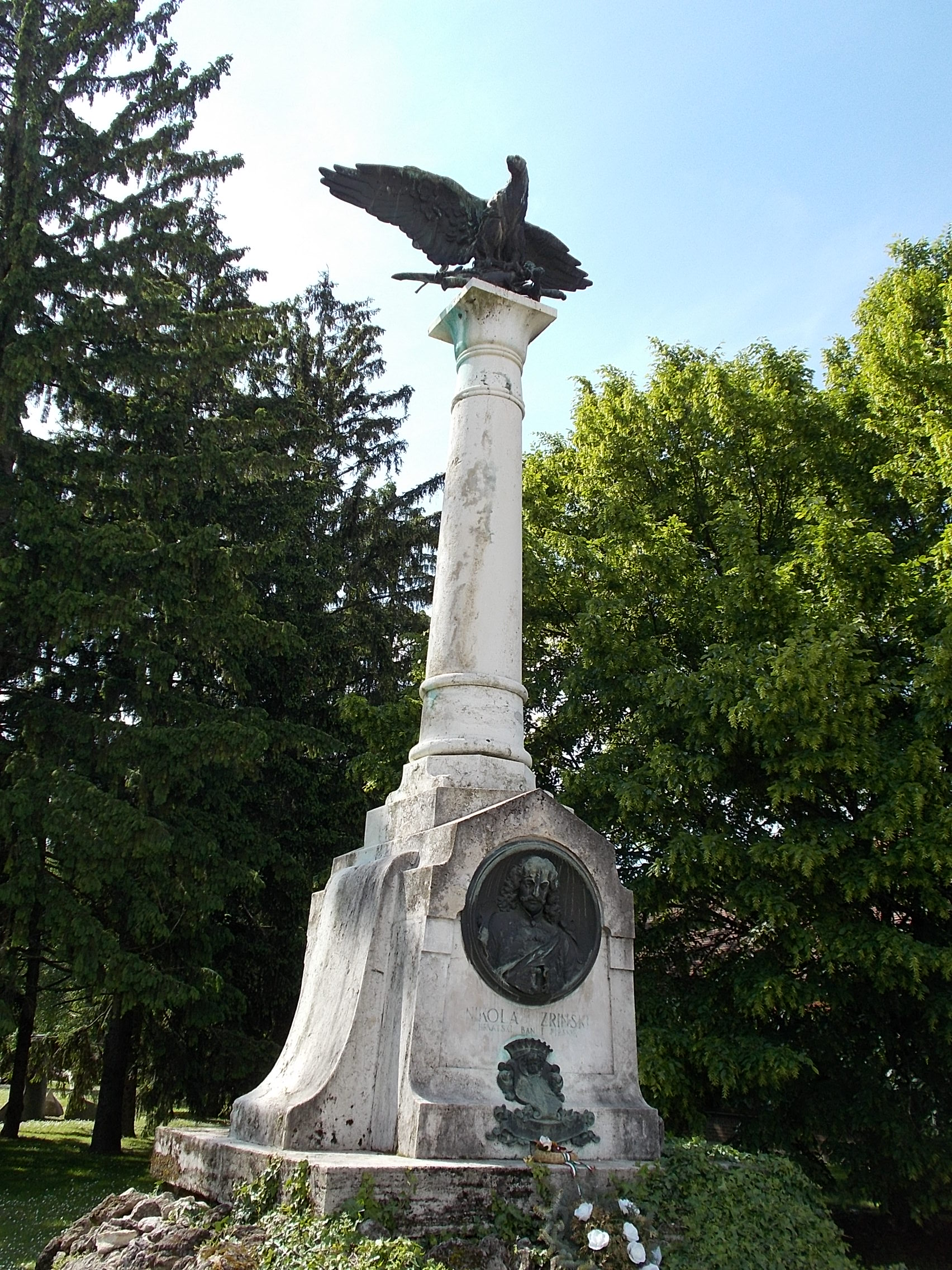
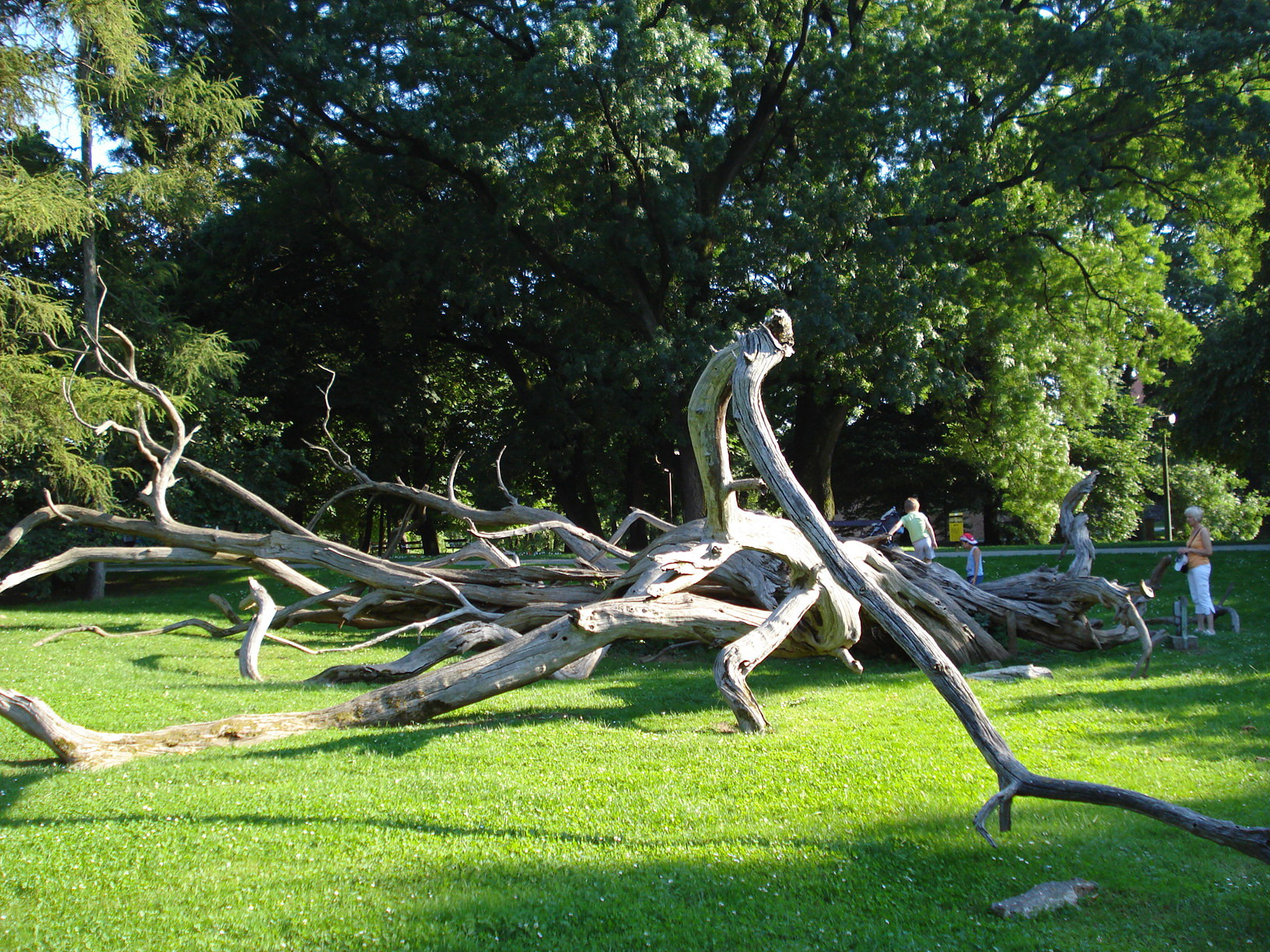
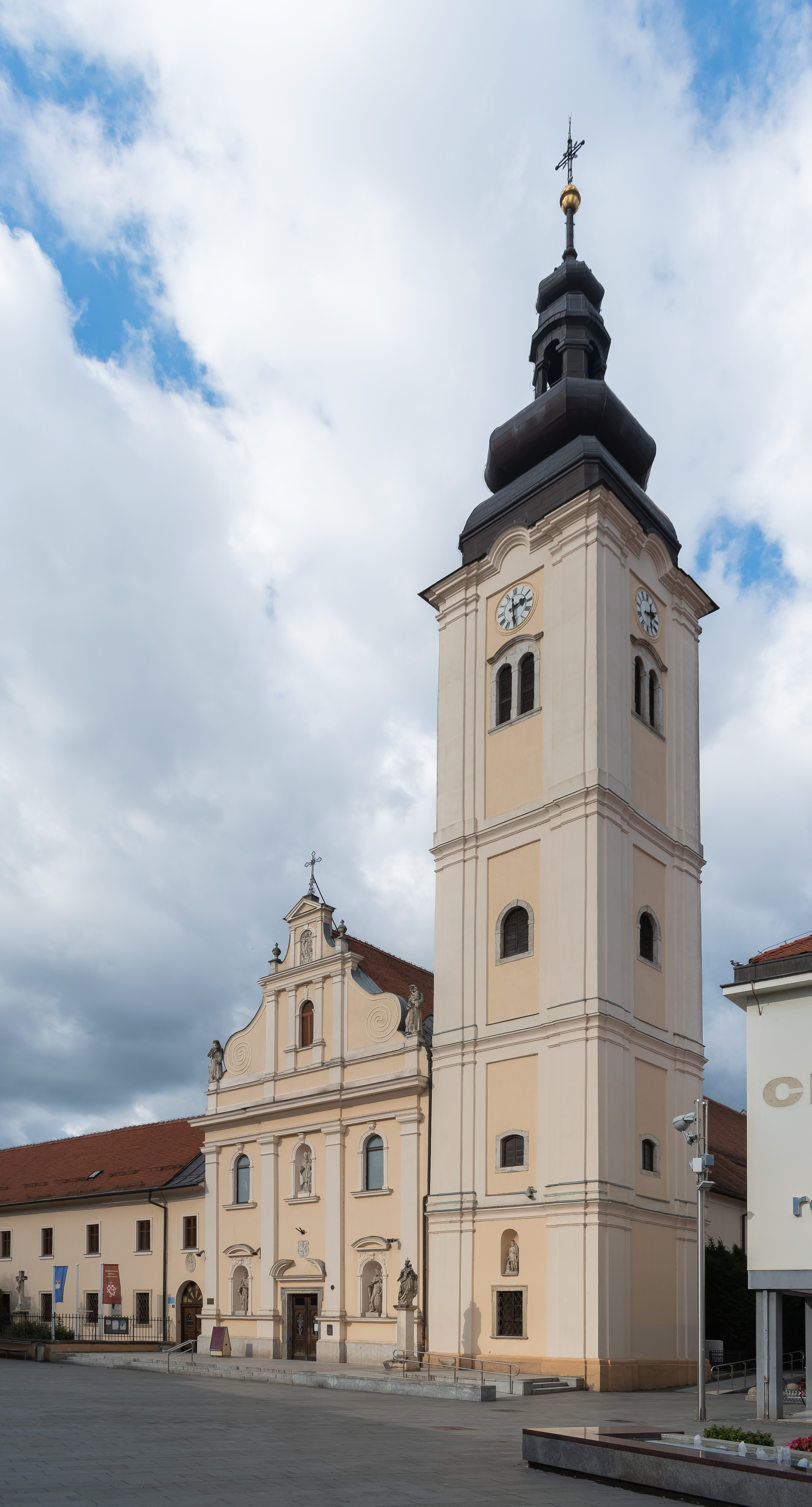
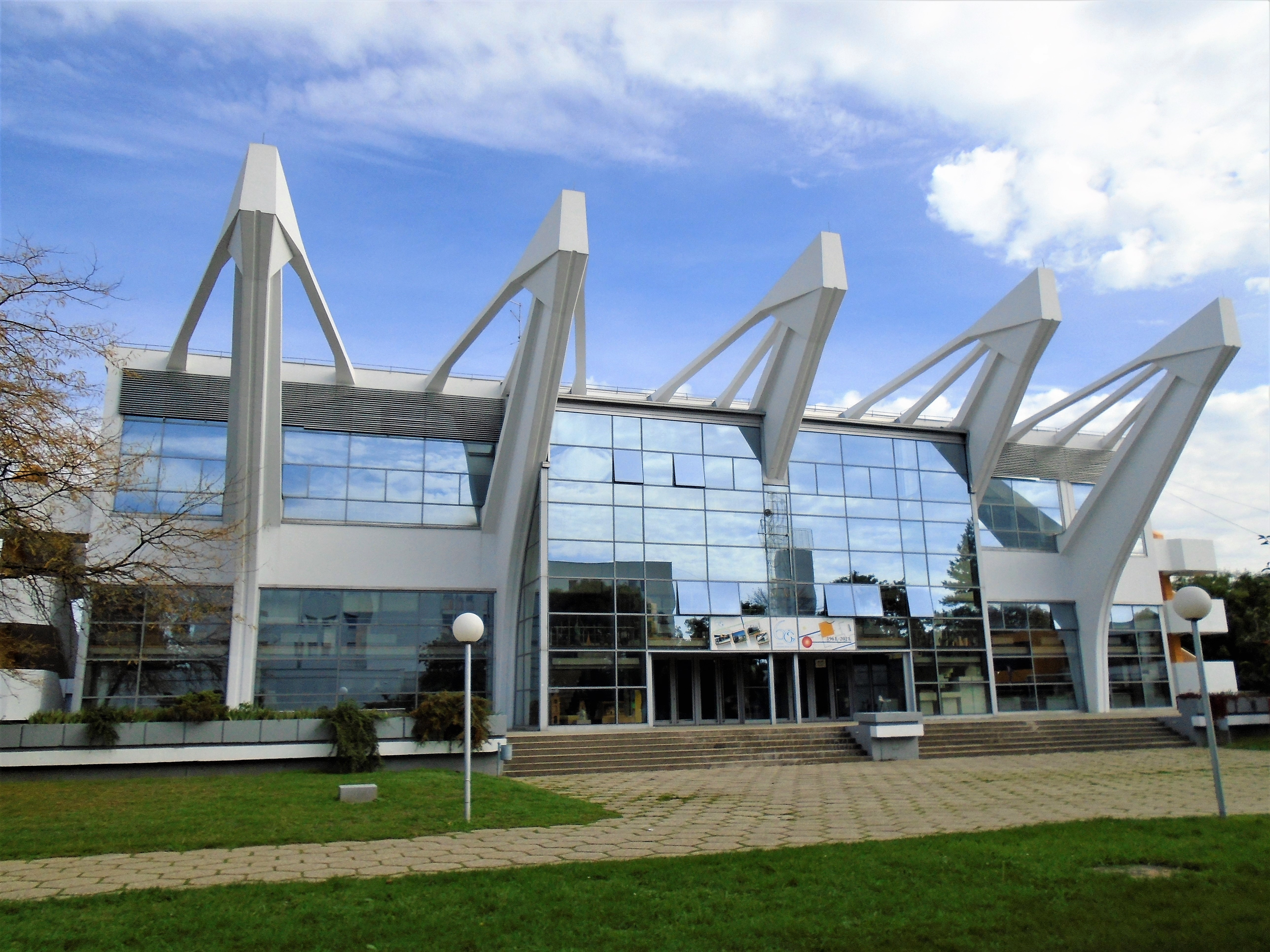
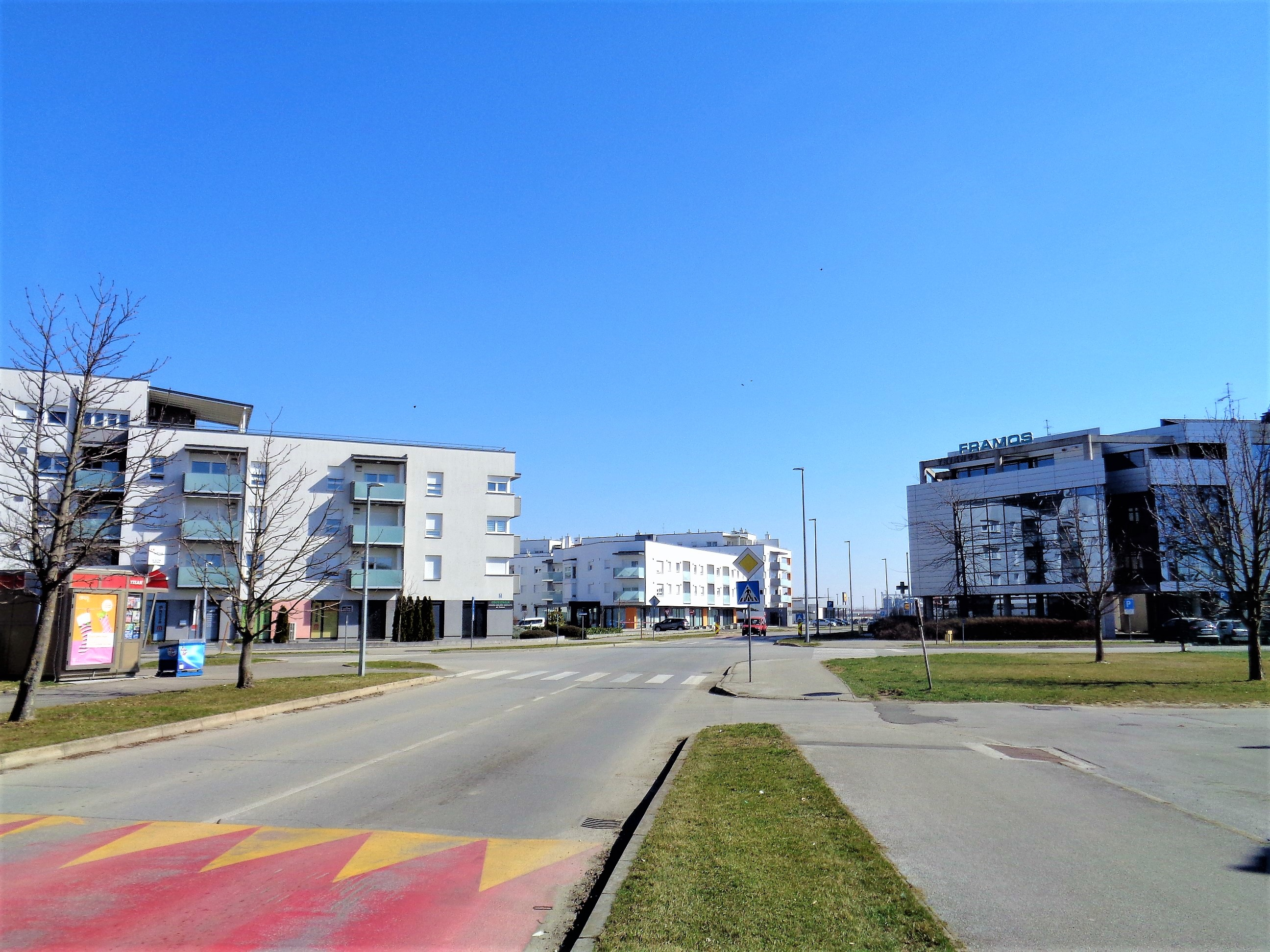
- Čakovec Castle Nikola Zrinski column Old acacia tree in the city park Church of Saint Nicholas Sports Hall Residential district

- Flag Coat of arms
- Nicknames: Grad Zrinskih; City of Zrinskis
- Interactive map of Čakovec
- Location of Čakovec in Croatia
- Coordinates: 46°23′10.58″N 16°26′08.57″E
- Country: Croatia
- Region: Northern Croatia (Međimurje)
- County: Međimurje County
- Named for: Csák I Hahót

Government
  - Mayor: Ljerka Cividini (NPS)

Area
  - City: 76.9 km^{2} (29.7 sq mi)
  - Urban: 16.8 km^{2} (6.5 sq mi)
- Elevation: 164 m (538 ft)

Population (2021)
  - City: 27,122
  - Density: 353/km^{2} (913/sq mi)
  - Urban: 15,078
  - Urban density: 898/km^{2} (2,320/sq mi)
- Time zone: UTC+1 (CET)
  - Summer (DST): UTC+2 (CEST)
- Postal code: HR-40 000
- Area code: +385 40
- Vehicle registration: ČK
- Highest elevation: 146 m
- Website: cakovec.hr

Čakovec (Croatian pronunciation: [tʃâkoʋets]; Hungarian: Csáktornya; Latin: Aquama; German: Tschakathurn) is a city in Northern Croatia, located around 90 kilometres (56 miles) north of Zagreb, the Croatian capital, and close to the borders with Slovenia and Hungary. Čakovec is both the county seat and the largest city of Međimurje County, the northernmost, smallest and most densely populated Croatian county. It is situated centrally in the lowland part of the region, along the Trnava river.

== History ==
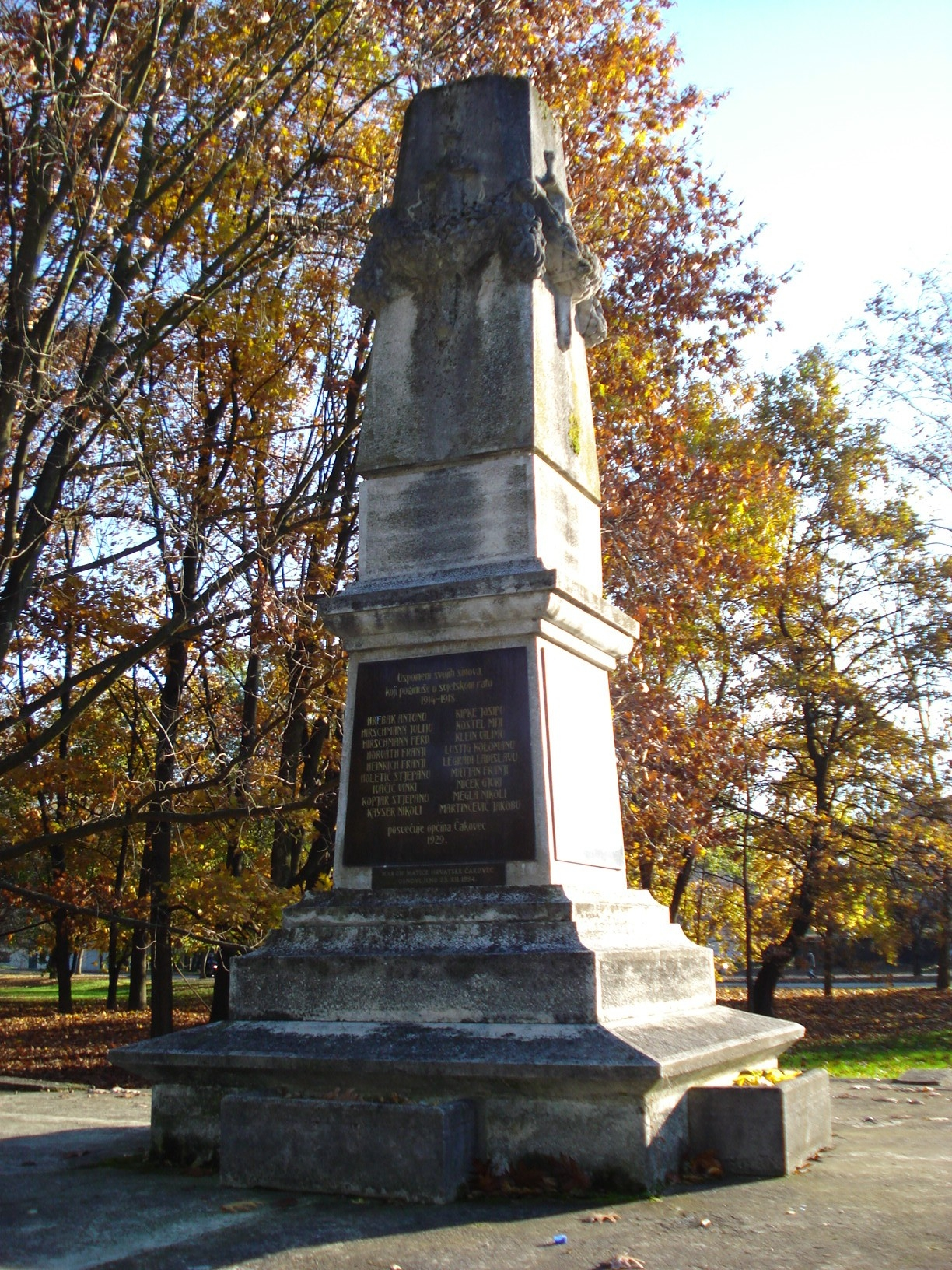
World War I cenotaph

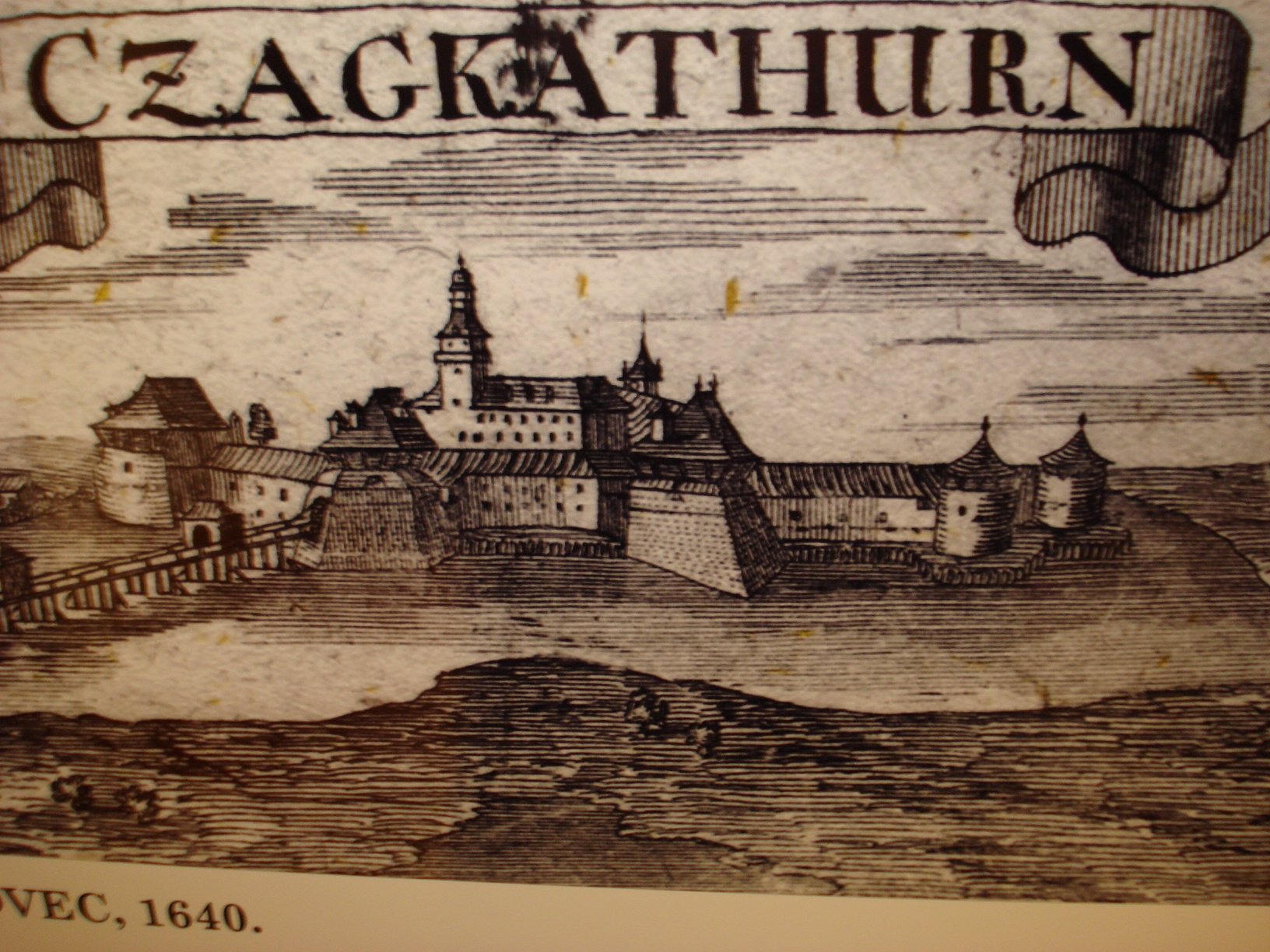
Zrinski Castle in 1640

According to the geographer Strabo's reports in the 1st century, today's location of the city of Čakovec was the site of Aquama (wet town) in Roman times and at the time a marshland, a military post and a legionnaire camp.

One popular legend describes a green pozoj (dragon) once dwelling beneath the city and causing natural disasters such as hail and earthquakes, with its head under the castle and its tail under the church, or vice versa. It could only be gotten rid of by a grabancijaš (dark magic student) who would use a golden bridle to control the dragon and ride it out of the city.

The name Čakovec (Hungarian: Csáktornya, German: Csakathurn or Tschakathurn) comes from the first name of the ispán Csák Hahót. With the beginning of the 13th century he erected the timber fortification which was later named Csák's tower (Croatian: Čakov toranj). It was mentioned for the first time in 1328 and the place appeared in the official books in 1333. From 1350 to 1397, it was in the possession of the House of Laczkfy, from 1405 to 1461 of the Counts of Celje and from 1473 to 1540 of the House of Ernušt. The town as well as Međimurje region was at the time part of the Varaždin county.

The period of more significant economic and cultural growth of Čakovec is considered to have started on 15 March 1546, when Nikola IV Zrinski of Szigetvár became the owner of the area. At that time the castle was lavishly decorated, surrounded by a park and sculptures of famous army leaders and monarchs. Duke Juraj IV Zrinski granted privileges to the inhabitants of the Čakovec fortress and its suburbs on 29 May 1579. This was the starting point for Čakovec to become a free market town and the date is celebrated today as "City Day". The Čakovec Castle which was owned by the House of Zrinski between the 16th and the 18th century is known today as the "Zrinski Old Town" (Stari grad Zrinskih) and is considered the main landmark of the city. It is located in the Zrinski Park (Perivoj Zrinskih) only a few steps from the central square.

When count Johann Michael von Althan became the owner of Međimurje in 1719, the next year Čakovec and the whole region was detached from Croatia and included into Zala county (i.e. into the main part of the Habsburg Kingdom of Hungary).

In 1738, the town was devastated by an earthquake, in 1741 by a large fire. At the end of the 18th century, the owners of the town became counts from the Festetics family, and the town was turned into a big estate where industry, crafts and trade developed. In 1848, the ban Josip Jelačić captured Čakovec from the Hungarians and annexed it with Croatia. The first railroad track was built here in 1860 to help connect Budapest with the ports of Fiume and Trieste. Another earthquake hit the town in 1880. The town was connected by railroad with Mursko Središće and Lendava in 1889 and in 1893 electricity was introduced.

The DVD "Čakovečki mlinovi" was founded in 1924, and the DVD "Čateks" in 1946.

Čakovec was the seat of a district (Hungarian: járás) in Zala county of the Kingdom of Hungary until 1918 when it was captured by an armed force on behalf of the Kingdom of Serbs, Croats and Slovenes. It again became part of Hungary between 1941-45 during World War II, until it was returned on 6 April 1945 by the Soviet Red Army with Marshal Fyodor Tolbukhin in command.

During the breakup of Yugoslavia in the 1990s, Čakovec experienced limited military activity. At the beginning of the Ten-Day War in Slovenia in June 1991, a tank column of the JNA advancing from the barracks in Varaždin towards Gornja Radgona was met with resistance from the local population. With the onset of the Croatian War of Independence in September 1991, the JNA barracks in the city were captured by Croatian forces during the Battle of the Barracks. In retaliation, the Yugoslav Air Force launched missile attacks on the nearby Pribislavec airfield on several occasions later that year.

=== Recent years ===
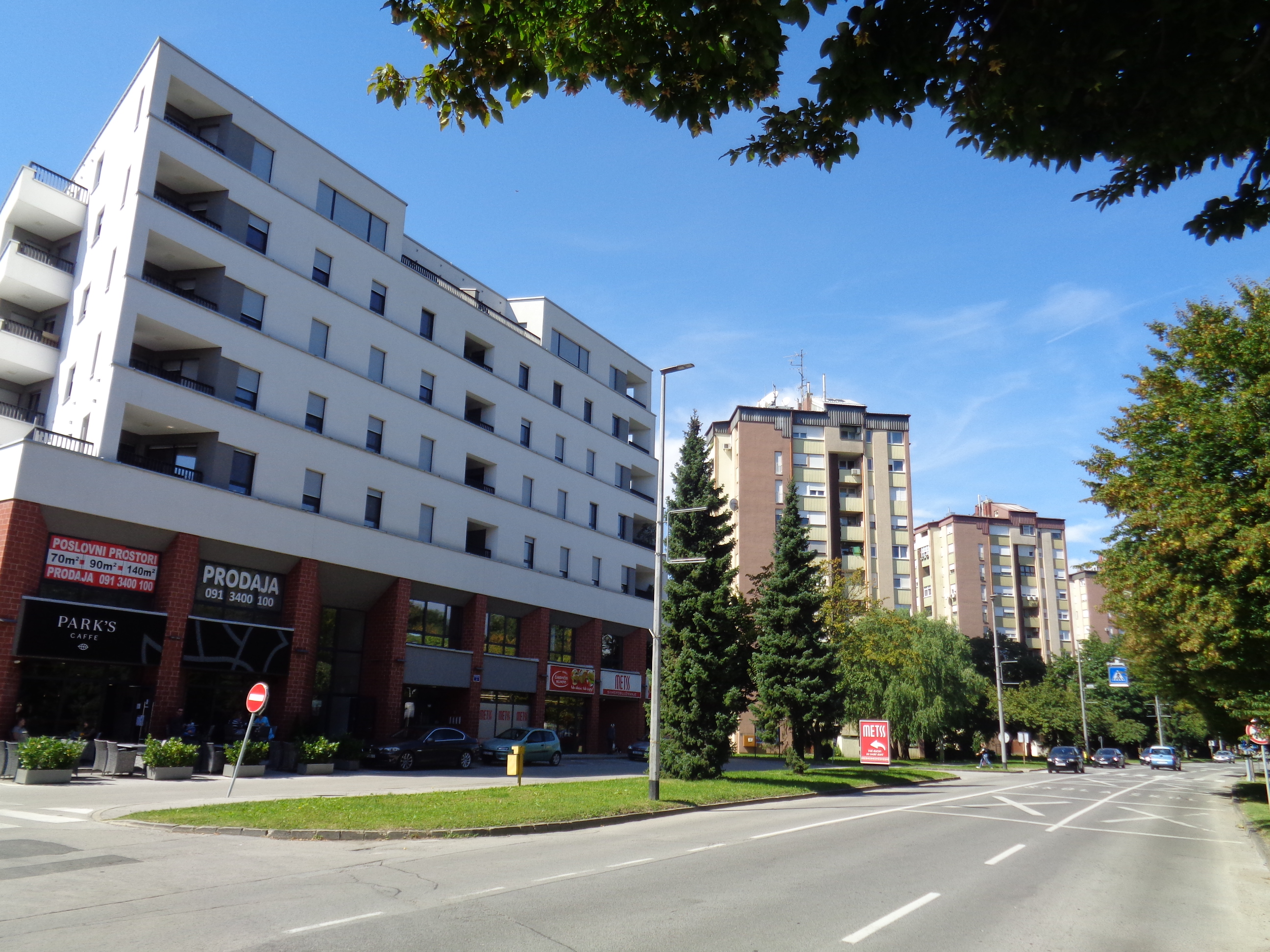
Vukovar Street in Čakovec

In the late 1990s and throughout the 2000s, several modern buildings were built and opened to the public. In 1999, a brand new fitness complex including four indoor swimming pools was opened as part of "Mladost", the city's sports and recreation complex. In 2003 a renovated sports hall, originally built in the 1970s and belonging to the construction industry high school, was also opened as a part of the center for sports and recreation and hosted several group matches of the 2003 World Women's Handball Championship. Beginning in the late 1990s and early 2000s several large shopping centers and car showrooms emerged in the city, mostly in its northwestern part. Čakovec was rewarded The Green Flower award for the tidiest continental city in Croatia several times. Čakovec is the first city of the former Yugoslavia to have installed completely electronic information spots, located at the Republic Square and the Franciscan Square in the Center and at the Square of Saint Anthony of Padua in the Jug district. Čakovec is known as the city of traffic circles, because, during the late 1990s and early 2000s, all of its traffic lights in the inner part of the city were removed and replaced with traffic circles or rotaries, virtually eliminating traffic jams. Although Čakovec is a small city by global parameters, its large working force which comes from all over the county, its location and importance in the region caused many traffic jams on the crossroads. Čakovec is the home of prominent Croatian punk bands, including Bakterije and Motorno Ulje.

== Demographics ==
Historical population
Year	Pop.	±%
1857	5,790	—
1869	7,002	+20.9%
1880	8,580	+22.5%
1890	9,375	+9.3%
1900	10,815	+15.4%
1910	11,425	+5.6%
1921	13,034	+14.1%
1931	15,108	+15.9%
1948	17,034	+12.7%
1953	18,119	+6.4%
1961	20,676	+14.1%
1971	23,775	+15.0%
1981	27,356	+15.1%
1991	29,996	+9.7%
2001	30,455	+1.5%
2011	27,104	−11.0%
2021	27,122	+0.1%
Source: Naselja i stanovništvo Republike Hrvatske 1857–2021, DZS

In the 2021 census, the city of Čakovec had a population of 27,122 in the following settlements:

- Čakovec, population 15,078
- Ivanovec, population 1,922
- Krištanovec, population 575
- Kuršanec, population 1,727
- Mačkovec, population 1,222
- Mihovljan, population 1,391
- Novo Selo na Dravi, population 557
- Novo Selo Rok, population 1,320
- Savska Ves, population 1,165
- Slemenice, population 215
- Šandorovec, population 305
- Štefanec, population 684
- Totovec, population 491
- Žiškovec, population 470

The city's population primarily consists of ethnic Croats at 90.66%, with the largest minority being Romani at 4.88% of the municipality. Other ethnic groups in the city are Serbs, Hungarians, Slovenes and Albanians.

City of Čakovec: Population trends 1857–2021
v

population	5790	7002	8580	9375	10815	11425	13034	15108	17034	18119	20676	23775	27356	29996	30455	27104	27122
	1857	1869	1880	1890	1900	1910	1921	1931	1948	1953	1961	1971	1981	1991	2001	2011	2021

Sources: Croatian Bureau of Statistics publications

== Climate ==
Between 1981 and 2019, the highest temperature recorded at the local weather station was 39.0 °C (102.2 °F), on 20 July 2007. The coldest temperature was −26.7 °C (−16.1 °F), on 13 February 1985.

== Administration ==
The current mayor of Čakovec is Ljerka Cividini (NPS) and the Čakovec City Council consists of 19 seats.

Groups	Councilors per group
NPS-HSLS-HSU	10 / 19
SDP-MDS	4 / 19
HDZ	2 / 19
Independent	2 / 19
HSS	1 / 19

=== City districts and neighborhoods ===
The City of Čakovec is divided into kotars and city districts. The kotars of Čakovec are:

- Istok
- Jug
- Zapad

The city districts/neighborhoods (Croatian: gradske četvrti/kvartovi) of Čakovec are:
I. Centar
II. Jug
III. Martane
IV. Buzovec
V. Sajmište
VI. Globetka
VII. Špice

== Education ==
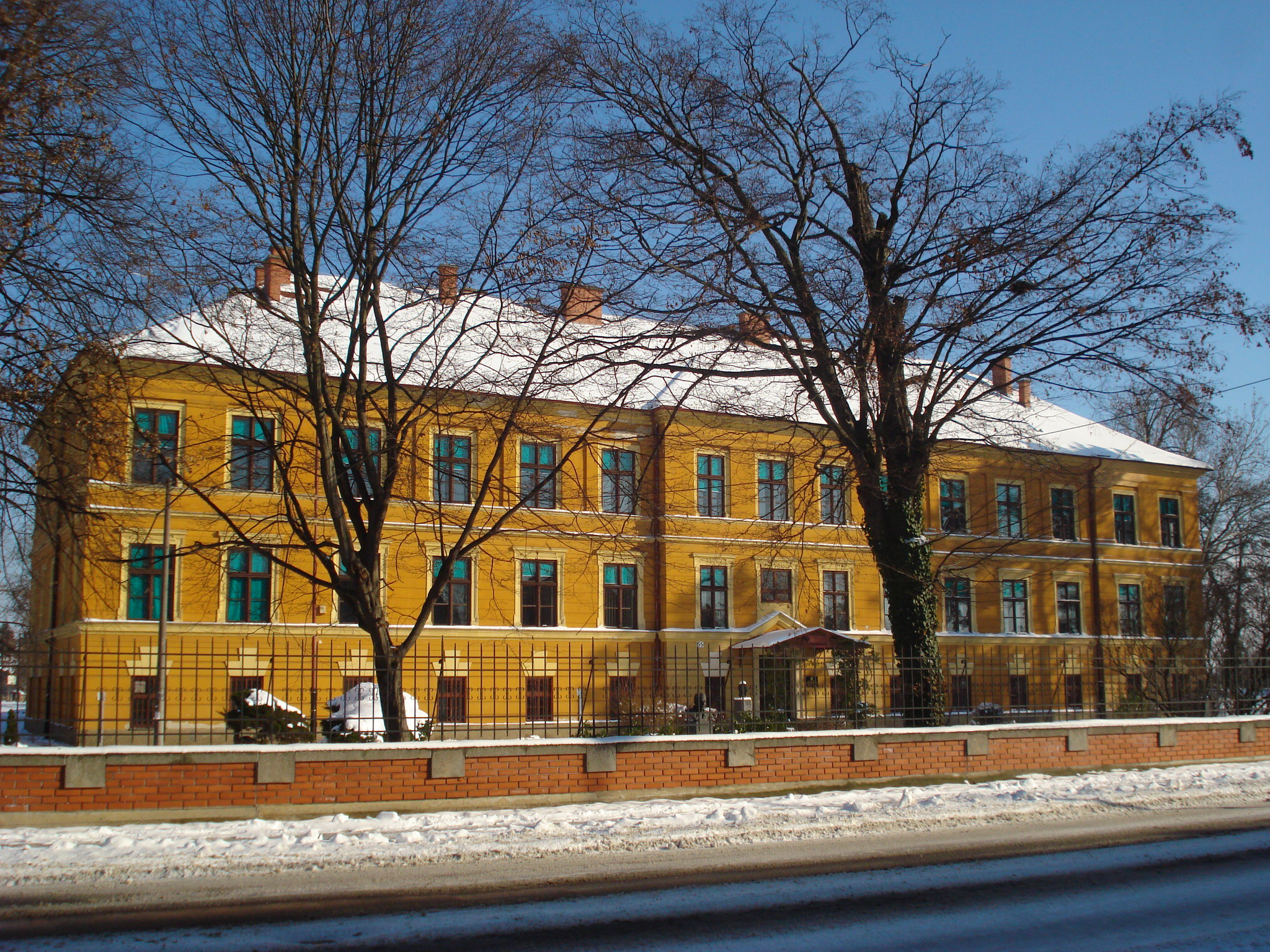
Teachers' Training College

The city of Čakovec currently has three elementary schools and several secondary schools including a Gymnasium and three high schools that offer education in the fields of technology, crafts, economics and construction. The Teachers' Training College (Croatian: Visoka učiteljska škola) is the city's only institution for higher education that lasts more than 3 years. In recent years, the city opened its own institution of higher education called MEV — Međimursko veleučilište u Čakovcu (Polytechnic of Međimurje in Čakovec), offering 3-year studies (180 ECTS points) in Computer Science and Management of Tourism and Sport. The city is also known for its School of Animated Film (ŠAF - Škola Animiranog Filma), which has been hosting an annual international animated film summer workshop for several decades, bringing world-renowned animators to Čakovec.

== Economy ==
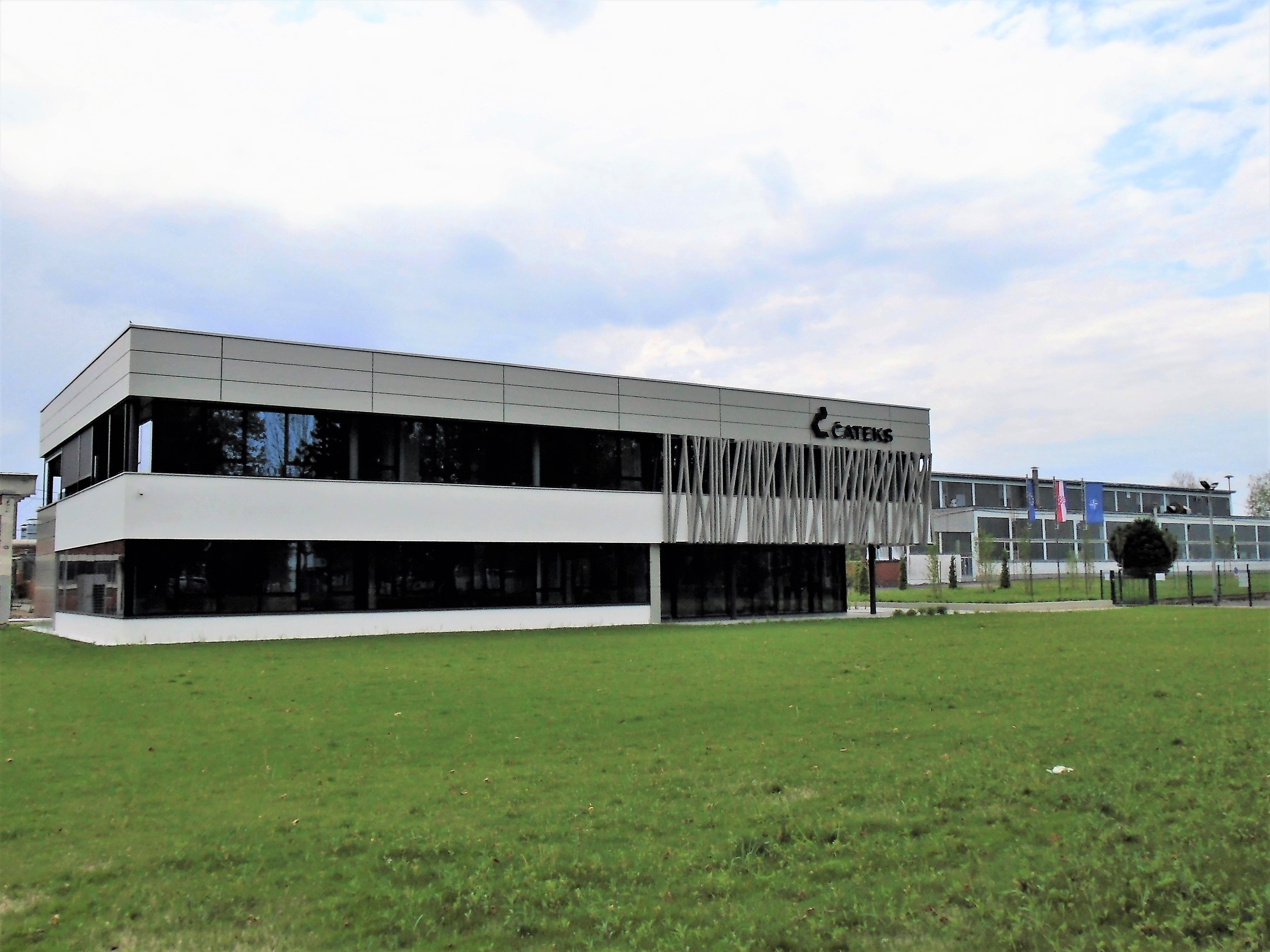
Čateks, a textile company

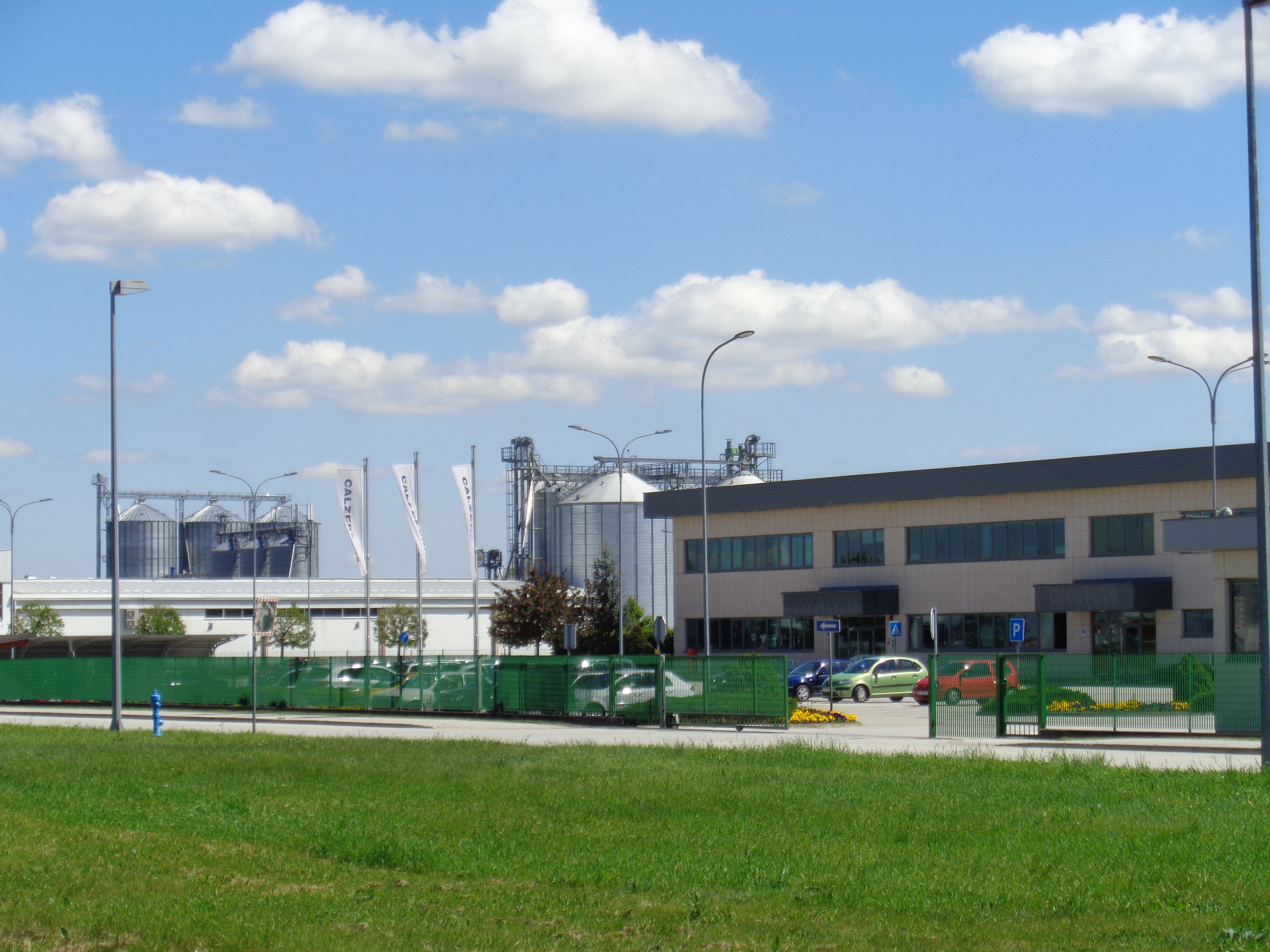
Čakovec-East industrial zone

The city of Čakovec has a highly developed industry and it is the focal point for communication, business, trade and education in the Međimurje County. The economy of the city is based on textile, footwear, food processing and metal plants — in 2023, the total profit of entrepreneurs based in the city accounted to €1.36 billion. The Čakovec-based company TIZ Zrinski is the largest printing and publishing company in the county as well as one of the major such companies in northern Croatia. Many books published in the country are printed in this factory.

The city is also a base for several companies engaged in construction, production of building materials, and plastics. The largest of them, Građevni kombinat 'Međimurje', which employed over 8,000 workers in the 1980s, ceased to exist in 2010, but some of its parts recovered and continued to do business as independent companies (e.g. Međimurje PMP, Međimurje-Tegra, Međimurje-plin, EKO-Međimurje, Instalomont-Termocentar).

Some of the largest companies based in the city include the textile and clothing manufacturer Čateks as well as the footwear manufacturer Jelen. Međimurska trikotaža Čakovec (MTČ) was one of the largest Croatian knitwear factories but it went bankrupt in 2016. The companies Čakovečki mlinovi (milling) and Vajda (meat products) are major fresh food producers in the city. Promming is also one of the biggest factories in Čakovec; it produces metal shelves designed specially for supermarkets.

== Sights, facilities and events ==
Most of the historical buildings in Čakovec are located in the town center or in the centrally located Zrinski Park, and the town's historical core has been well preserved. The Čakovec Castle near the park houses a museum with some 17,000 exhibits. Other landmark buildings in the town centre are a palace built in the Vienna Secession style (Secesijska palača), and Saint Nicholas' Church (Crkva Svetog Nikole). The Southern Čakovec (Čakovečki jug) is a relatively new neighborhood, with modern houses and buildings including the Church of Saint Anthony of Padua (Crkva Svetog Antuna Padovanskog) and a new elementary school with a sports hall, outdoor basketball and handball grounds and a running track.

The city has a casino, designed by architect Henrik Böhm.

At the central square there is a library, a theater, a cinema, a large shopping center and a few confectioners' shops and restaurants. Other businesses in the town center are mostly clothing stores, bookshops, electronics stores and finance companies. A hospital and the central bus station are located only a few steps from town centre. The largest hotel in Čakovec is located across the park, about 300–400 meters from the central square, and there is also a smaller one in close proximity of the main square.

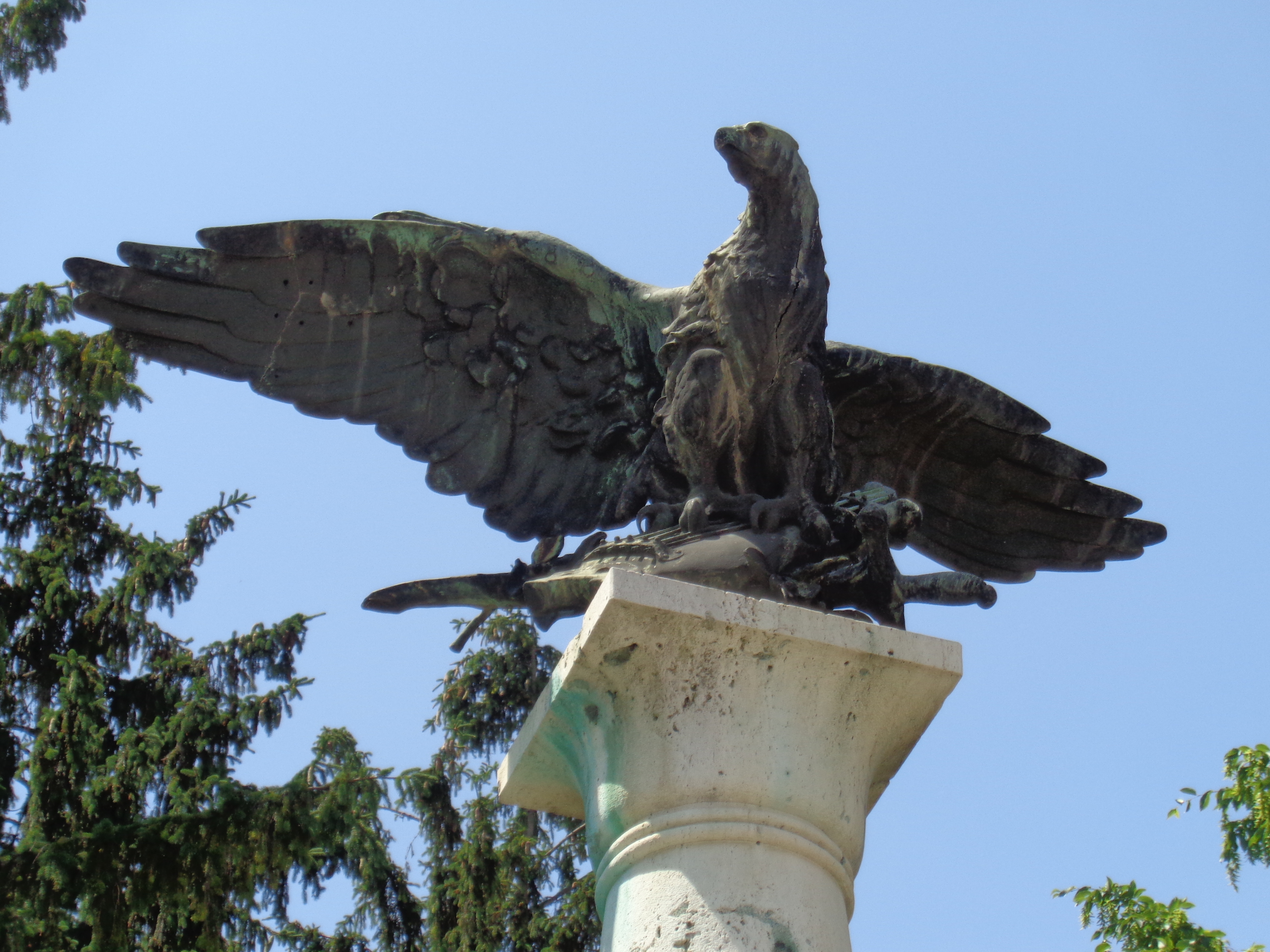
Eagle on the memorial column

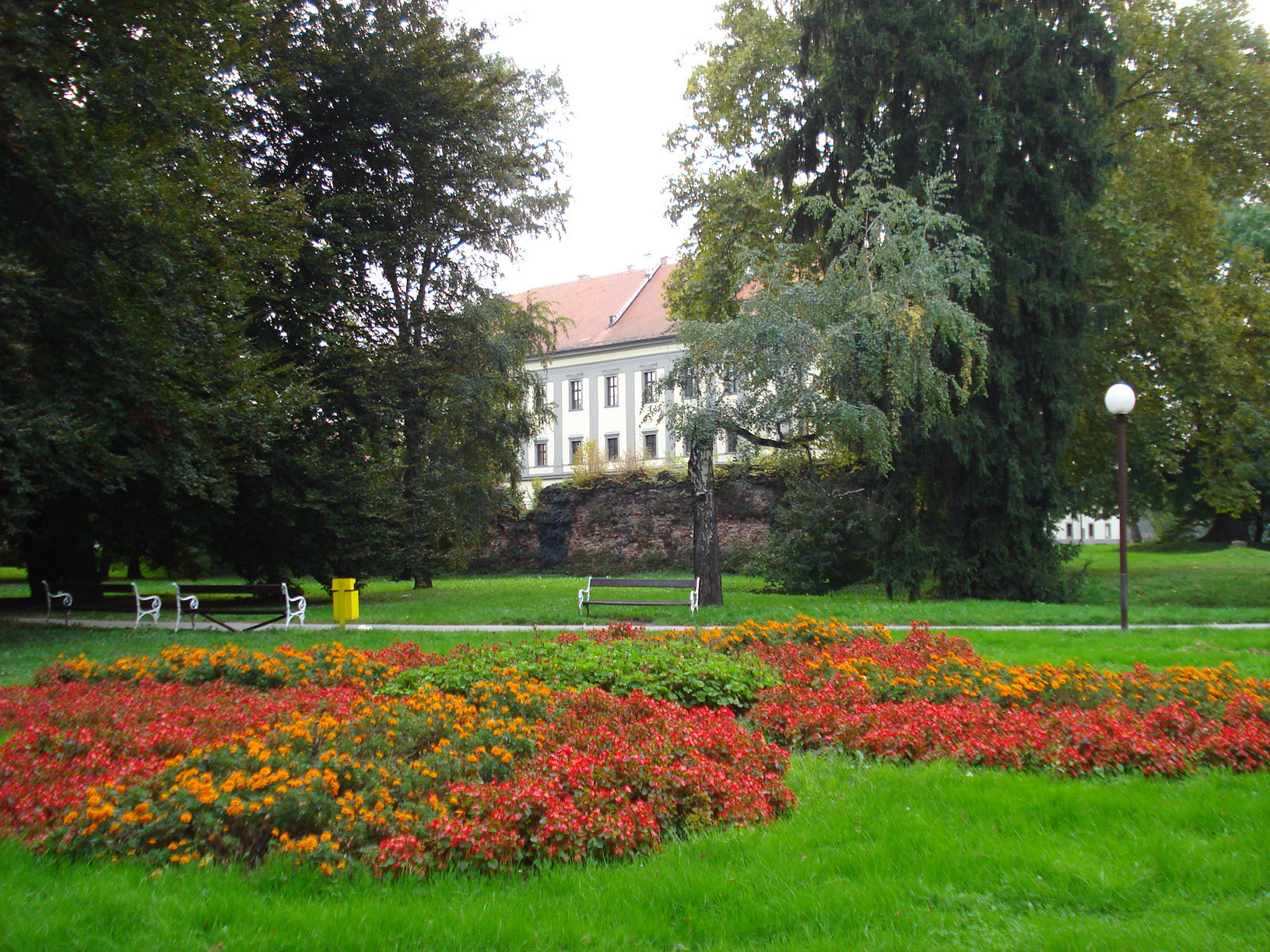
Greenery in the city park

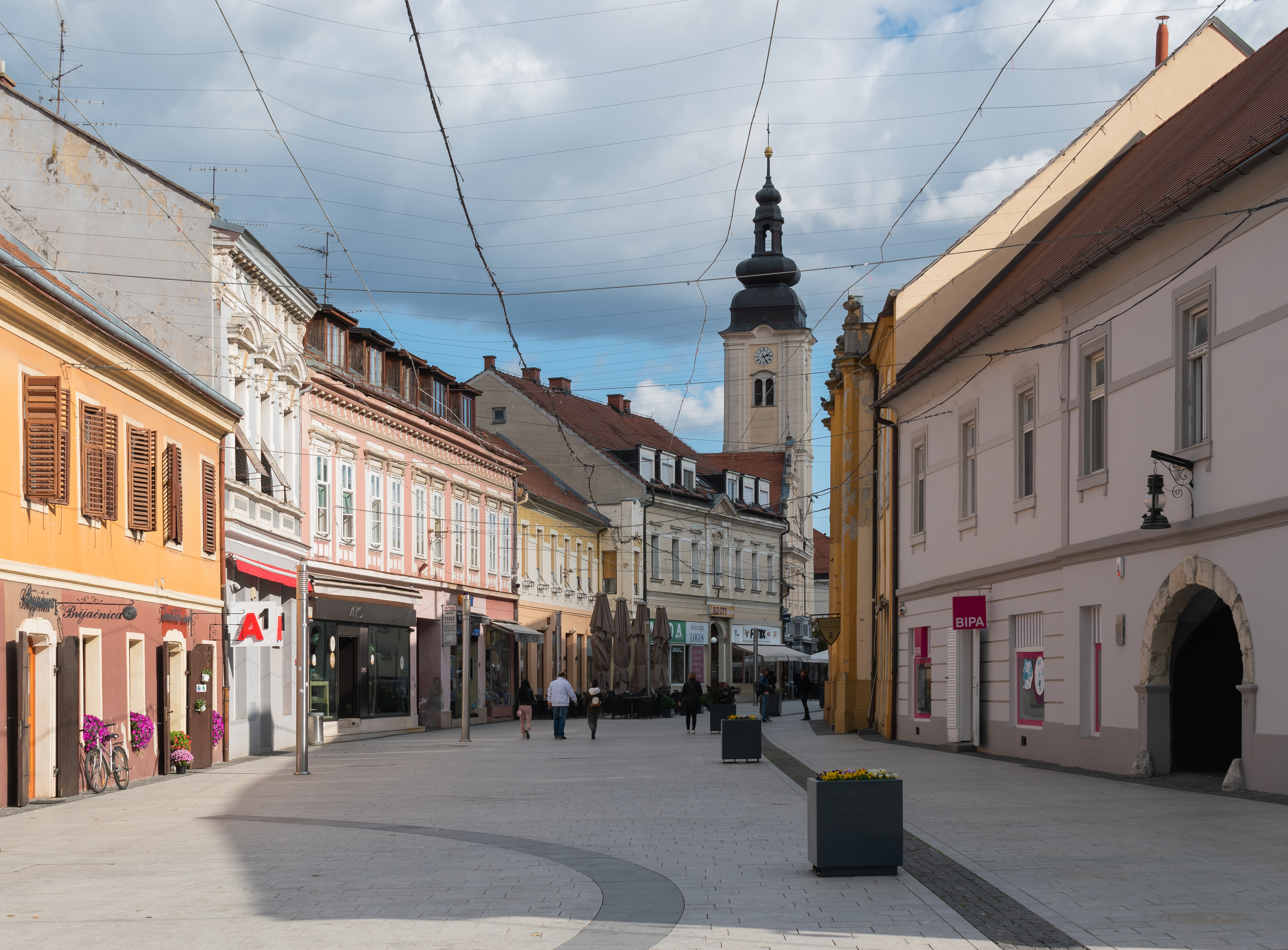
King Tomislav Street, a central promenade

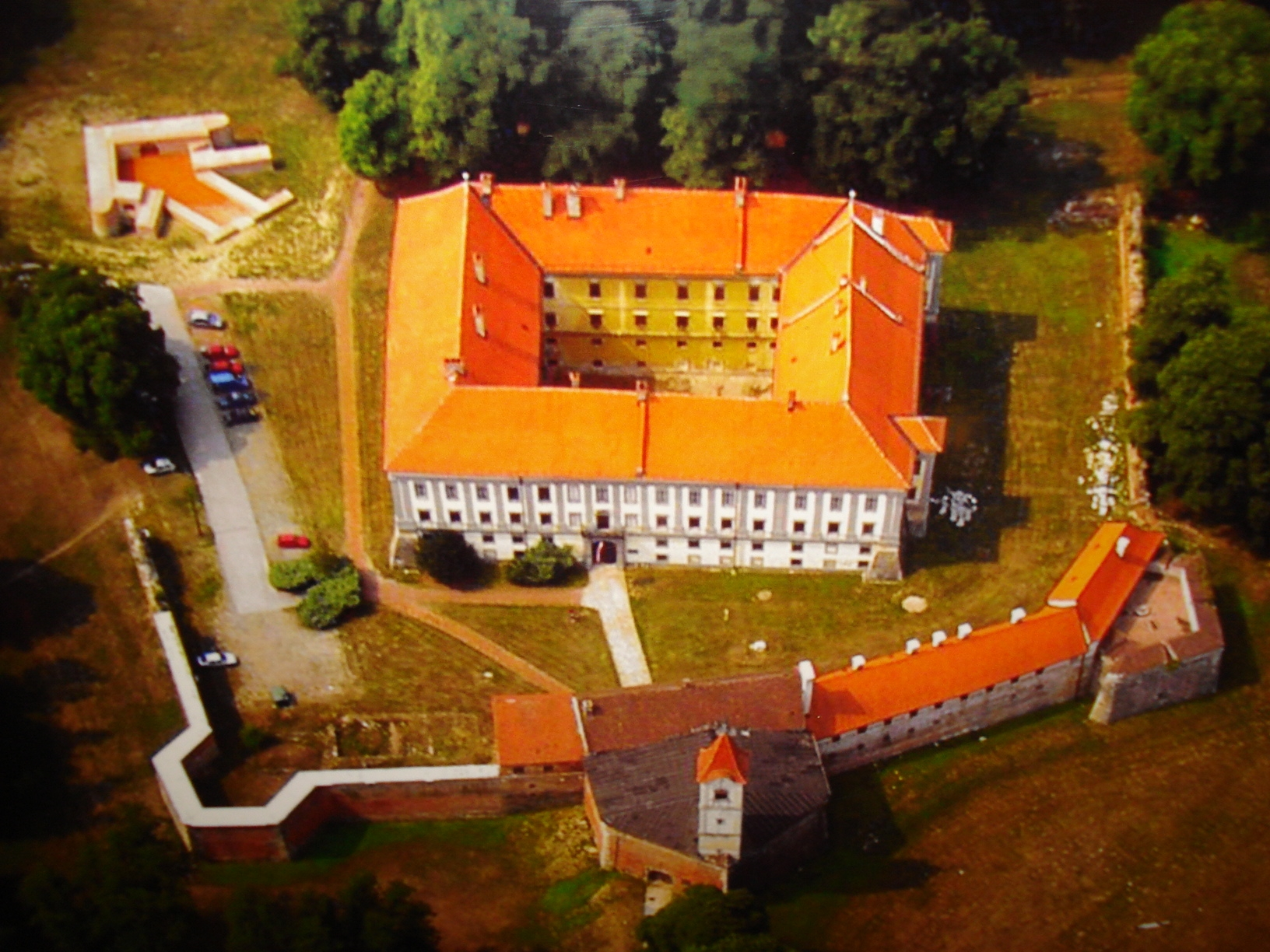
Čakovec Castle of the Zrinski family - bird's eye view

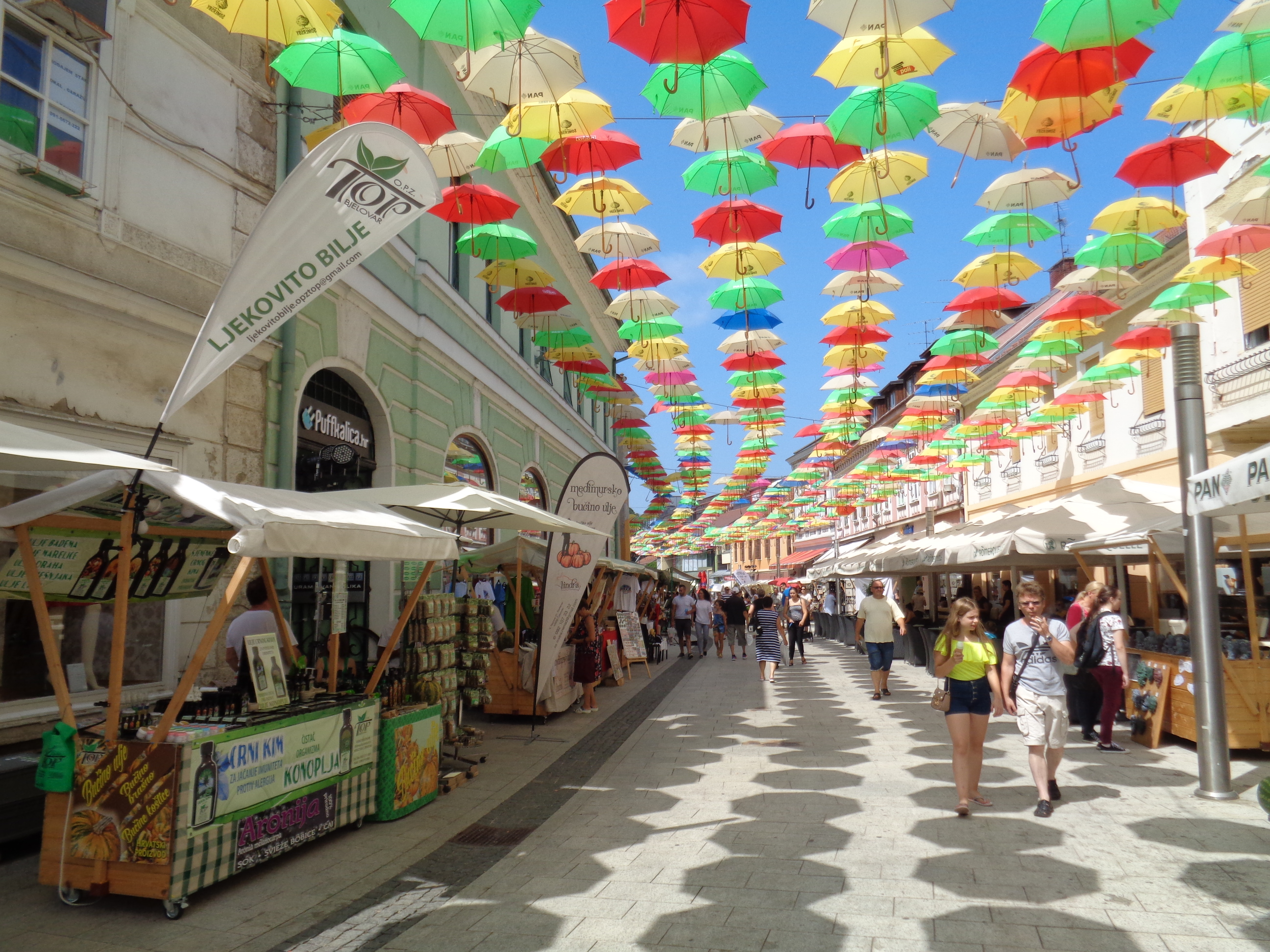
Porcijunkulovo manifestation

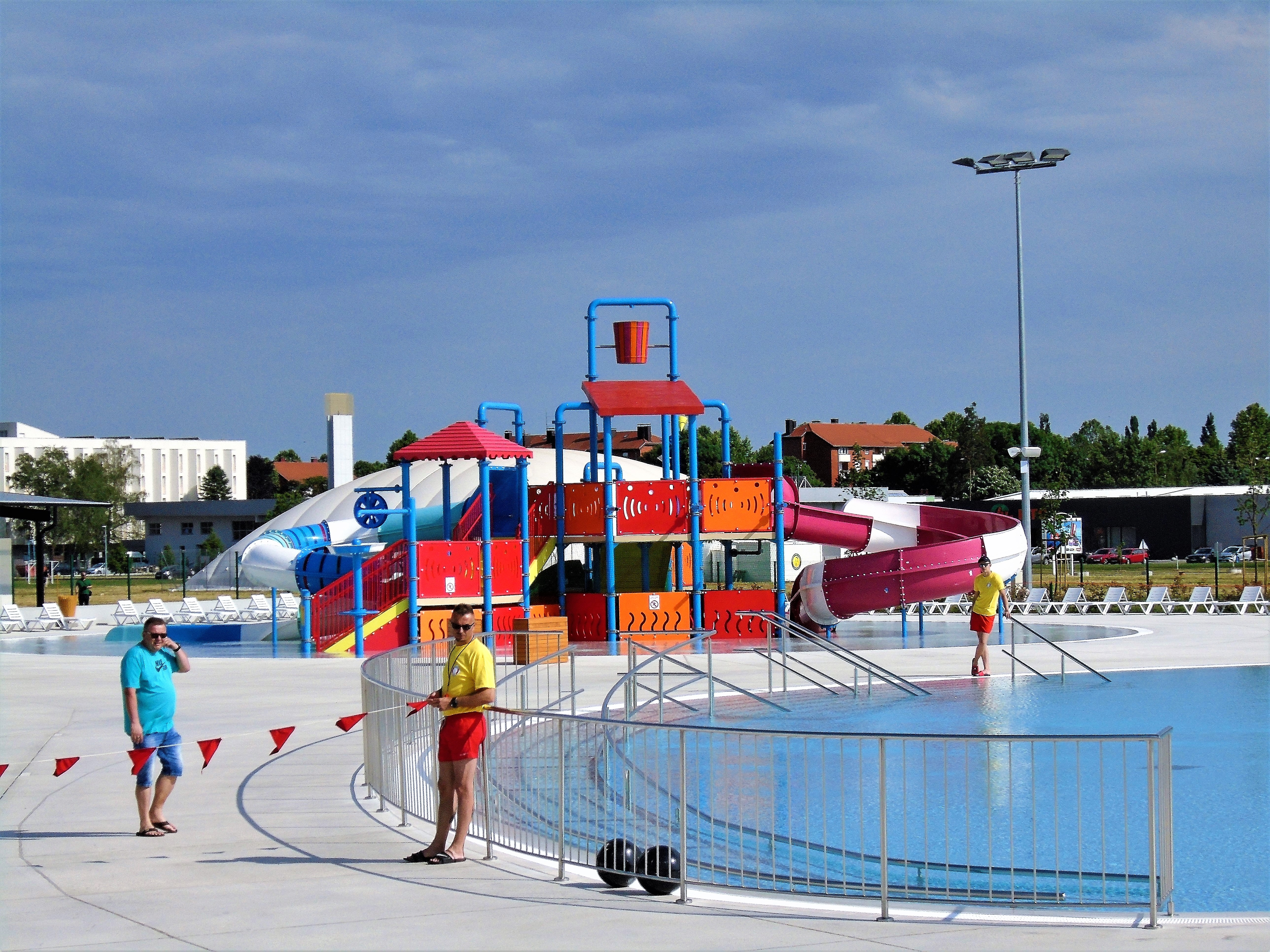
Outdoor swimming pools

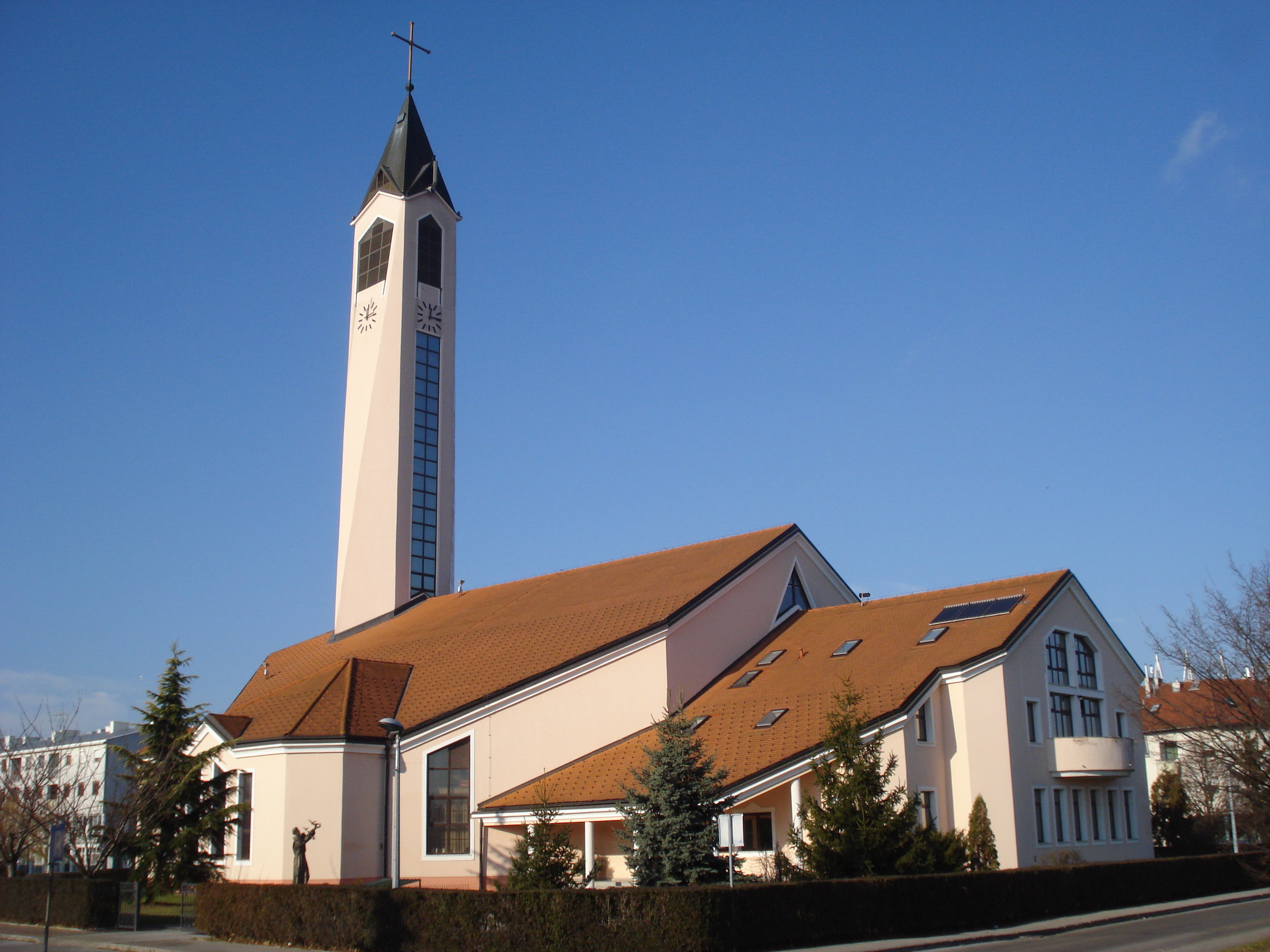
Church of Saint Anthony of Padua

== Transportation ==
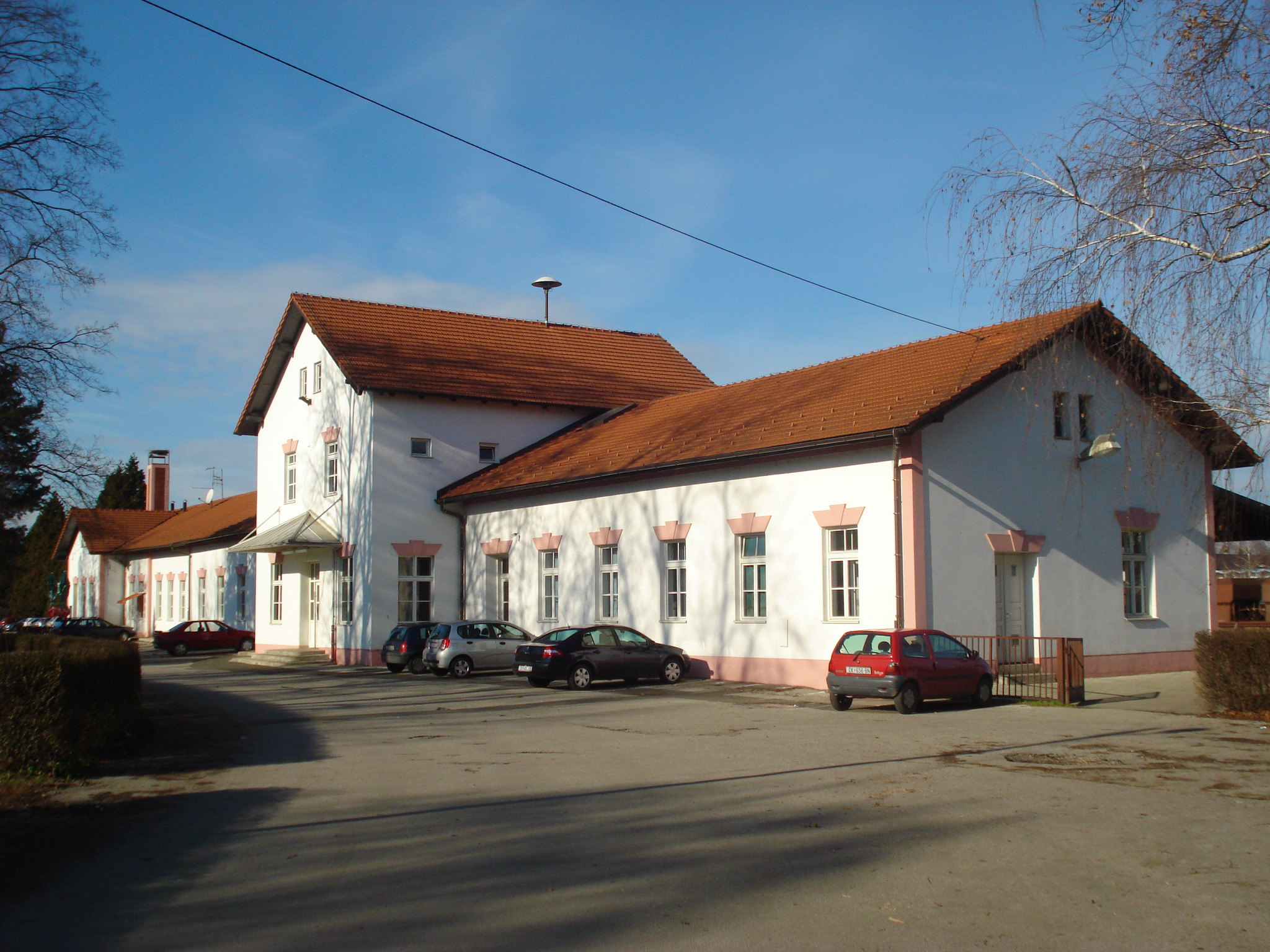
Railway station

The city of Čakovec is easily accessible by road or a railroad track. The road infrastructure is good and includes a new expressway connecting the Hungary border-crossing point in Goričan with Zagreb, Karlovac and the Adriatic Sea coast. There is also a southern bypass which was built in the beginning of the second half of the first decade in the 21st century. The city is connected to local municipalities with an efficient public transportation system. It has two train stations: Čakovec main train station and Čakovec-Buzovec, as well as a central bus station with a taxi rank, located near the central square. In the adjacent village of Pribislavec there's a small sports airport, where an annual aero-meeting takes place, as well as panoramic flights over the city and county in the summer. The airport is located approximately three kilometers east from the downtown.

== Sports ==
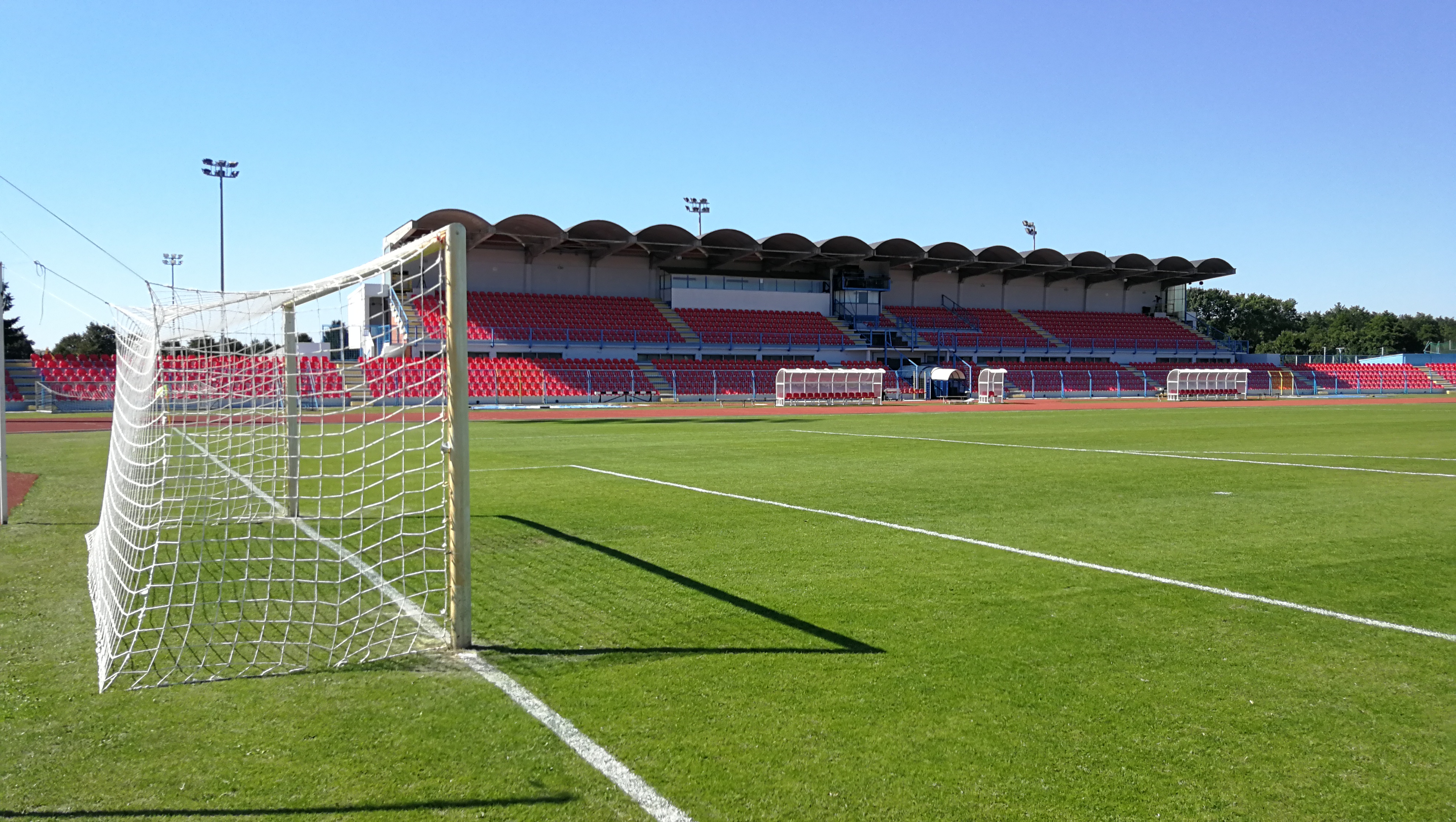
SRC Mladost is a multi-purpose stadium

The sports-related activities in the city of Čakovec are mostly centered in its northwestern part, where the center for sports and recreation is located. The center includes a football and athletics stadium with a capacity of around 8,000 places, an indoor hall mostly used for handball, basketball and volleyball matches and a swimming pool complex, where several swimming schools are organized throughout the year.

The local branch of the HPS is HPD "Železna Gora", which had 36 members in 1936 under the Blaž Ilijanić presidency. At the time, it had a ski section. Membership fell to 27 in 1937, but rose to 30 in 1938.

=== Sports clubs ===
- NK Međimurje, football club in the Croatian Second League
- ŽNK Katarina Zrinski, women's football club
- KK Međimurje, basketball club
- MRK Čakovec, handball club in the Croatian First League of Handball
- ŽRK Zrinski, women's handball club in the Croatian First League
- TK Franjo Punčec, tennis club
- KK Željezničar Čakovec, ninepin bowling club
- IHK Pozoji, inline hockey club
- Disc Golf club Zrinski

== International relations ==
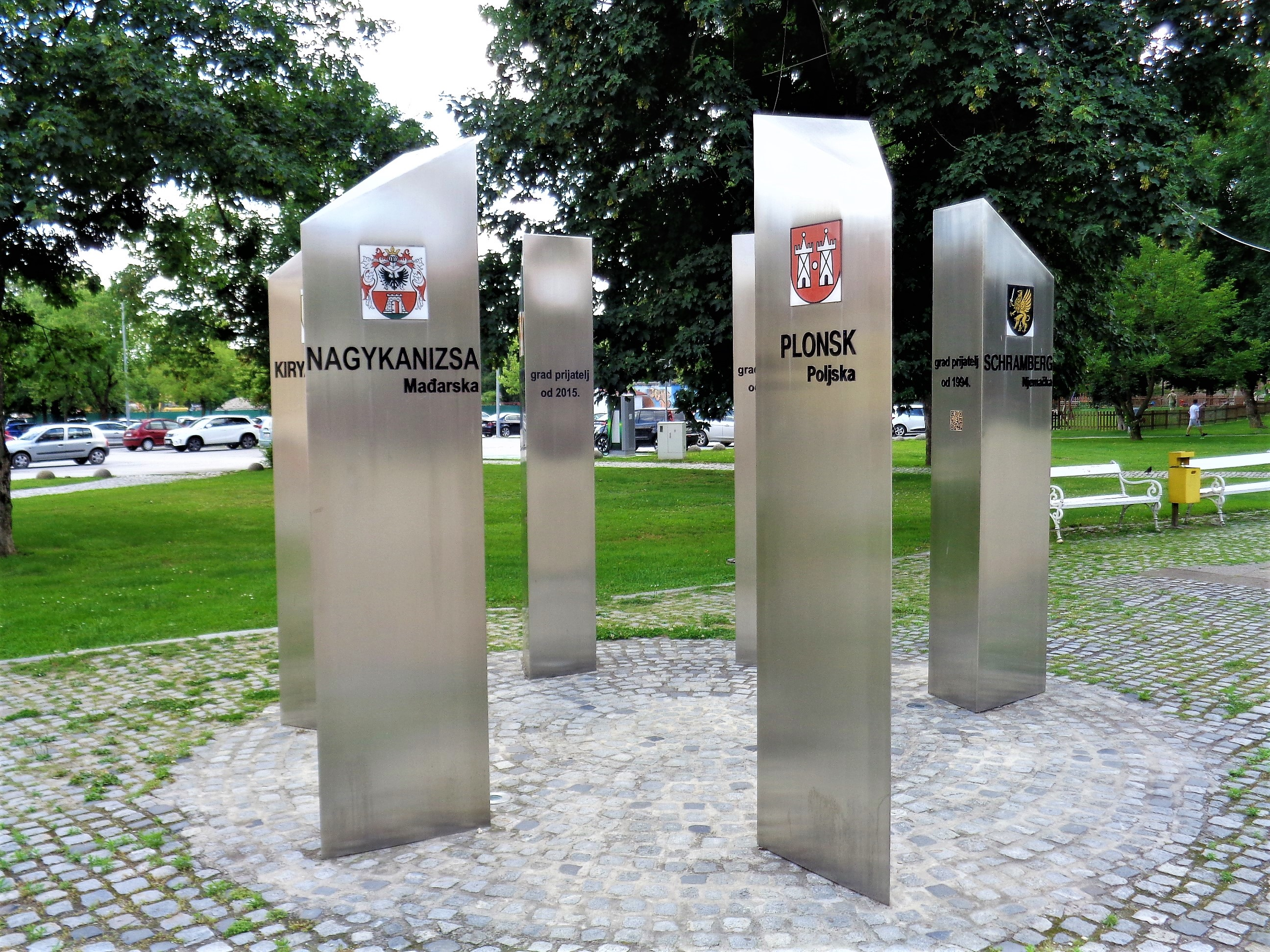
Twin towns columns

=== Twin towns — Sister cities ===
Čakovec is currently twinned with these cities or municipalities:

- Schramberg, Germany
- Płońsk, Poland
- Nagykanizsa, Hungary
- Kiryat Tiv'on, Israel
- Blagoevgrad, Bulgaria
- Szigetvár, Hungary
- Yancheng, China

== Notable people ==
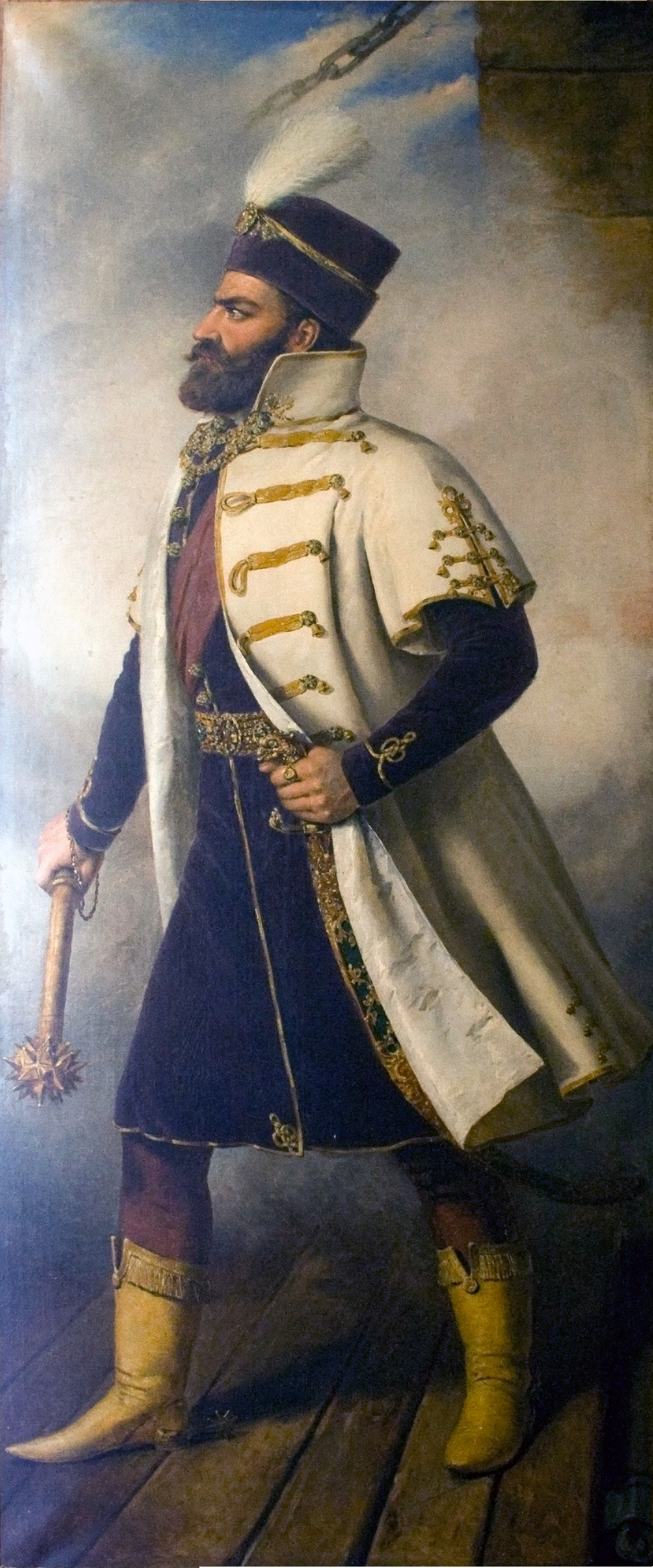
Nikola IV Zrinski

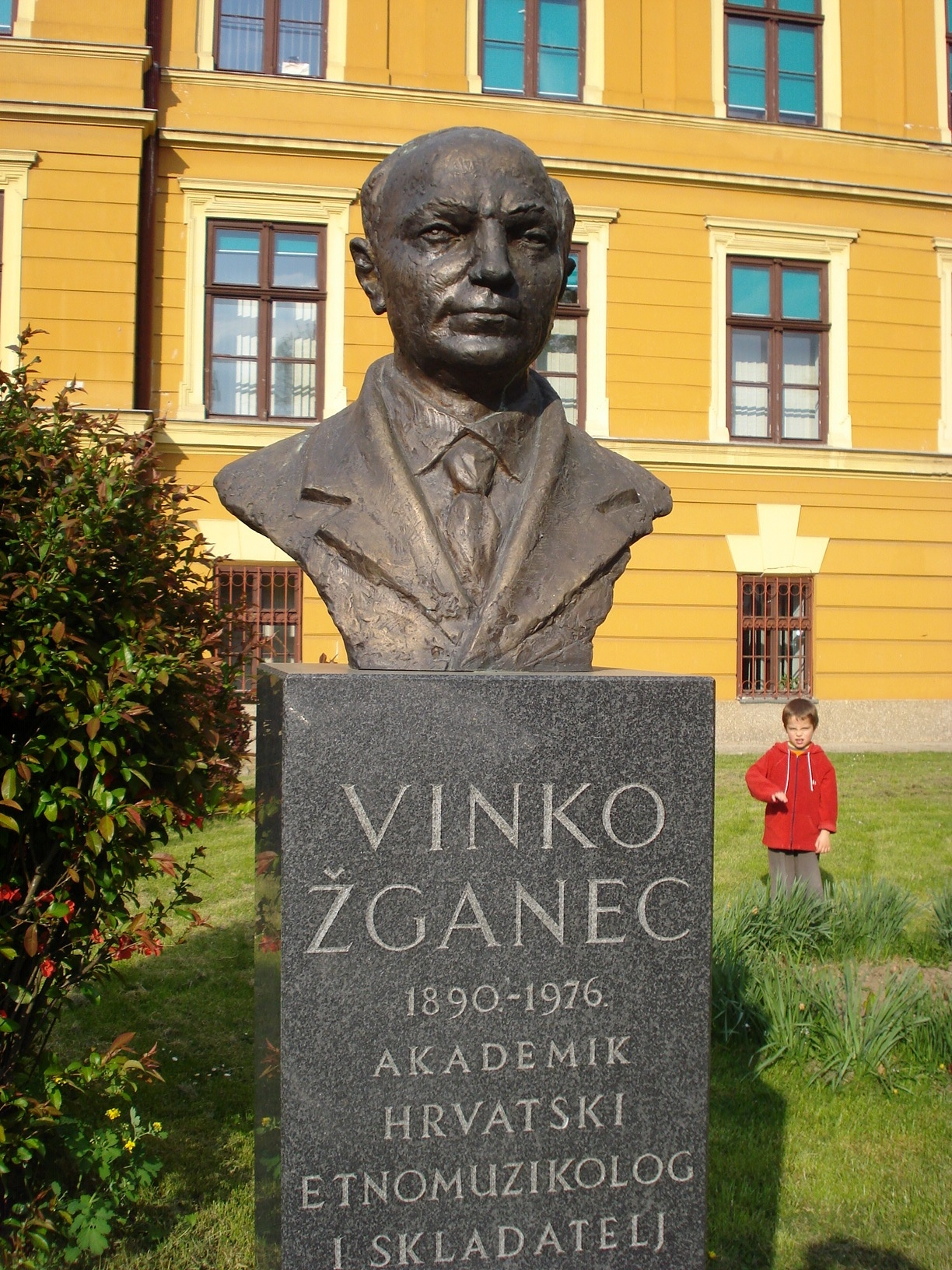
bust of Vinko Žganec in Čakovec

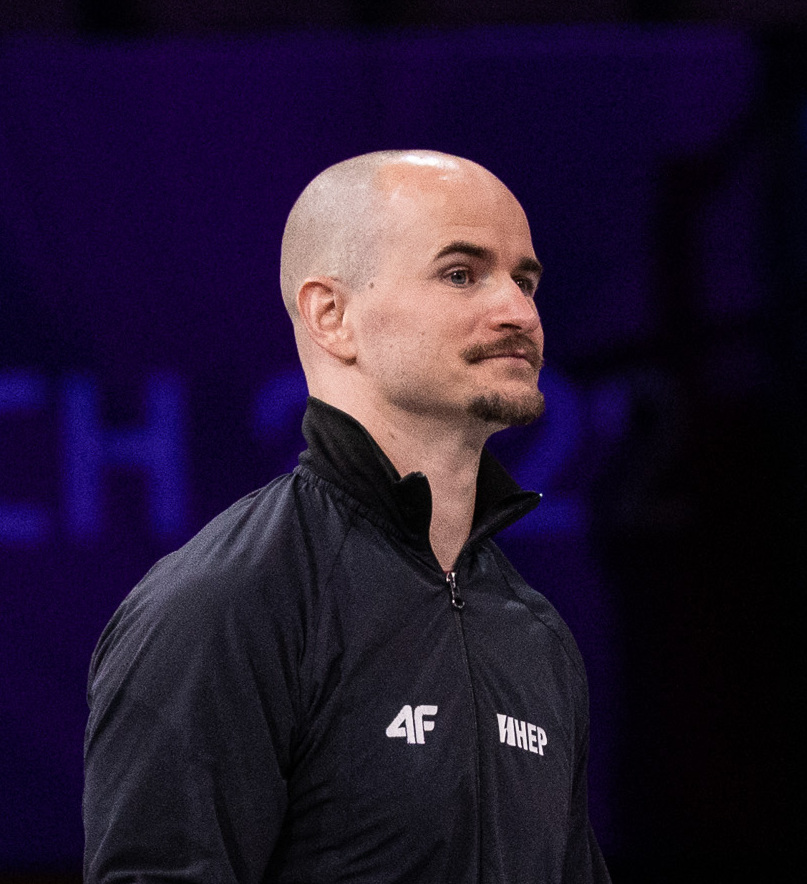
Filip Ude

This list contains some of the notable people who were either born in Čakovec, lived in the city for a longer time or were in some significant way related to it.

- Lidija Bajuk (born 1965) a Croatian singer-songwriter and poet.
- Lujo Bezeredi (1898–1979) a Croatian-Hungarian sculptor and painter.
- Stanka Gjurić (born 1956) a Croatian poet, essayist, actress and filmmaker.
- Sunčana Glavak (born 1968) a Croatian politician and MEP
- Barbara Kolar (born 1970) a Croatian actress and TV presenter
- Ladislav Kralj-Međimurec (1891–1976) a Croatian painter and engraver.
- Josip Horvat Međimurec (1904–1945), a Croatian painter.
- Josip Movčan (1924–2016) a Croatian forester with the Plitvice Lakes National Park.
- Rudolf Steiner (1861–1925) an Austrian occultist, social reformer, architect and claimed clairvoyant.
- Josip Štolcer-Slavenski (1896– 1955) a Croatian composer and Music professor
- Sandor Teszler (1903–2000), industrialist and philanthropist in the US
- Vinko Žganec (1890-1976) a Croatian ethnomusicologist and folklorist
- Juraj IV Zrinski (1549–1603), soldier, politician and patron
- Juraj V Zrinski (1599–1626), soldier and politician
- Nikola IV Zrinski (c. 1508–1566), soldier and politician.
- Nikola VII Zrinski (1620–1664), soldier, poet and philosopher.
- Petar Zrinski (1621–1671), soldier, politician and poet

=== Sport ===
- Srećko Bogdan (born 1957), Croatian former footballer with 507 club caps
- Branko Ivanković (born 1954), footballer with 269 club caps and manager in Iranian Pro League
- Robert Jarni (born 1968), footballer with 391 club caps and manager
- Dino Kresinger (born 1982), footballer with over 320 club caps
- Dražen Ladić (born 1963), football goalkeeper with 420 club caps and 59 for Croatia
- Ladislav Legenstein (born 1926) an Austrian tennis player and a Wimbledon doubles semifinalist
- Ivana Lisjak (born 1987), retired tennis player
- Nikola Pokrivač (1985–2025), footballer
- Franjo Punčec (1913–1985), Yugoslav tennis player
- Filip Ude (born 1986), pommel horse gymnast; silver medallist at the 2008 Summer Olympics
- Dario Vizinger (born 1998), footballer with almost 200 club caps

== Notes and references ==
Notes
