= Štefanec, Međimurje County =

Štefanec
- Village
- Location within Croatia
- Coordinates: 46°22′05″N 16°29′46″E
- Country: Croatia
- County: Međimurje County
- Municipality: Čakovec

Area
  - Total: 4.8 km^{2} (1.9 sq mi)

Population (2021)
  - Total: 684
  - Density: 140/km^{2} (370/sq mi)
- Time zone: UTC+1 (CET)
  - Summer (DST): UTC+2 (CEST)
- Postal code: 40000 Čakovec
- Area code: 040

Štefanec (Hungarian: Drávaszentistván) is a village in Međimurje County, Croatia.

The village is administratively part of the wider area of Čakovec, the county seat and largest city of Međimurje County. It is located around 5 kilometres from the centre of the city. Situated between Čakovec and Štefanec is Ivanovec. The population of Štefanec in the 2011 census was 716.

The D3 state road goes through the village. The western terminus of the D20 state road is also located nearby, and the D20 can be accessed by leaving the D3 just before entering Štefanec from the direction of Čakovec.

== History ==
The village was first mentioned in 1366 as Stephanouch. In 1478, Steffanecz was mentioned as one of the villages belonging to the Čakovec area.

In the 1857 census, the villages of Štefanec Mali and Štefanec Veliki (Hungarian: Kis Stefanecz and Nagy Stefanecz) were mentioned. Together, they had a population of 280. The two villages became a single village until the next census, which took place in 1869. The population grew to over 400 by the end of the 19th century.

In the 1910 census, the village had a population of 532. At the time, it was already predominantly populated by Croats. It belonged to the Prelog district (Hungarian: Perlaki járás) of Zala County in the Kingdom of Hungary, before becoming part of the Kingdom of Yugoslavia in 1920, after the Treaty of Trianon was signed. In the 1921 census, the population of the village was 602.

Between 1941 and 1945, it belonged to Hungary again, as the entire Međimurje region was annexed by the Hungarians at the time. After World War II, it became part of Croatia within the Federal People's Republic of Yugoslavia. In the censuses between 1948 and 2001, the lowest population was recorded in 2001 (753), and the highest in 1991 (807).
