= Henrik Böhm =

Hungarian architect (1867–1936)

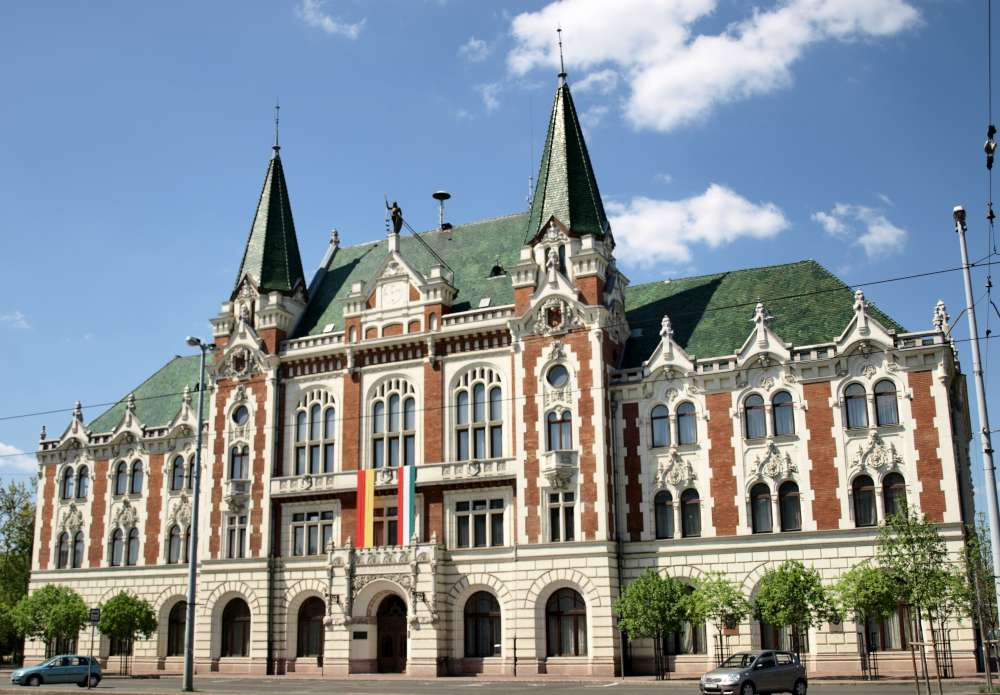
- Újpest Town Hall, designed by Böhm and Ármin Hegedűs
- Born: 10 April 1867; Várpalota, Kingdom of Hungary
- Died: 23 October 1936 (aged 69); Budapest, Kingdom of Hungary
- Education: Budapest University of Technology
- Occupation: Architect
- Practice: Böhm and Hegedűs (1898–1936)
- Buildings: Török Bank, Budapest; Újpest Town Hall; Thermia Palace, Piešťany; Trade Casino, Čakovec

Henrik Böhm (10 April 1867 – 23 October 1936) was a Hungarian Jewish architect who worked primarily in the Secessionist style. In partnership with Ármin Hegedűs, he designed numerous public buildings, banks, spas, and hotels throughout Austria-Hungary and its successor states, including the Török Bank in Budapest, the Újpest Town Hall, and the Thermia Palace in Piešťany.

== Early life and education ==
Böhm was born in Várpalota in the Kingdom of Hungary. After attending schools in Székesfehérvár and Budapest, he earned a degree in architecture from the Budapest University of Technology in 1890. Following his graduation, he undertook a lengthy study tour through Austria, the Netherlands, Sweden, Denmark, and Germany before settling in Budapest.

== Career ==
=== Partnership with Ármin Hegedűs ===
In 1898, Böhm established a joint design office with fellow architect Ármin Hegedűs (1869–1945), who had graduated from the Budapest University of Technology in 1892. This partnership proved highly productive and lasted until Böhm's death in 1936. Together, they designed some of the most notable Secessionist buildings in Budapest and beyond, as well as works in eclectic and historicizing styles.

=== Major works ===
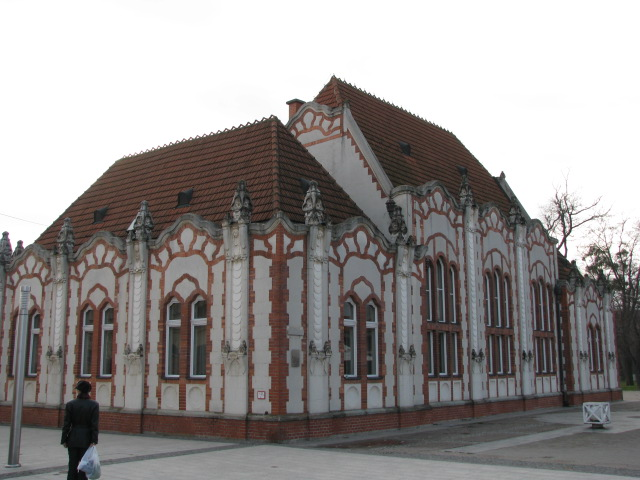
Trade Casino, Čakovec (1903)

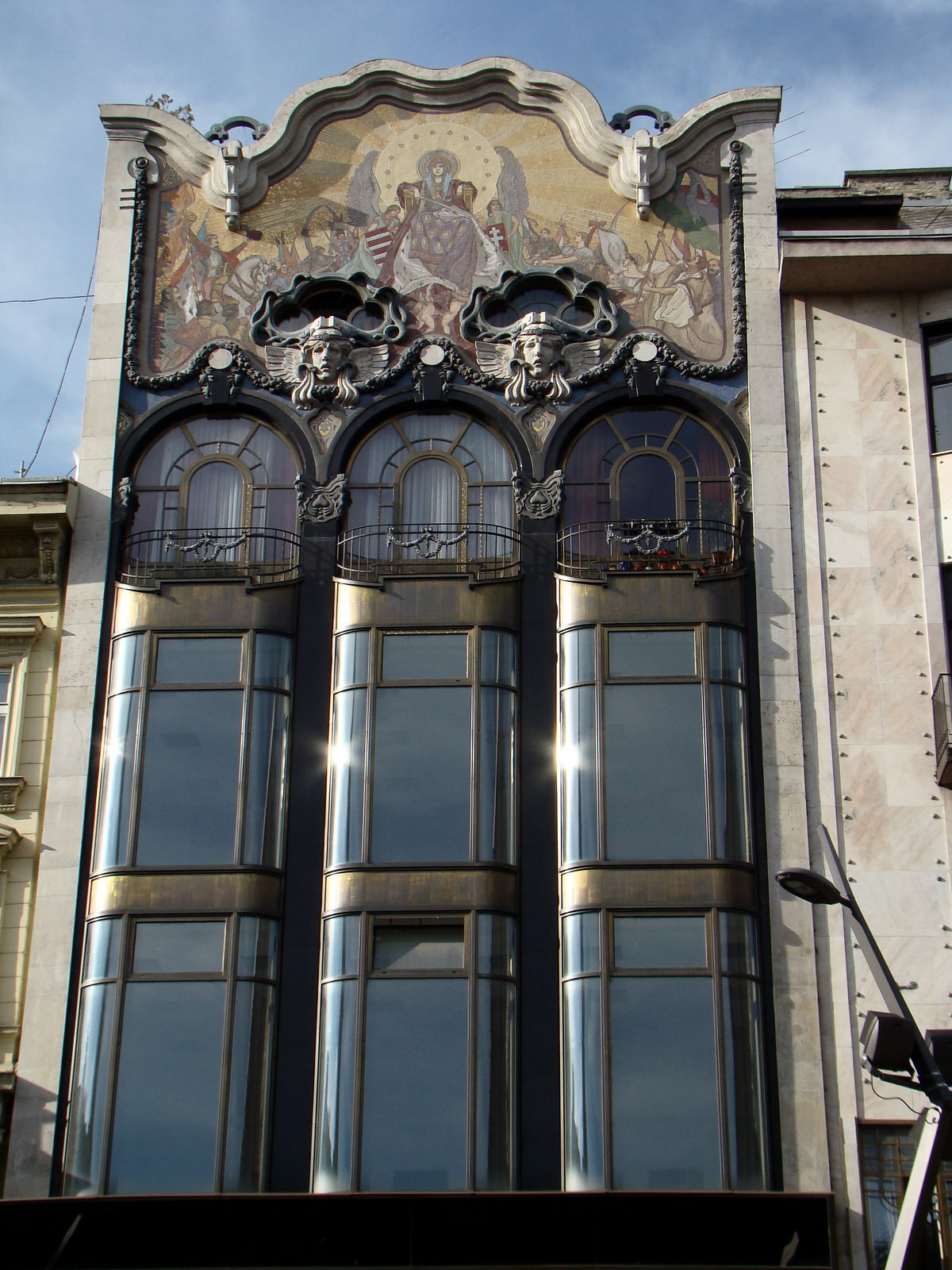
Facade of the Török Bank with Miksa Róth's mosaic

==== Újpest Town Hall (1898–1900) ====
One of the earliest major commissions for Böhm and Hegedűs was the new town hall for Újpest, which was experiencing rapid growth in the late 19th century. The architects won the design competition in 1898, submitting their entry under the pseudonym "After a Century of History". Construction began on 13 May 1899 under contractor Gyula Schreiber, who employed only workers from Újpest. The two-storey building, combining eclectic and Secessionist elements, was inaugurated on 21 August 1900. The roof features an armoured knight (Roland) holding a shield and spear.

==== Török Bank (1905–1906) ====
The Török Bank (Turkish Bank House) at Szervita tér in Budapest is considered a landmark of Hungarian Secessionism. The building, constructed for the financial institution that organised class lotteries, features an innovative steel-supported glass facade that was extremely modern for its time. The upper gable is dominated by a monumental Secessionist mosaic by Miksa Róth entitled Glory to Hungary (Patrona Hungariae), which depicts Hungary as a woman surrounded by great figures of Hungarian history, including Francis II Rákóczi, Count István Széchenyi, and Lajos Kossuth. The facade also features distinctive mascaron decorations including Medusa heads with serpentine hair.

==== Trade Casino, Čakovec (1903) ====
The Trade Casino (Trgovački kasino) in Čakovec, Croatia (then part of the Kingdom of Hungary), was built in 1903 in the Hungarian Secessionist style. Commissioned by local attorney Rudolf Wollak and constructed by Valent Morandini Jr., the building served as a gathering place for the wealthy merchant class, featuring card rooms, a gaming room, reading room, and dance hall. The single-storey building has a distinctive appearance, with exposed brick bands against white plastered walls and an undulating cornice along the main facade. After 1945, it became known as the Trade Union Hall (Dom sindikata).

==== Spa buildings ====
Böhm and Hegedűs developed particular expertise in spa and hotel architecture. Their most significant work in this field was the Thermia Palace hotel and the adjacent Irma Health Spa in Piešťany, Slovakia (then in the Kingdom of Hungary), which opened in 1912. The Art Nouveau complex, built for entrepreneur Ľudovít Winter, quickly became one of the most luxurious spa hotels in Central Europe, attracting notable guests including Bulgarian Tsar Ferdinand, Swedish Nobel laureate Selma Lagerlöf, and Czech artist Alphonse Mucha, who donated a painting to the hotel in gratitude for his daughter's recovery.

They also designed thermal bath buildings in Szolnok, Hungary, and additional spa facilities in Piešťany including the Pro Patria bath hospital and the Alexander sanatorium. A spa building they designed in Daruvar featured Oriental architectural elements.

==== Funerary architecture ====
Böhm and Hegedűs also contributed to Budapest's funerary architecture. In 1899–1900, they designed the arcade row of the Farkasréti Cemetery on the Érdi út side, featuring crypts along a monumental arcade structure. Böhm also designed several tombs in the Rákoskeresztúr Jewish cemetery.

==== Later works ====
In the 1920s and 1930s, Böhm and Hegedűs continued to work in styles ranging from late Secessionism to eclecticism and eventually modernism. In 1931, they contributed to the Napraforgó Street development in Budapest's Pasarét district, an experimental modernist housing project inspired by the Weissenhof Estate in Stuttgart. Their design for house No. 16 was built as part of this Bauhaus-influenced ensemble.

Other works by the partnership included the Pesterzsébet Town Hall, a slaughterhouse (Vágóhíd) in Újpest, a residential building at Horváth Mihály Square in Józsefváros, and the Újpestvidéki Takarékpénztár (savings bank) in Újpest.

== Death and legacy ==
Böhm died on 23 October 1936 in Budapest. His partnership with Hegedűs produced a significant body of work that contributed to the development of Hungarian Secessionist architecture. The Török Bank building remains one of the most photographed examples of Art Nouveau in Budapest, while the Thermia Palace continues to operate as a luxury spa hotel, having been restored to preserve its original Art Nouveau character.

== Selected works ==
- Újpest Town Hall, Budapest (1898–1900), with Ármin Hegedűs
- Farkasrét Cemetery arcade row, Budapest (1899–1900), with Hegedűs
- Trade Casino, Čakovec, Croatia (1903), with Hegedűs
- Török Bank, Budapest (1905–1906), with Hegedűs
- Thermia Palace and Irma Health Spa, Piešťany, Slovakia (1912), with Hegedűs
- Napraforgó Street No. 16, Budapest (1931), with Hegedűs
