= Novo Selo na Dravi =

- Village
- Location within Croatia
- Coordinates: 46°19′52″N 16°25′59″E
- Country: Croatia
- County: Međimurje County
- Municipality: Čakovec

Area
  - Total: 1.4 km^{2} (0.54 sq mi)

Population (2021)
  - Total: 557
  - Density: 400/km^{2} (1,000/sq mi)
- Time zone: UTC+1 (CET)
  - Summer (DST): UTC+2 (CEST)
- Postal code: 40000 Čakovec
- Area code: 040

Novo Selo na Dravi (Croatian pronunciation: [nôʋoː sělo na drâːʋi]; Hungarian: Drávaújfalu) is a village in Međimurje County, Croatia.

The village is located in the south-western part of Međimurje County, near Lake Varaždin, and is administratively part of the wider area of the county seat, Čakovec. It is located around 8 kilometres from the centre of the city. Novo Selo na Dravi is connected with the village of Totovec, while other nearby villages include Šandorovec and Kuršanec. The centre of Varaždin, the county seat of Varaždin County, is located around 10 kilometres from Novo Selo na Dravi. The population of the village in the 2011 census was 634. The etymology of the village comes from Slavic languages meaning new village, Novo Selo.

The village was known as Novo Selo until the 1948 census. In the 1857 census, it had a population of 217. By the 1900s, it was predominantly populated by Croats. In the 1910 census, it was considered part of the wider area of Varaždin. Between 1941 and 1945, it was part of Hungary, which annexed the entire Međimurje region at the time. The current name was first mentioned as the official name of the village in the 1953 census, presumably to differentiate it from Novo Selo Rok. Since the 1950s, the population of the village was constantly around 600.
