= Ivanovec =

- Village
- Location within Croatia
- Coordinates: 46°22′05″N 16°28′37″E
- Country: Croatia
- County: Međimurje County
- Municipality: Čakovec

Area
  - Total: 9.4 km^{2} (3.6 sq mi)

Population (2021)
  - Total: 1,922
  - Density: 200/km^{2} (530/sq mi)
- Time zone: UTC+1 (CET)
  - Summer (DST): UTC+2 (CEST)
- Postal code: 40000 Čakovec
- Area code: 040

Ivanovec (Hungarian: Drávaszentiván) is a village in Međimurje County, Croatia. It had a population of 2,093 in the 2011 census.

The village is administratively part of the wider area of Čakovec, the county seat and largest city of Međimurje County. It is located next to the city's south-eastern end, approximately three kilometres from its centre. Also nearby is the village of Štefanec. In 1991, the nearby village of Gornji Vidovec was annexed to become part of Ivanovec.
