= Totovec =

- Village
- Location within Croatia
- Coordinates: 46°20′24″N 16°26′31″E
- Country: Croatia
- County: Međimurje County
- Municipality: Čakovec

Area
  - Total: 5.5 km^{2} (2.1 sq mi)

Population (2021)
  - Total: 491
  - Density: 89/km^{2} (230/sq mi)
- Time zone: UTC+1 (CET)
  - Summer (DST): UTC+2 (CEST)
- Postal code: 40000 Čakovec
- Area code: 040

Totovec (Hungarian: Tótfalu) is a village in Međimurje County, Croatia. It had a population of 534 in the 2011 census.

The village is located around 7 kilometres south of the centre of Čakovec, the county seat and largest city of Međimurje County, and is administratively part of the city's wider area. It is also close to Lake Varaždin, a reservoir on the Drava, and is connected with the village of Novo Selo na Dravi.

A gravel pit located in the village, called Totomore, is also a popular summer bathing and entertainment destination in Međimurje County.
