= Knežević =

Knežević (Serbian: Кнежевић) is a Serbian, Croatian, Montenegrin and Bosnian surname, derived from the title of knez. It may refer to:

- House of Knežević, Croatian noble family

Knežević is the eighth most frequent surname in Croatia.

The anglicized version of this name, are Knezevich, Knezevic, or Knesevich as typically seen in the United States. The Polish variant is Kniaziewicz.

== Geographical distribution ==
As of 2014, 45.4% of all known bearers of the surname Knežević were residents of Serbia (frequency 1:385), 23.6% of Bosnia and Herzegovina (1:367), 21.6% of Croatia (1:479) and 8.8% of Montenegro (1:174).

In Serbia, the frequency of the surname was higher than average (1:385) in the following districts:

1. Srem District (1:192)
2. Zlatibor District (1:221)
3. South Bačka District (1:223)
4. West Bačka District (1:233)
5. Central Banat District (1:252)
6. Rasina District (1:261)
7. Belgrade (1:294)
8. North Banat District (1:298)
9. Mačva District (1:306)
10. South Banat District (1:350)

In Bosnia and Herzegovina, the frequency of the surname was higher than average (1:367) only in Republika Srpska (1:262).

In Croatia, the frequency of the surname was higher than average (1:479) in the following counties:

1. Zadar County (1:172)
2. Virovitica-Podravina County (1:188)
3. Šibenik-Knin County (1:201)
4. Brod-Posavina County (1:234)
5. Požega-Slavonia County (1:252)
6. Vukovar-Srijem County (1:259)
7. Osijek-Baranja County (1:294)
8. Lika-Senj County (1:324)
9. Primorje-Gorski Kotar County (1:389)
10. Sisak-Moslavina County (1:425)
11. Bjelovar-Bilogora County (1:469)

== Notable people ==
- Dario Knežević, Croatian footballer
- Duško Knežević, Montenegrin businessman
- Goran Knežević, Serbian politician, former mayor of Zrenjanin
- Ivan Knežević, Montenegrin footballer
- Ivana Knežević, Miss Montenegro 2006
- Josip Knežević, Croatian footballer
- Nenad Knežević "Knez", Montenegrin singer
- Ksenija Knežević, Serbian-Montenegrin singer
- Milan Knežević, Montenegrin Serb politician
- Milan Knežević, Serbian politician
- Milena Knežević, Montenegrin handballer
- Milorad Knežević, Serbian chess grandmaster
- Miodrag Knežević, Yugoslav and Serbian footballer
- Nikola Knežević, Serbian footballer
- Nikolina Knežević (handballer)
- Nikolina Knežević (basketball)
- Srđa Knežević, Serbian footballer
- Stevan Knežević, Serbian painter and sculptor
- Stevan Knežević, graphic designer
- Uroš Knežević, Serbian painter
- Vinko Knežević (1755–1832), Austrian general of the Napoleonic Wars
- Zlatko M. Knežević, Judge of the Constitutional Court of Bosnia and Herzegovina
- Zoran Knežević, several people
