= House of Knežević =

Croatian noble family

House of Knežević Kneževići od Svete Jelene Knezhevich of St. Helen
- Croatian noble family
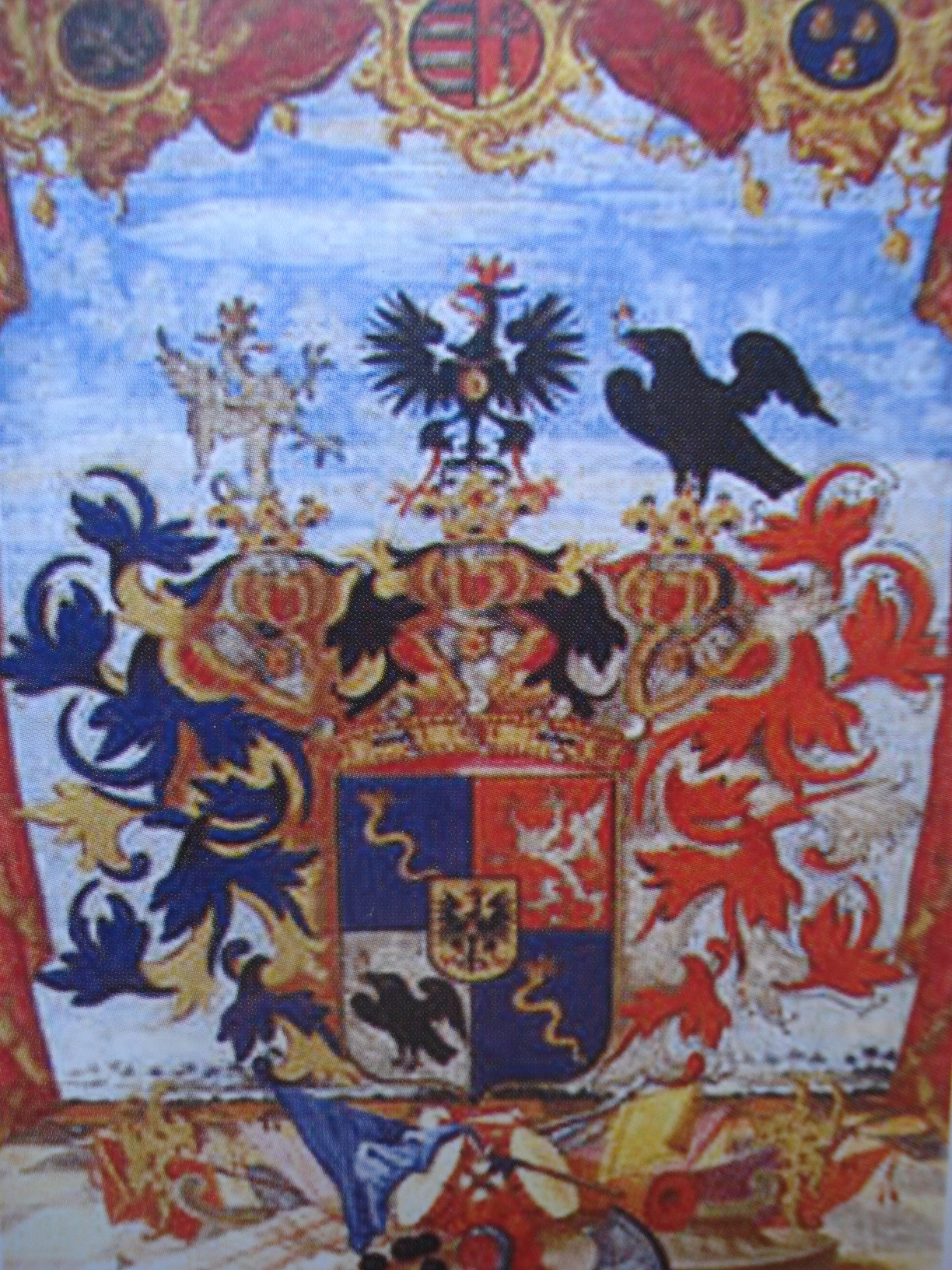
- Family coat of arms
- Country: Kingdom of Croatia in personal union with Hungary, Kingdom of Croatia in Habsburg Monarchy
- Founded: 15th century
- Founder: Filip Knežević (?)
- Current head: extinct
- Final ruler: Ivo Knežević
- Titles: baron (since 1763)
- Estates: Sveta Jelena, Gračac, Grab (in Lika), Mačkovec, Knezovec, Zasadbreg, Štrigova and Leskovec
- Dissolution: 1924

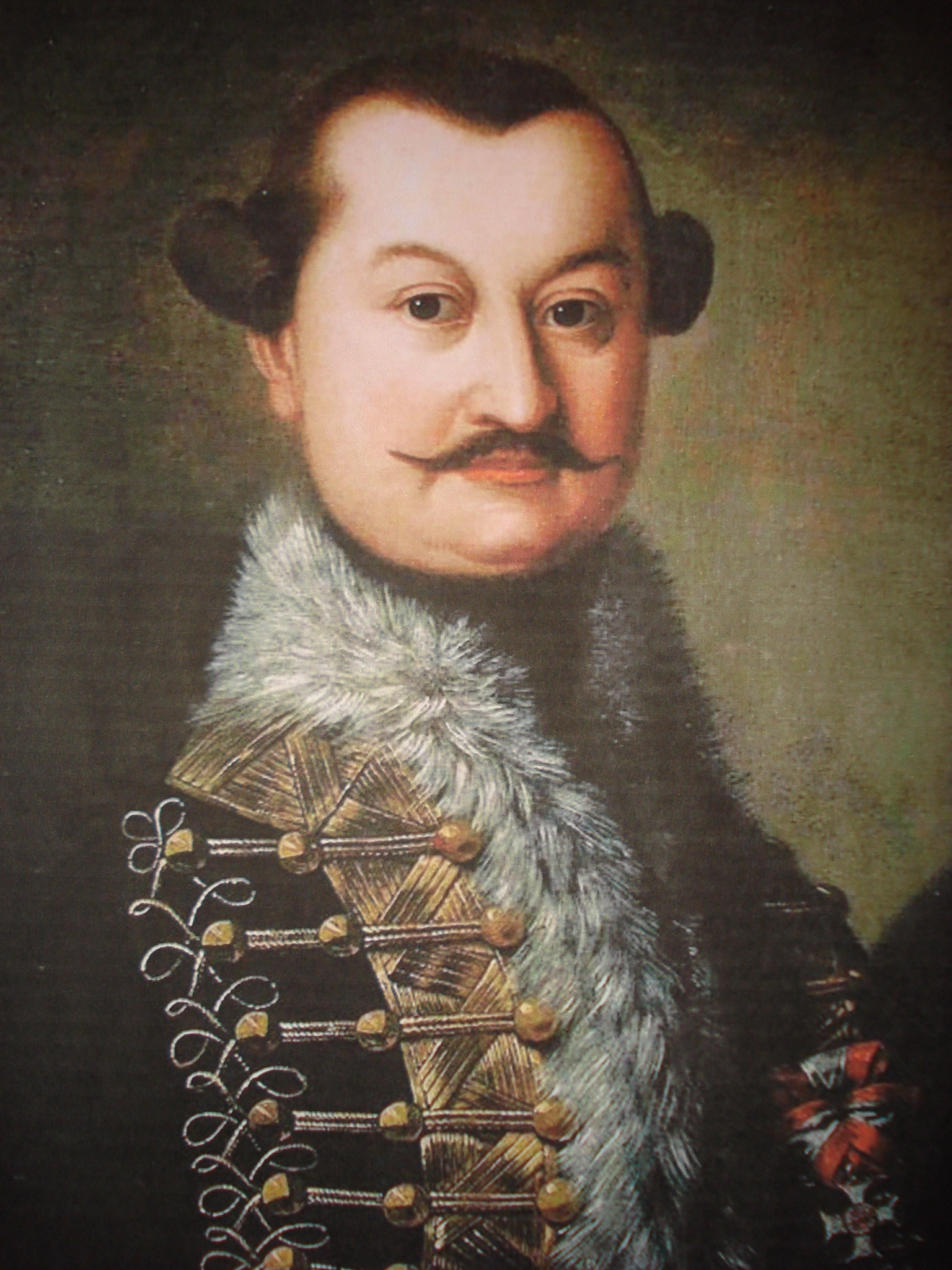
Martin baron Knežević (*1708–†1781), major-general of the Habsburg monarchy army

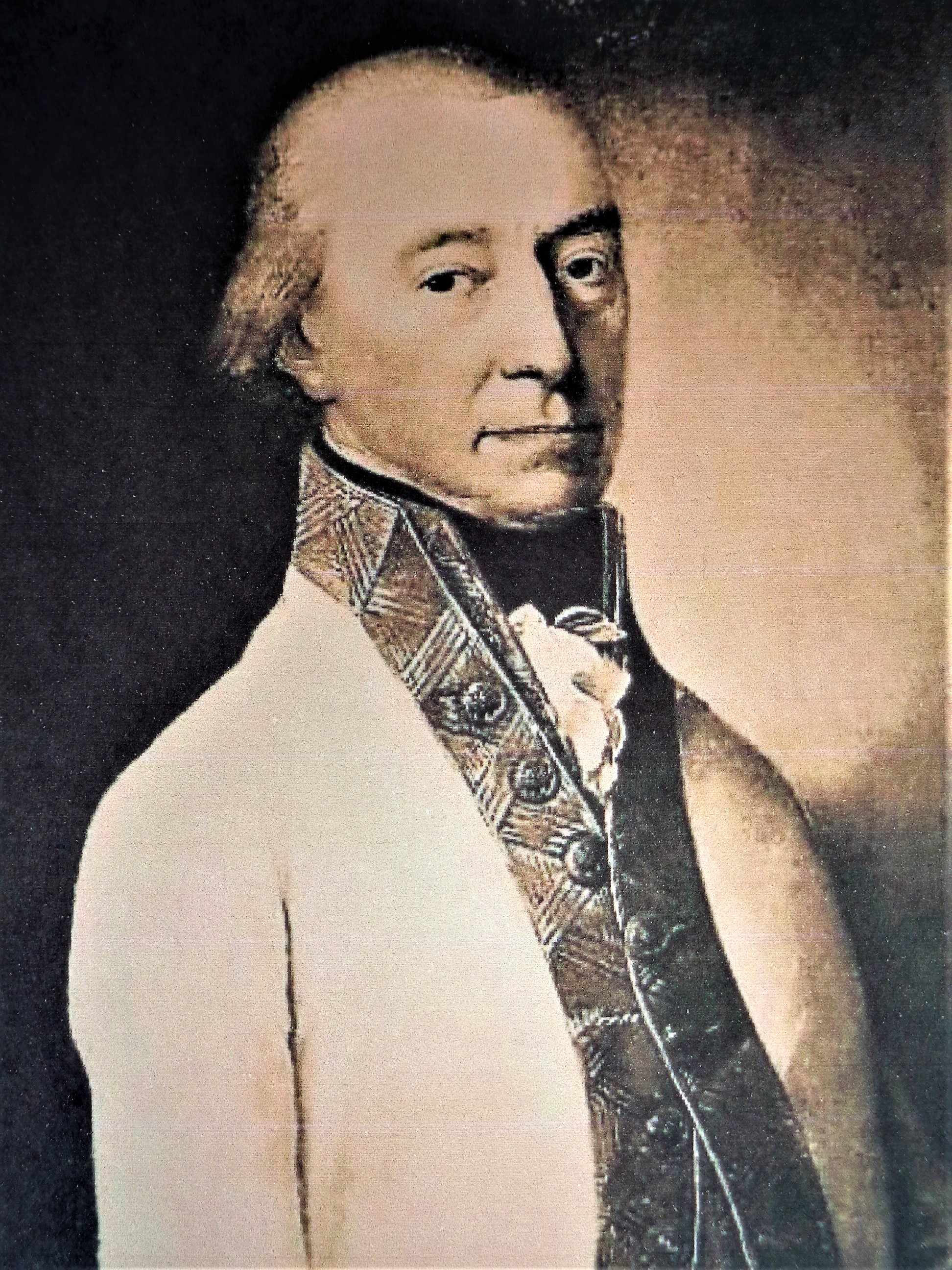
Juraj baron Knežević (*1733-†1805), major-general, Martin's eldest son

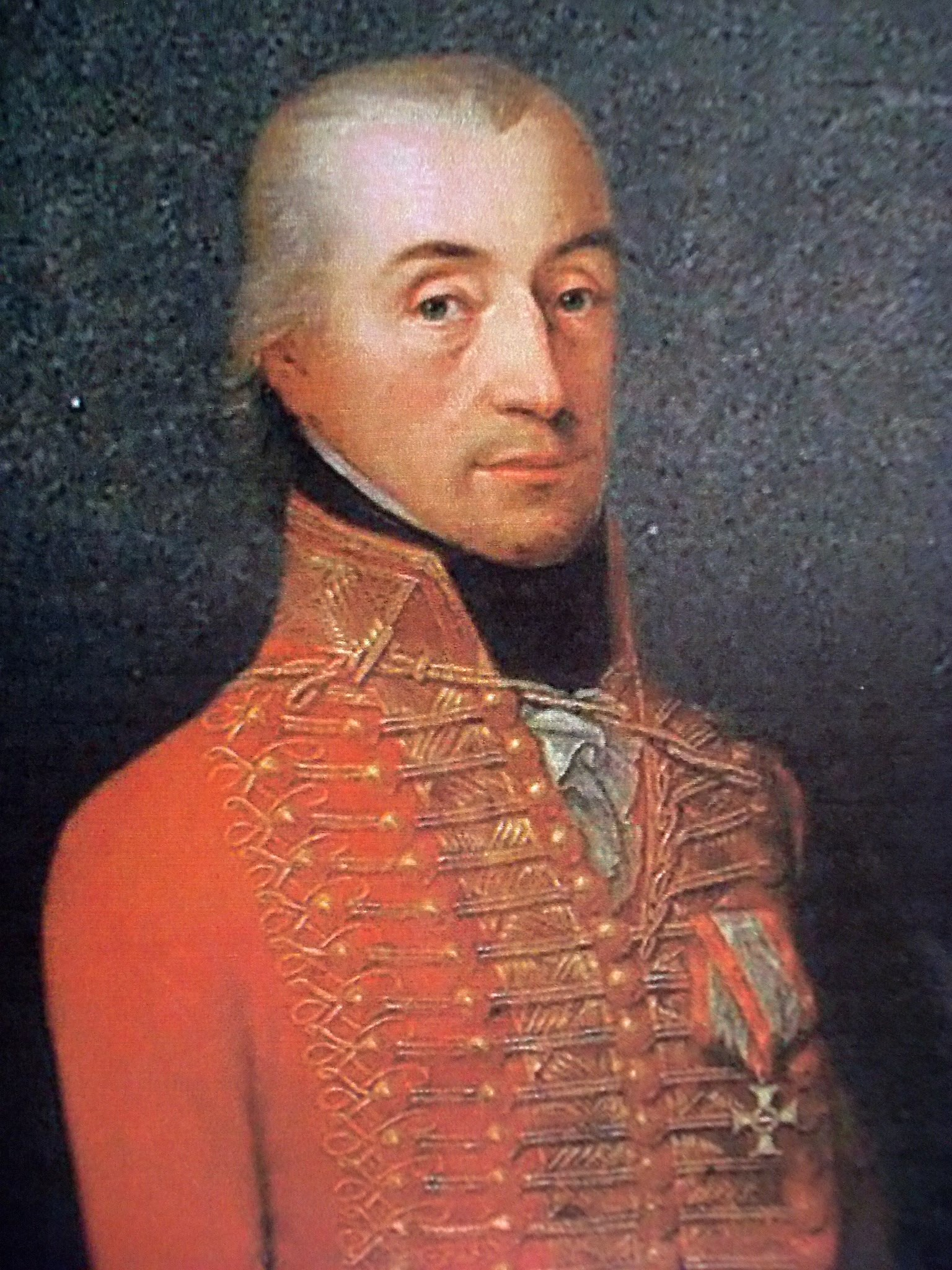
Vinko baron Knežević (*1755–†1832), General of the cavalry, Martin's youngest son

The House of Knežević (pronounced [kněːʒeʋitɕ]; German: Knesevich, also von Szent-Helena) was a Croatian noble family. First mentioned in Herzegovina in the 15th century, family moved in the second half of the century towards northwest, where the members of the family gained new estates from the king Matthias Corvinus in Lika. During the following centuries, they were appointed to various military and other services in the Habsburg monarchy army. At the beginning of the 19th century, some of the distinguished family members, being notable high-ranking army officers, moved to Međimurje where they acquired new possessions. The last of them, Ivo Knežević, died in 1924 without leaving a successor.

== Family history ==
The family was descended from the medieval village of Broćno (Brotnjo) at Čitluk.

Like many of old Croatian noble families from the southeastern part of the medieval Croatian Kingdom and other nearby states or territories (Kingdom of Bosnia, Zachlumia, Travunia), the Kneževićs were forced, following the increasing Ottoman threat and territorial expansion, to withdraw and abandon their homes and to move northwestwards.

After the medieval Kingdom of Bosnia was occupied by the Ottoman Empire in 1463, Croato-Hungarian king Matthias Corvinus confirmed the nobility status of Ivan/John Knežević, a son of Filip/Phillip Knežević, a nobleman who had fallen during the Siege of Jajce, and gave him estates in Lika (Gračac and Grab), per charter dated 2 July 1466.

Ivan Knežević's great-grandson Franjo/Francis Knežević received acknowledgement of his possessions from the king Ferdinand II of Habsburg on 15 May 1628. Franjo was commander of defence of the Krbava area (eastern Lika), but lost almost all of his possessions following the Ottoman occupation. Only when the Ottomans were expelled from Lika by the end of the 17th century and the beginning of the 18th century, Knežević family regained its old estates. At that time the head of the family was Juraj/George Knežević, major of the Croatian Military Frontier Lika Infantry Regiment of the Habsburg imperial army, who married Katarina née Stibor, a noble woman from Senj. Their son Martin (1708–1781) made further progress, being promoted to major-general on 11 February 1759. He took part in many battles and wars during his career, e. g. War of the Austrian Succession (1740–1748) and Seven Years' War (1756–1763).

In 1762 Martin Knežević was awarded the Knight's Cross of the Military Order of Maria Theresa for his extraordinary military merits. On 7 April 1763 he was given the hereditary title of baron. His wife Uršula/Ursula née Vukasović (1717–1776) bore him a lot of children, among which were six sons:

- Juraj/George (1733–1805), major-general
- Antun/Anthony (1737–1809), lieutenant-colonel
- Ivan/John (1743–1809), major-general
- Petar/Peter (1746–1814), major-general
- Lavoslav/Leopold (died 1788/89?), captain
- Vinko/Vincent (1755–1832), General of the cavalry

In 1802 some of the Knežević brothers (Ivan, Petar and Vinko) moved to Međimurje, the northernmost part of Croatia. They bought (or exchanged for their possessions in Lika) the former estate of the Pauline monastery in Sveta Jelena, furthermore Mačkovec, Zasadbreg, Knezovec, Štrigova and Leskovec. At the same time they took the title of "Kneževićs of Sveta Jelena" (Saint Helen, Hungarian: Szent Ilona).

Only two of six brothers had children of their own, Petar and Vinko. Petar married Viktorija/Victoria née Bender and fathered Maksimilijan Ivan/Maximilian John in 1804 and Aleksandar Franjo Kazimir/Alexander Francis Casimir in 1809. In Vinko's marriage with baroness Karolina/Caroline née Hogger two sons were born as well: Aleksandar (1810) and Konstantin/Constantin (1811).

When general Vinko Knežević died in 1832, estates in Sveta Jelena were sold to the Feštetić family, who already owned the largest part of the county. Estates in Štrigova and its surroundings remained in possession of the Knežević family until 1924. It is known that Viktor/Victor Knežević, a descendant of Petar Knežević, who was retired and non-married Hussar captain, lived at his Štrigova estate in 1898.

After the World War I, two descendant remained, living in Međimurje: Aleksandar and Ivo/Johnny. The latter died in 1924, leaving a will according to which the whole collection of the family portraits were donated to the Croatian History Museum in Zagreb.

== See also ==
- List of noble families of Croatia
- Međimurje (region)
- Croatia in personal union with Hungary
- Kingdom of Croatia (Habsburg)
- History of Croatia
