= Leskovec, Croatia =

Leskovec
- Village
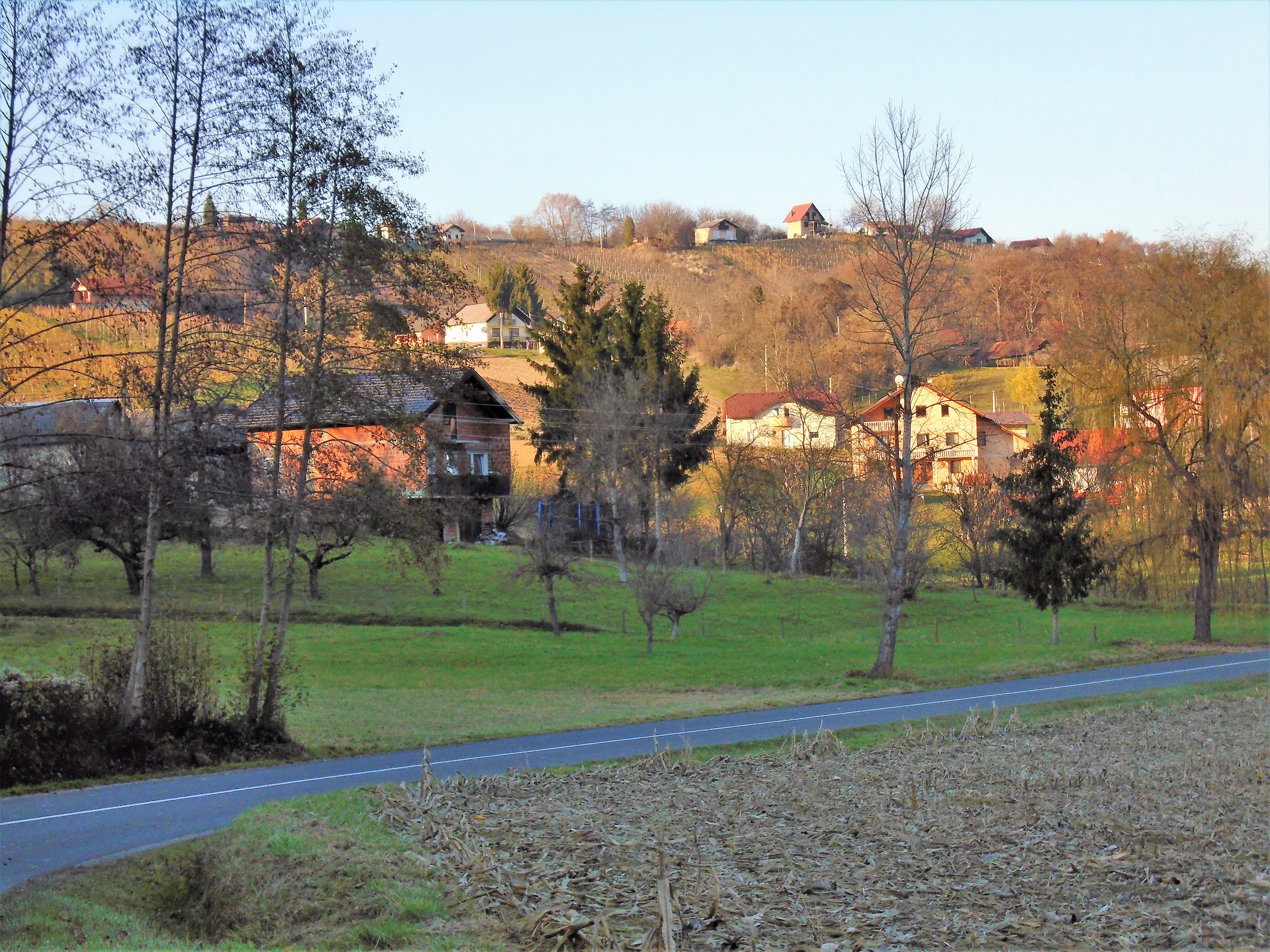

- Location within Croatia
- Coordinates: 46°29′17″N 16°16′25″E
- Country: Croatia
- County: Međimurje County
- Municipality: Štrigova

Area
  - Total: 1.2 km^{2} (0.46 sq mi)

Population (2021)
  - Total: 83
  - Density: 69/km^{2} (180/sq mi)
- Time zone: UTC+1 (CET)
  - Summer (DST): UTC+2 (CEST)
- Postal code: 40312 Štrigova

Leskovec is a village in northern Croatia, part of the Štrigova municipality within Međimurje County. Village is located near the border with Slovenia.

== History ==
Leskovec is first time mentioned in charter issued in year 1448 as Villa Leskocz. In this charter Frederick II of Celje granted the village Leskovec to the chapel of Saint Jerome in nearby Štrigova. In year 1664 chapel of Saint Jerome with Leskovec was granted to the Pauline Order from Šenkovec by count Petar Zrinski. In early 19th century Leskovec was granted to noble family Knežević.

== Geography ==
Leskovec is located in valley between hills of Gornje Međimurje, southwest from municipality centre Štrigova. Leskovec had a population of 109 in 2011 census. Leskovec is experiencing population decline since the 1950s.

Historical population

Year	Pop.	±%
1921	137	—
1931	145	+5.8%
1948	155	+6.9%
1953	147	−5.2%
1961	132	−10.2%

Year	Pop.	±%
1971	137	+3.8%
1981	n/a (Note: Leskovec was part of village Štrigova)	—
1991	n/a	—
2001	112	—
2011	109	−2.7%
