= Vinko Knežević =

Croatian nobleman and general

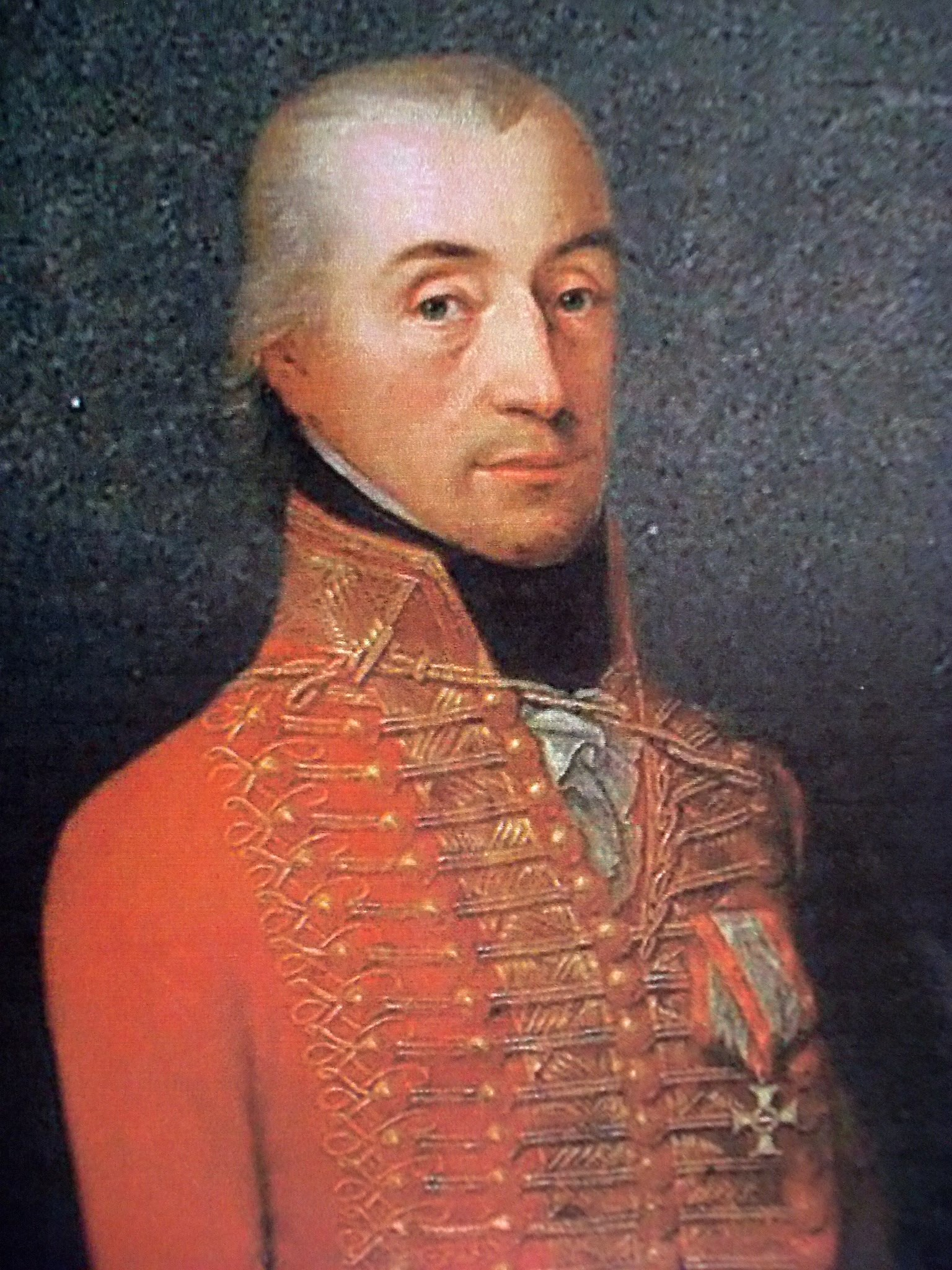
- Baron Vinko Knežević
- Born: 30 November 1755; Gračac, Lika region, Habsburg monarchy, modern-day Croatia
- Died: 11 March 1832 (aged 76); Sveta Jelena, Međimurje County, Austrian Empire, modern-day Croatia
- Military career
- Allegiance: Austrian Empire
- Branch: Cavalry
- Service years: 1772–1815
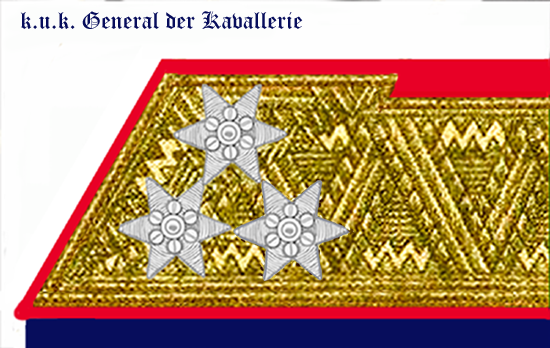
- Rank: General der Kavallerie
- Conflicts: Austro-Turkish War (1787-1791); French Revolutionary Wars; Battle of Cassano (1799); Battle of the Trebbia (1799); Battle of Novi (1799); Battle of Marengo (1800); Napoleonic Wars; Battle of Scharnitz (1805); Battle of Graz (1809)
- Awards: Knight's Cross of the Military Order of Maria Theresa, 1799
- Other work: Inhaber Dragoon Regiment Nr. 3 Chamberlain, 1808; Privy Councillor, 1823

Vinko Knežević or Vincent Knesevich of Saint Helen (Croatian: Vinko Knežević od Svete Jelene, Hungarian: Vince Knezsevics de Szent-Ilona); 30 November 1755 – 11 March 1832) was a Croatian nobleman and general in the Habsburg monarchy imperial army service. He was a member of the Knežević noble family. During his long military career he fought in many battles during the Austro-Turkish War and the French Revolutionary Wars. In 1799 he led a hussar regiment at Cassano, the Trebbia and Novi. He commanded an infantry brigade at Marengo the following year and led Austrian Empire troops in the Tyrol in 1805 and at Graz in 1809. He served in various assignments on the Military Border from 1809 to 1812. From 1802 he lived on his estate Sveta Jelena (Szent-Ilona in Hungarian, named after Empress St. Helen) in former Zala County, modern-day Međimurje County in northern Croatia. By the end of Napoleonic Wars he retired from military service as a General der Kavallerie in 1815. He became Proprietor of a dragoon regiment in 1809 and held that office until his death in 1832.

== Early life and career ==
Knežević was born on 30 November 1755 at Gračac (Lika region), in a part of Habsburg monarchy known as Croatian Military Frontier, as the youngest son of baron Martin Knežević (1708–1781), major general of the Habsburg army, and his wife Uršula Knežević née Vukasović (1717–1776). He had five brothers, who all were military officers, and two sisters.

He started his career in 1772 as cadet in the Royal Hungarian Noble Body Guard at Viennese Court. In the Austro-Turkish War (1787-1791) he recruited and led a freikorps to fight against the Ottoman Empire. Together with major Josip Filip Vukasović he distinguished himself in 1789 during the battle of Cetingrad.

In the War of the First Coalition he was major and led a squadron of hussars in western Galicia. He attained the ranks of Oberstleutnant (lieutenant colonel) in 1796 and Oberst (colonel) in 1797. In the latter year he became the commanding officer of the Archduke Joseph Palatine Cavalry Regiment Nr. 17. In 1798 the unit was redesignated Hussar Regiment Nr. 2 and stationed in Inner Austria.

In the War of the Second Coalition Knežević led his hussar regiment at the Battle of Cassano on 26 April 1799. The regiment's eight squadrons were part of Johann von Zoph's 1st Division. Near Vaprio d'Adda, the Palatine Hussars launched three attacks and finally broke through Paul Grenier's division, inflicting 200 casualties and capturing 300 French soldiers outright. Together with other Austrian and Russian units, they rounded up 2,800 prisoners and collected as trophies 12 cannons, one howitzer, six ammunition wagons, and one standard. The regiment's losses were severe, 153 killed. For this exploit, Knežević received the Knight's Cross of the Military Order of Maria Theresa on 15 May 1799. On 28 April, his regiment was part of the force that trapped Jean-Mathieu-Philibert Serurier's division and compelled it to surrender. French losses in the clash were 252 killed with eight guns and 2,700 men captured.

Knežević led his hussars with distinction at the Battle of the Trebbia on 17 to 20 June 1799. In this action, his unit was part of Friedrich Heinrich von Gottesheim's Avantgarde of the Left Column. On 19 June, the hussars helped throw back François Watrin's French division. He was also at the Battle of Novi on 15 August. In that action, the Palatine Hussars fought in Pál Kray's corps. From 16 November to 3 December, he and his hussars participated in the siege of Cuneo under the command of Johann I Joseph, Prince of Liechtenstein. At the end, the 3,000-man garrison surrendered the fortress with 187 guns and 14,000 hundredweight of gunpowder.

According to historian Digby Smith, Knežević was promoted to General-major on 29 October 1800. However, another source shows that he commanded a brigade with the rank of General-major in Konrad Valentin von Kaim's 4,939-man division at the Battle of Marengo on 14 June 1800. His command included three battalions of the Infantry Regiment Grand Duke of Tuscany Nr. 23, a total of 2.188 soldiers. During the late morning, Kaim's division repeatedly attacked the French line behind Fontanone Creek with little success. Later in the day, all three brigades of Kaim's division joined the pursuit under Anton von Zach and were involved in the rout of the main column at the end of the battle.

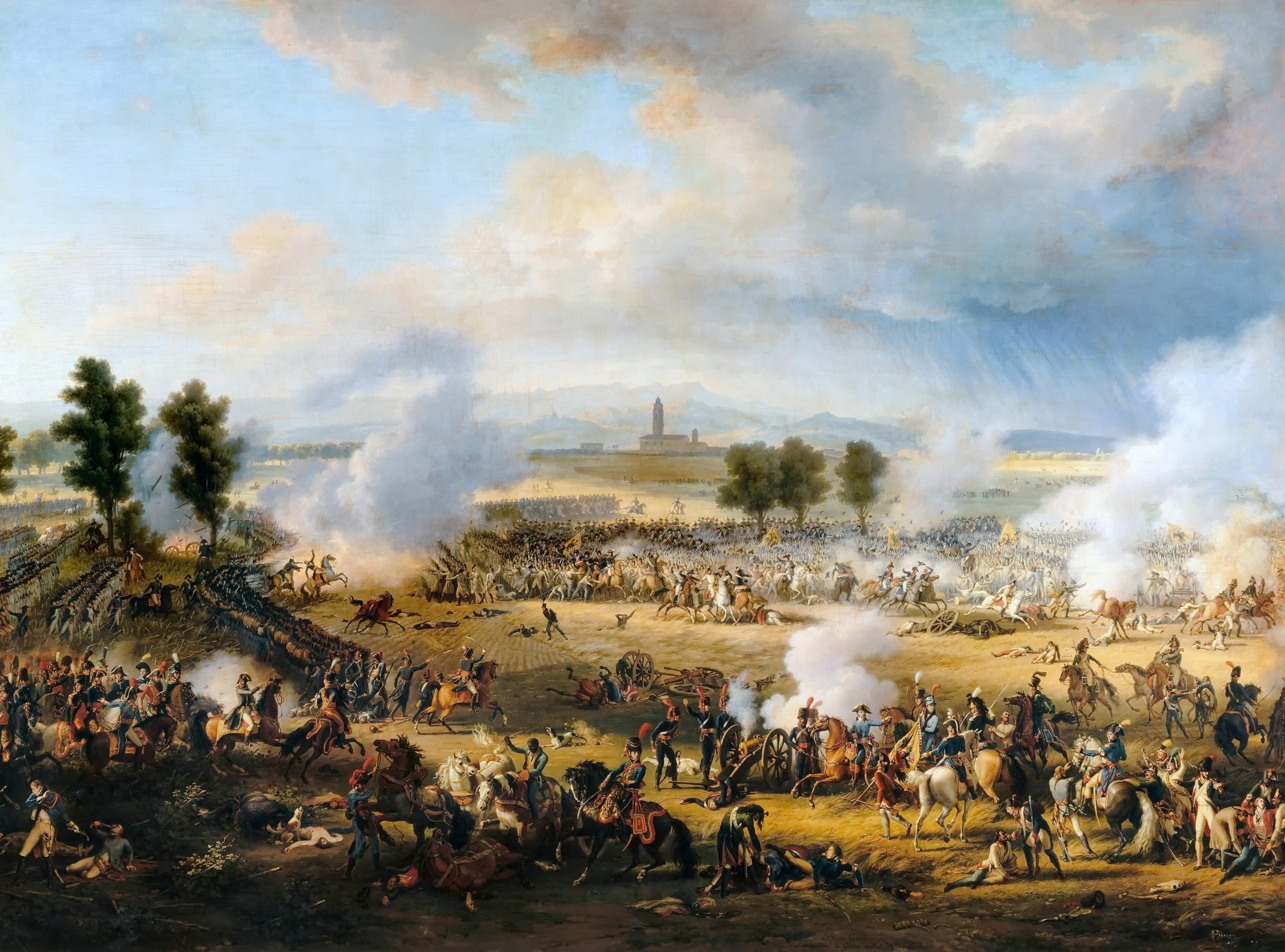
Knežević commanded a brigade at the Battle of Marengo

== Napoleonic Wars ==
During the War of the Third Coalition, Knežević led an infantry brigade in Franz Xaver Saint-Julien's division. His brigade fought in actions at the Strub Pass on 2–3 November 1805 and at Scharnitz and Leutasch on 4 November. At Strub Pass, the Austrians defeated Bavarians under Bernhard Erasmus von Deroy and at Sharnitz repulsed French VI Corps troops. In both actions the Austrians lost few men while inflicting heavy losses. However, at Leutasch, the French wiped out 936 Austrians, enabling Marshal Michel Ney's troops to occupy Innsbruck.

Knežević was named Chamberlain on 7 January 1808 and elevated in rank to Feldmarschall-Leutnant on 14 August 1808. He was appointed Proprietor of the Dragoon Regiment Nr. 3 on 14 April 1809 and would retain this dignity until his death. The former proprietor was Frederick I of Württemberg. He was named deputy commander of the Banal Military Border from February to November 1809.

Knežević was given command of the 3rd Division in Ignaz Gyulai's IX Armeekorps at the outbreak of the War of the Fifth Coalition. His division consisted of Andreas Stoichevich's brigade of eight Grenz infantry battalions, two garrison battalions, and eight 3-pound cannons. However, the corps structure was immediately changed so that 10,000 troops under Johann Gabriel Chasteler de Courcelles could be sent to support the Tyrolean Rebellion. Meanwhile, Stoichevich was detached to fight against Auguste de Marmont in the Dalmatian Campaign. Knežević fought at the Battle of Graz on 24–26 June 1809.

From October 1810 to April 1812 Knežević served as commander of the Varaždin generalate of the Military Frontier. He was elected the Vizekapitän of Dalmatia, Croatia and Slavonia in 1813. He led the Reservekorps of the Army of Italy in April and May 1815. When he retired on 22 September 1815 he was promoted to General der Kavallerie. He was named Privy Councillor in 1823.

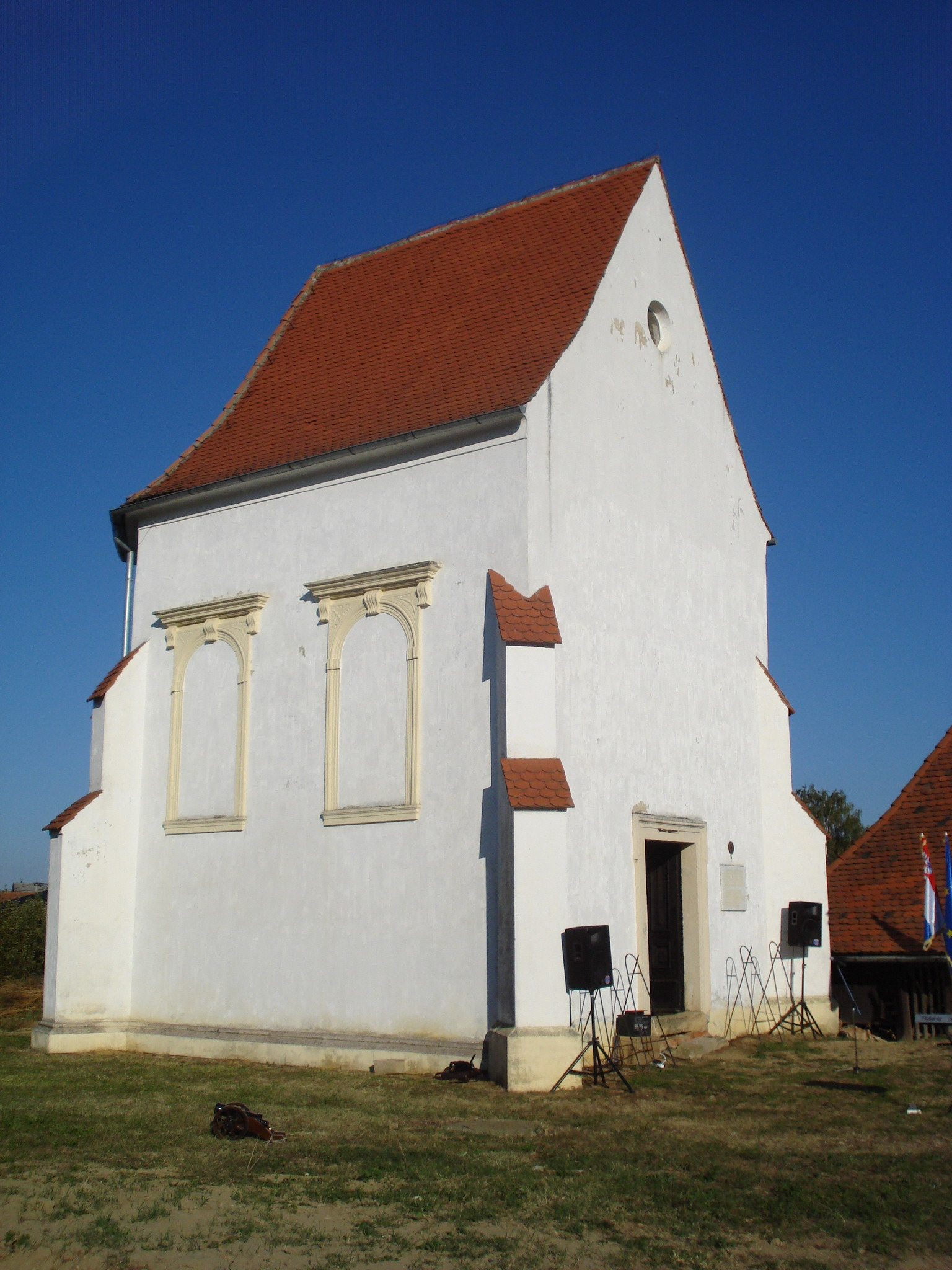
The chapel of St. Helen (Sveta Jelena) near the Knežević's burial place

== Family ==
In 1793 Knežević married baroness Karoline Högger von Bernlach und Weisenburg. They had two sons, Aleksandar (born 1810) and Konstantin (born 1811). Three older brothers also became Austrian generals. These were Juraj /Georg Anton/ (1733–1805), Ivan /Johann Karl/ (1743–1809) and Petar /Peter Vinzenz/ (1746–1814). Knežević died in Sveta Jelena on 11 March 1832. Baron Minutillo succeeded him as proprietor of Dragoon Regiment Nr. 3.

== See also ==
- House of Knežević
- List of Military Order of Maria Theresa recipients of Croatian descent
- List of Croatian soldiers
- Croatian nobility

== Notes ==
Military offices
Preceded by Frederick I of Württemberg	Proprietor (Inhaber) of Dragoon Regiment Nr. 3; 1809–1832	Succeeded by Friedrich von Minutillo
