= Zoran Knežević =

Zoran Knežević may refer to:

- Zoran Knežević (astronomer) (born 1949), Serbian astronomer
- Zoran Knežević (footballer) (born 1986), Serbian footballer
- Zoran Knežević (politician) (1948–2014), Serbian politician
