= Stevan Knežević =

Stevan Knežević (Serbian Cyrillic: Стеван Кнежевић; 1940–1995) was a Serbian painter, sculptor, printmaker and performance artist. He was a professor at the Faculty of Fine Arts in Belgrade.

Stevan Knežević was born in Belgrade in 1940. He graduated at the Academy of Fine Arts in Belgrade in 1966, and in 1969 he finished the third degree of studies at the printing department of AFA. Since 1980 he worked as an assistant at the Academy in Belgrade. In 1989 he was promoted to associate professor, and in 1993 to full professor of the AFA. He died in Belgrade in 1995.
