= Knezovec =

- Village
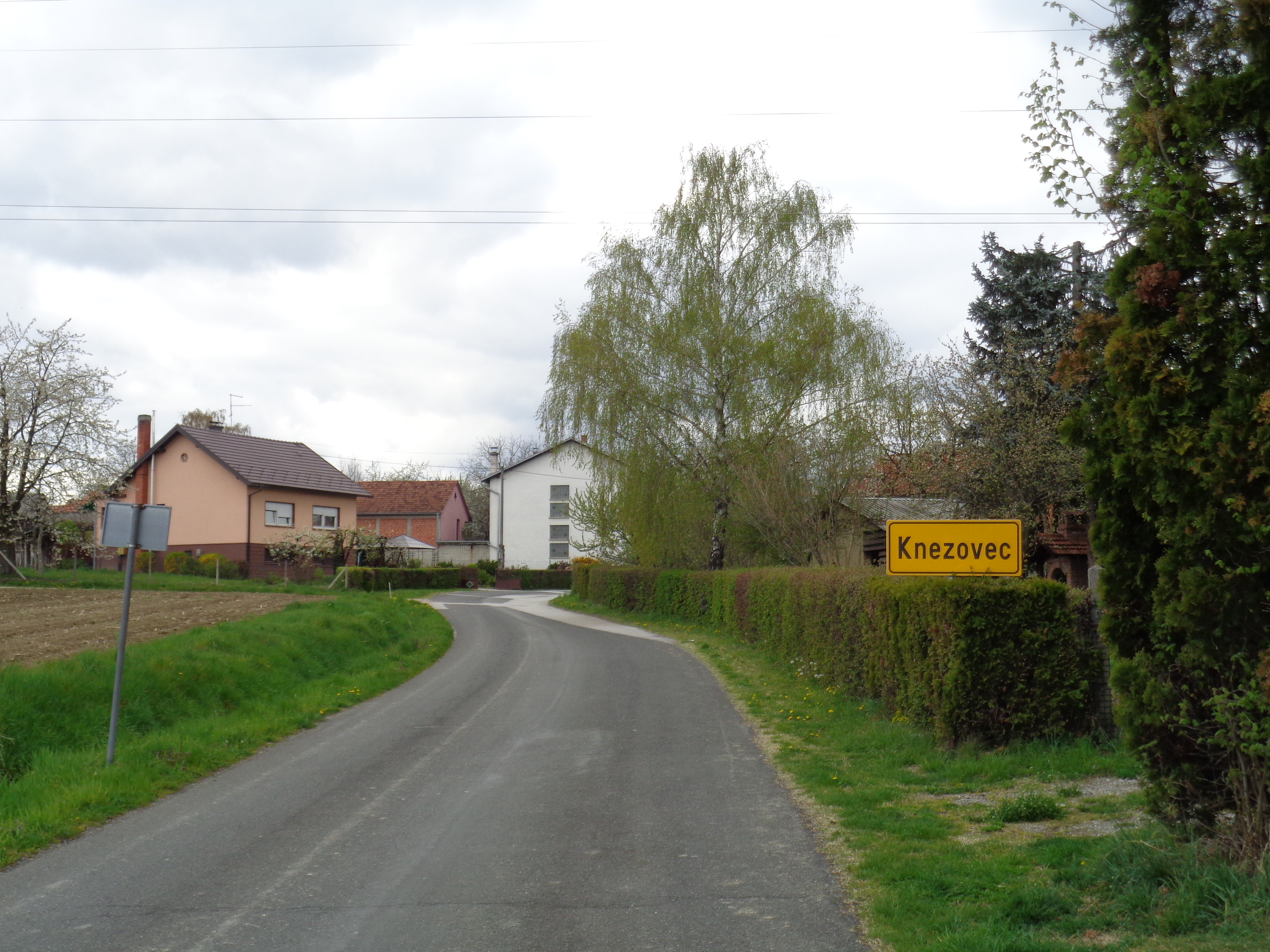

- Location within Croatia
- Coordinates: 46°26′10″N 16°24′47″E
- Country: Croatia
- County: Međimurje County
- Municipality: Šenkovec

Area
  - Total: 2.1 km^{2} (0.81 sq mi)

Population (2021)
  - Total: 372
  - Density: 180/km^{2} (460/sq mi)
- Time zone: UTC+1 (CET)
  - Summer (DST): UTC+2 (CEST)
- Postal code: 40000 Čakovec

Knezovec (Hungarian: Gyümölcsfalva) is a village in Croatia.
