= Šenkovec =

- Municipality
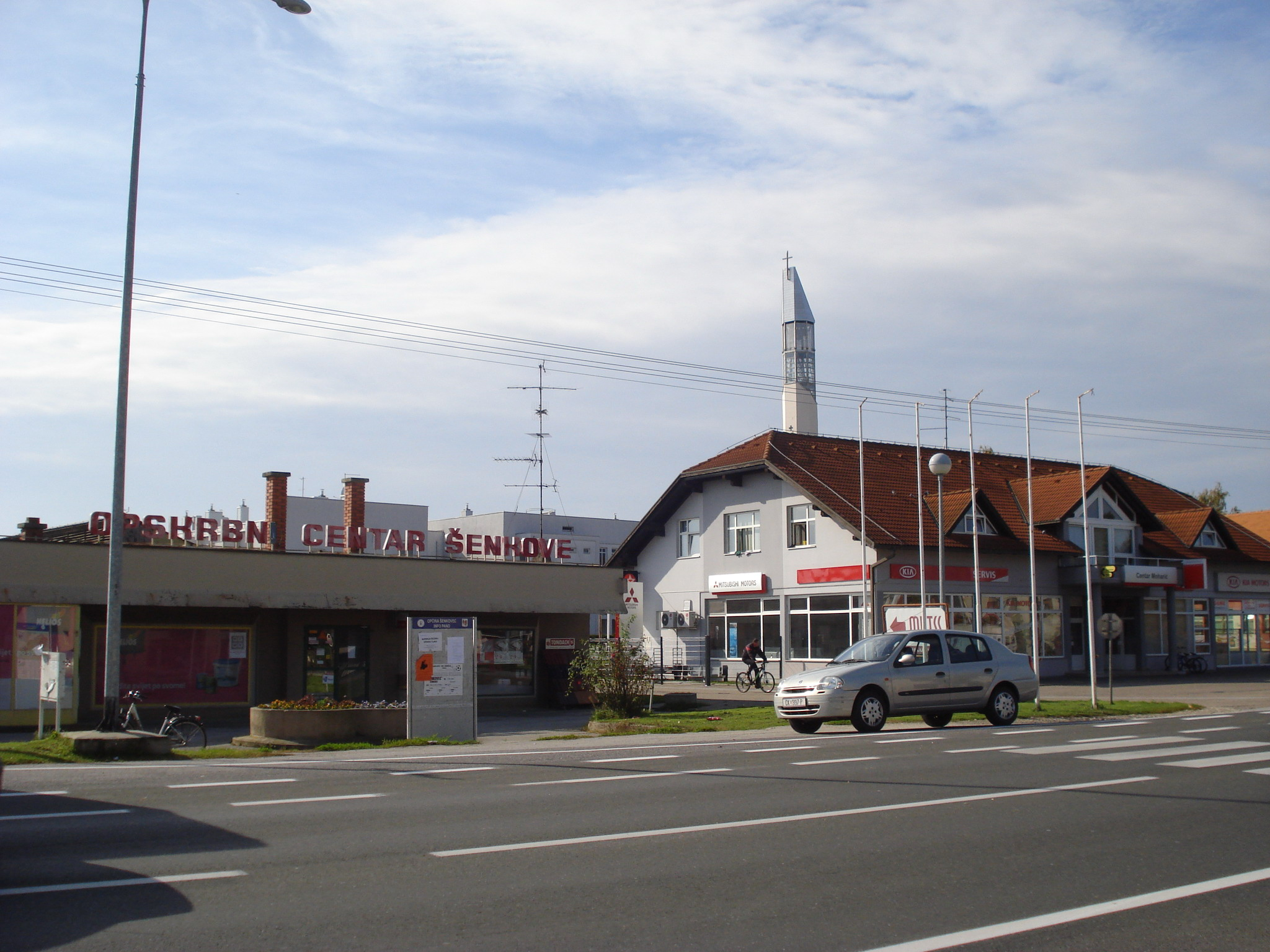
- Village centre

- Location within Croatia
- Coordinates: 46°25′N 16°25′E
- Country: Croatia
- Region: Northern Croatia (Međimurje)
- County: Međimurje County

Government
  - Municipal mayor: Zoran Kolar (Independent)

Area
  - Municipality: 9.0 km^{2} (3.5 sq mi)
  - Urban: 6.9 km^{2} (2.7 sq mi)

Population (2021)
  - Municipality: 2,708
  - Density: 300/km^{2} (780/sq mi)
  - Urban: 2,336
  - Urban density: 340/km^{2} (880/sq mi)
- Time zone: UTC+1 (CET)
  - Summer (DST): UTC+2 (CEST)
- Postal code: 40000 Čakovec
- Area code: 040
- Website: senkovec.hr

Šenkovec (Hungarian: Szentilona) is a municipality and village in Međimurje County, Croatia, located just outside the county seat, Čakovec.

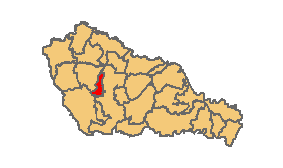
Location within Međimurje County

The village of Šenkovec has its own elementary school and kindergarten, as well as a sports hall and library. The pulmonology department of the Čakovec County Hospital is located in the Ksajpa neighbourhood of Šenkovec. There are two chapels in the municipality – the Holy Trinity Chapel in Šenkovec and the Saint Florian Chapel in Knezovec. The old Saint Jelena Chapel in Šenkovec is a listed building.

== History ==
The DVD "EKO Međimurje" was founded there in 1959.

== Geography ==
The municipality of Šenkovec is located in the central part of Međimurje County and has an area of 9.18 km^{2}. It is the third smallest municipality in Međimurje County and makes up 1.26% of the total area of the county.

== Demographics ==
In the 2021 census, the municipality had a population of 2,708 in the following settlements:

- Knezovec, population 372
- Šenkovec, population 2,336

The majority of inhabitants are Croats making up 98% of population.

Šenkovec: Population trends 1857–2021
v

population	320	416	525	570	628	686	731	874	1213	1417	1637	1726	2311	2537	2770	2879	2708
	1857	1869	1880	1890	1900	1910	1921	1931	1948	1953	1961	1971	1981	1991	2001	2011	2021

Sources: Croatian Bureau of Statistics publications

== Administration ==
The current mayor of Šenkovec is Zoran Kolar and the Šenkovec Municipal Council consists of 13 seats.

Groups	Councilors per group
Grouping of electors	4 / 13
HNS	4 / 13
NPS-HSU-Social Democrats-HSS	3 / 13
Grouping of electors	1 / 13
SDP	1 / 13

== Gallery ==
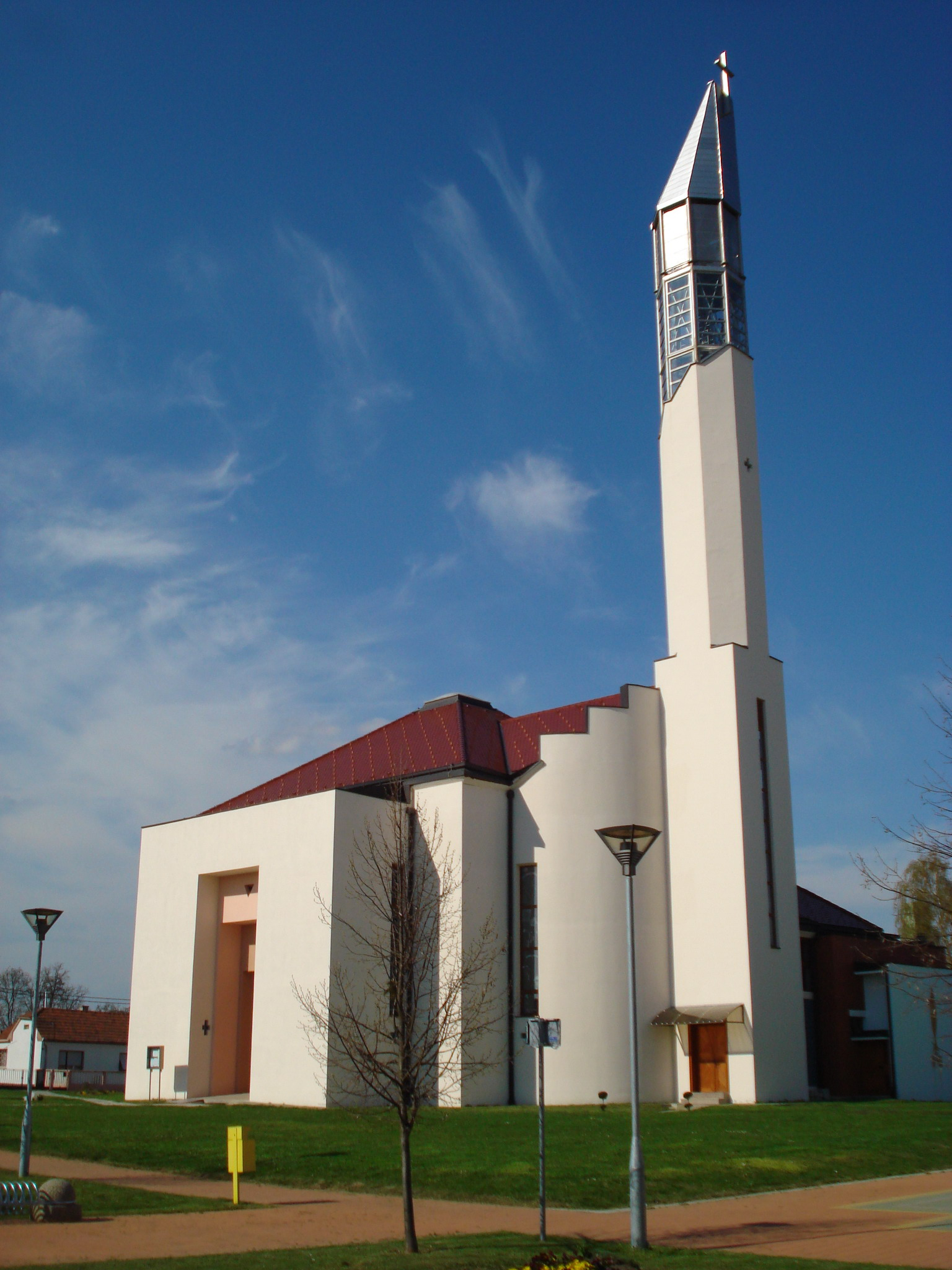
Church of Saint Helen

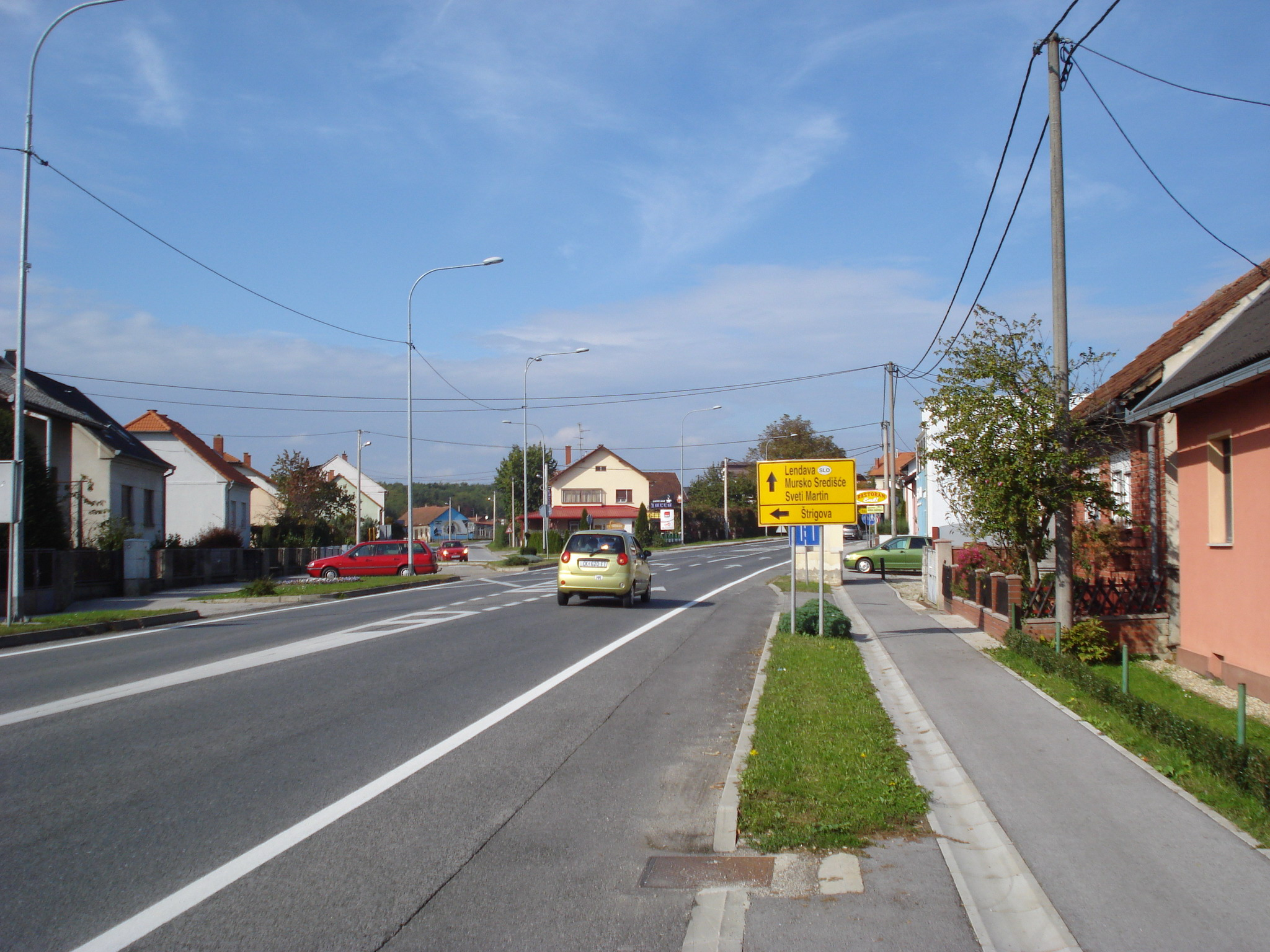
Main Street

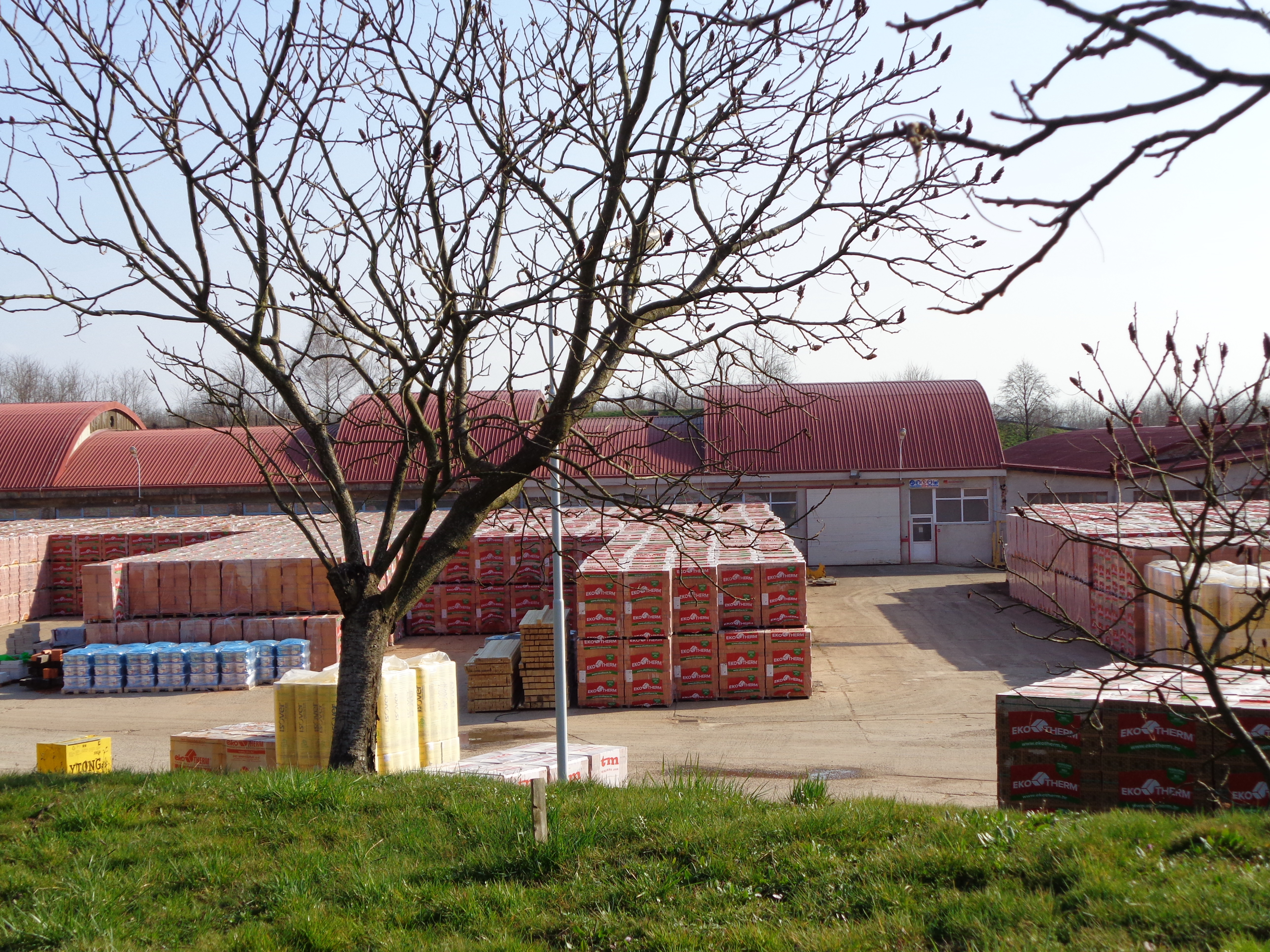
EKO Međimurje brick factory

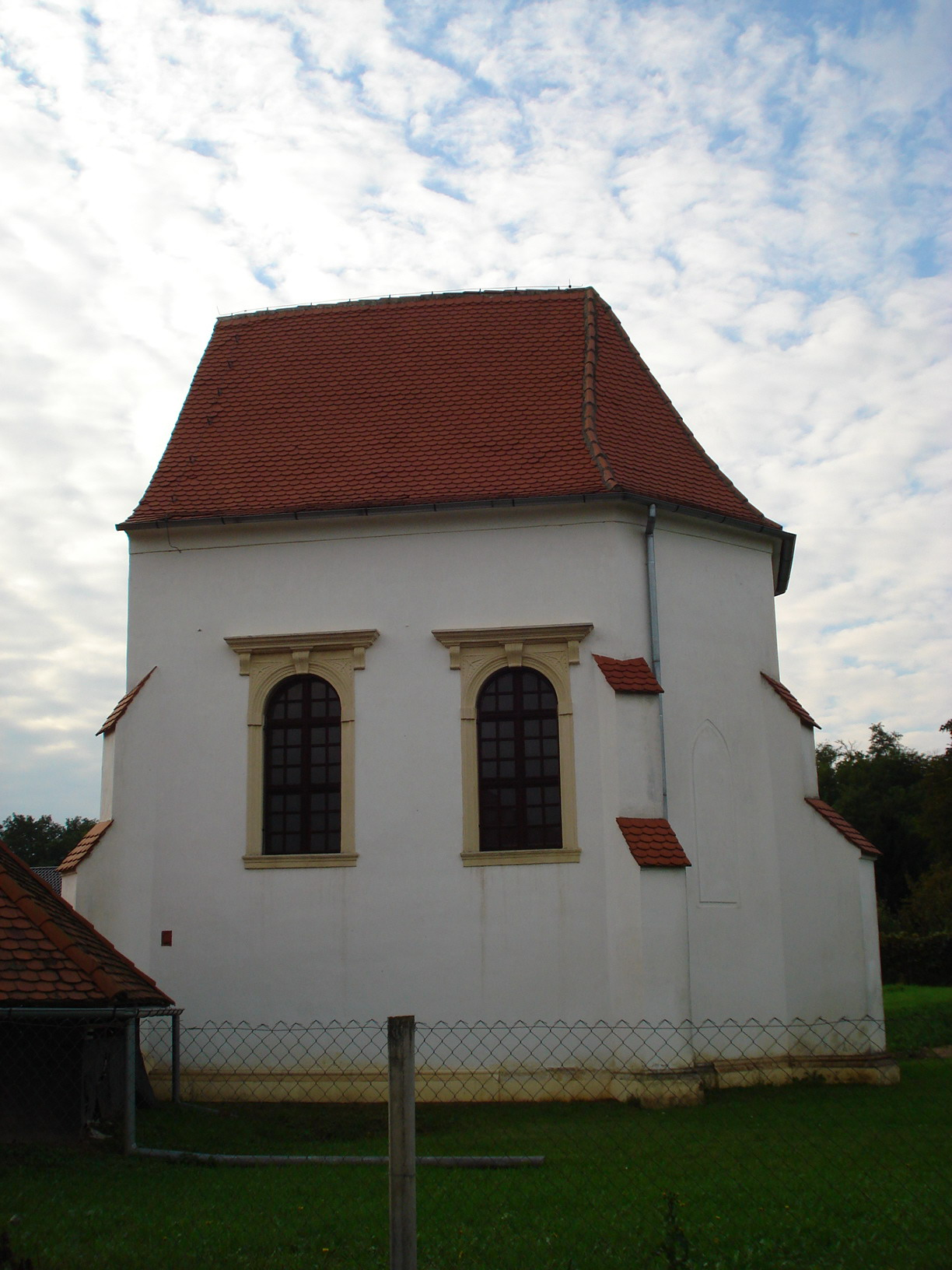
Chapel of Saint Helen
