= Sveta Jelena, Međimurje =

Coordinates: 45°54′N 16°16′E

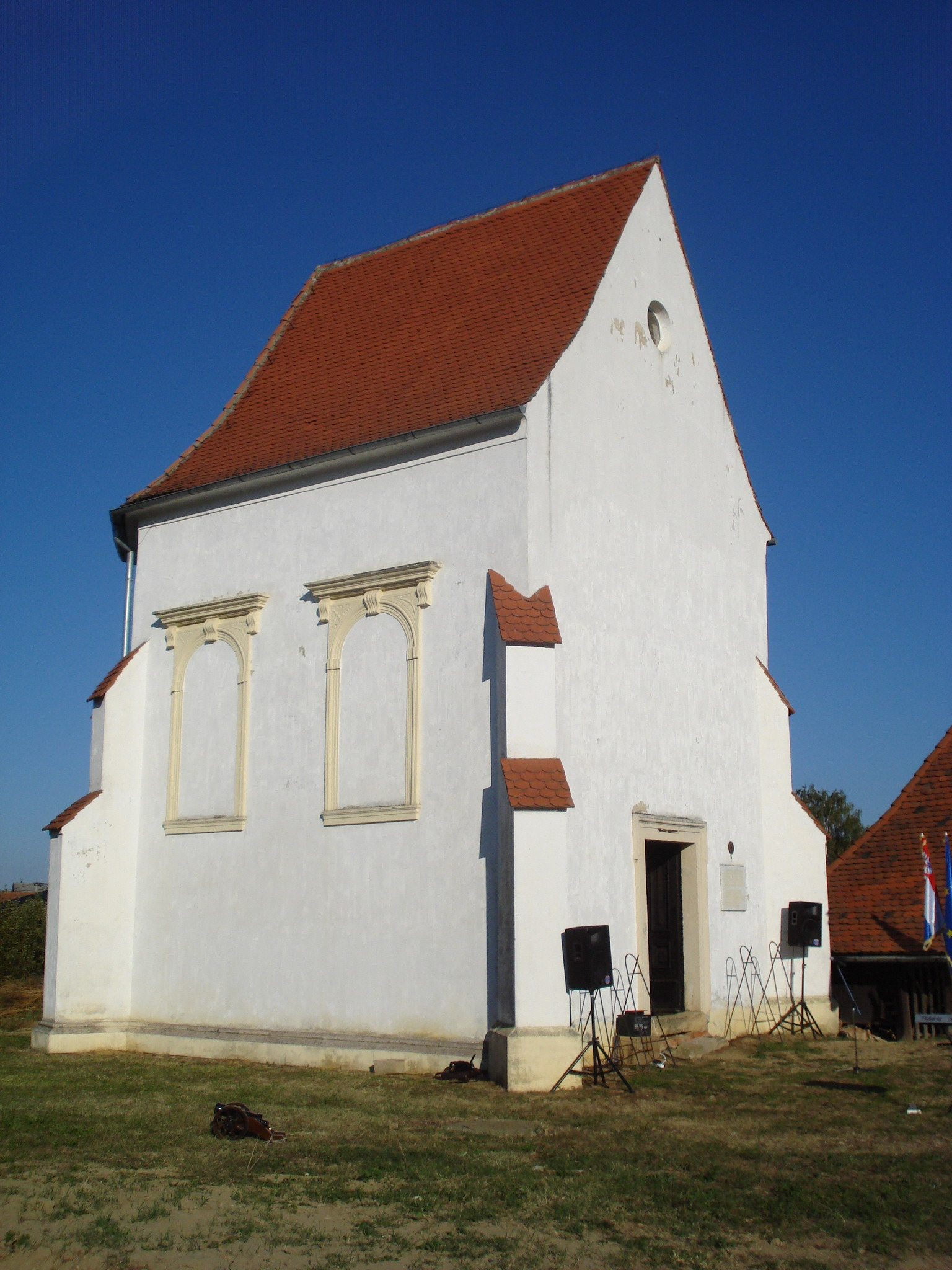
The chapel of St. Helen

Sveta Jelena (Croatian pronunciation: [ˈsveta jeˈlena]; English: Saint Helen) is a historic medieval site in Međimurje County, northern Croatia.

Originally a distinct settlement, Sveta Jelena is part of the Šenkovec municipality, about two kilometres away from Čakovec to the north. The site is well known for its Pauline monastery of St. Helen and associated facilities. Members of the Zrinski noble family were buried in a mausoleum there. From the whole monastery complex, only the St. Helen's Chapel still exists.

The monastery itself was founded by Stephen II Lackfi, Lord of Međimurje and Ban of Croatia, on 27 August 1376 and dedicated to Blessed Virgin Mary and All Saints. After Joseph II, Holy Roman Emperor and the King of Croatia abolished the Paulists' provinces in his Empire on 7 February 1786, the members of the Order left Sveta Jelena.

Over time, the monastery complex had to be rebuilt several times after being damaged by disasters such as fires and earthquakes. In particular, a large earthquake in 1880 nearly destroyed the building. Partial archaeological excavations have been carried out recently by the local Međimurje County Museum in Čakovec.

== Burials at the monastery ==
- Nikola Šubić Zrinski
- Juraj V Zrinski

== Image gallery ==
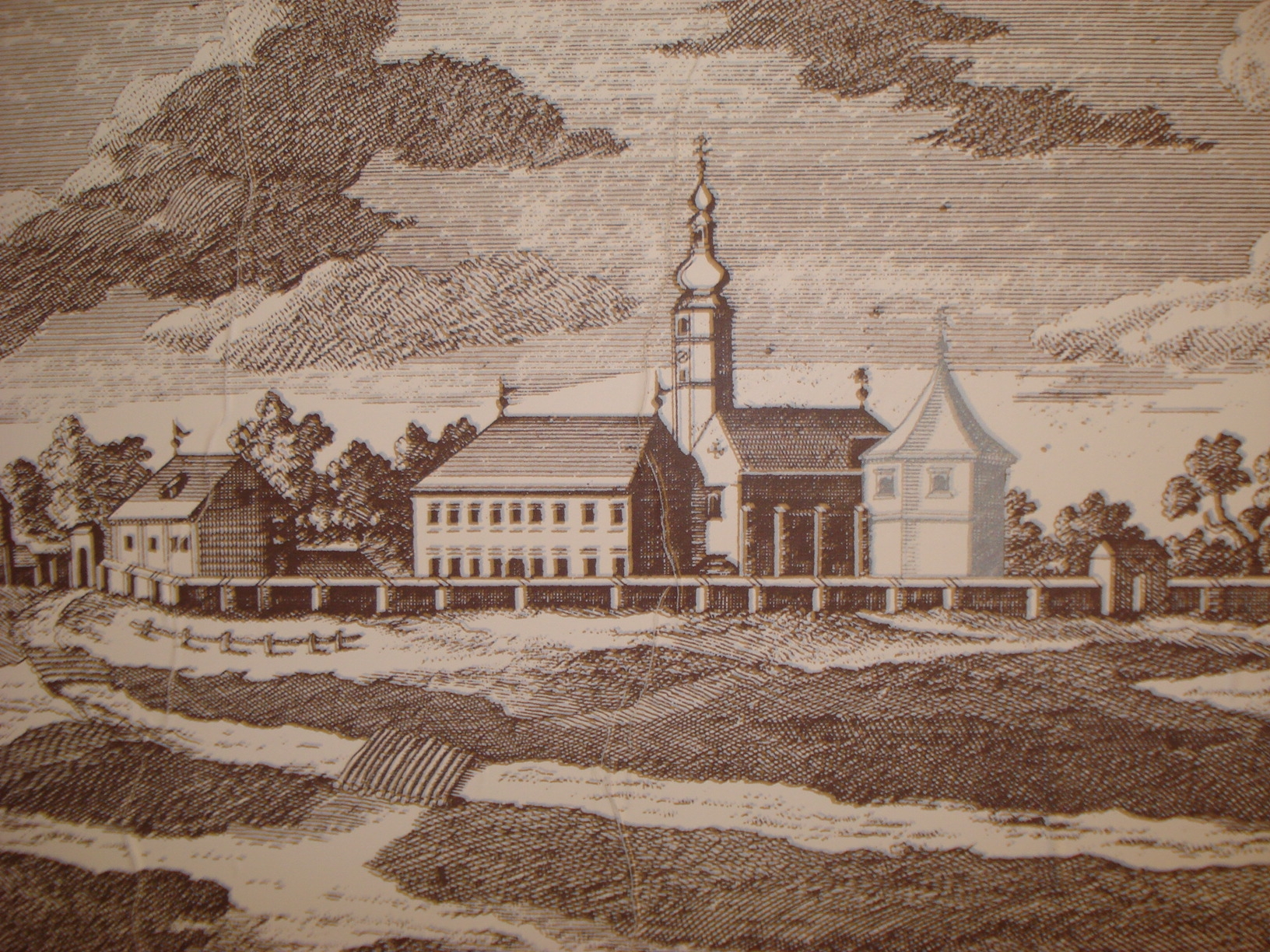
Pauline monastery in the 18th century

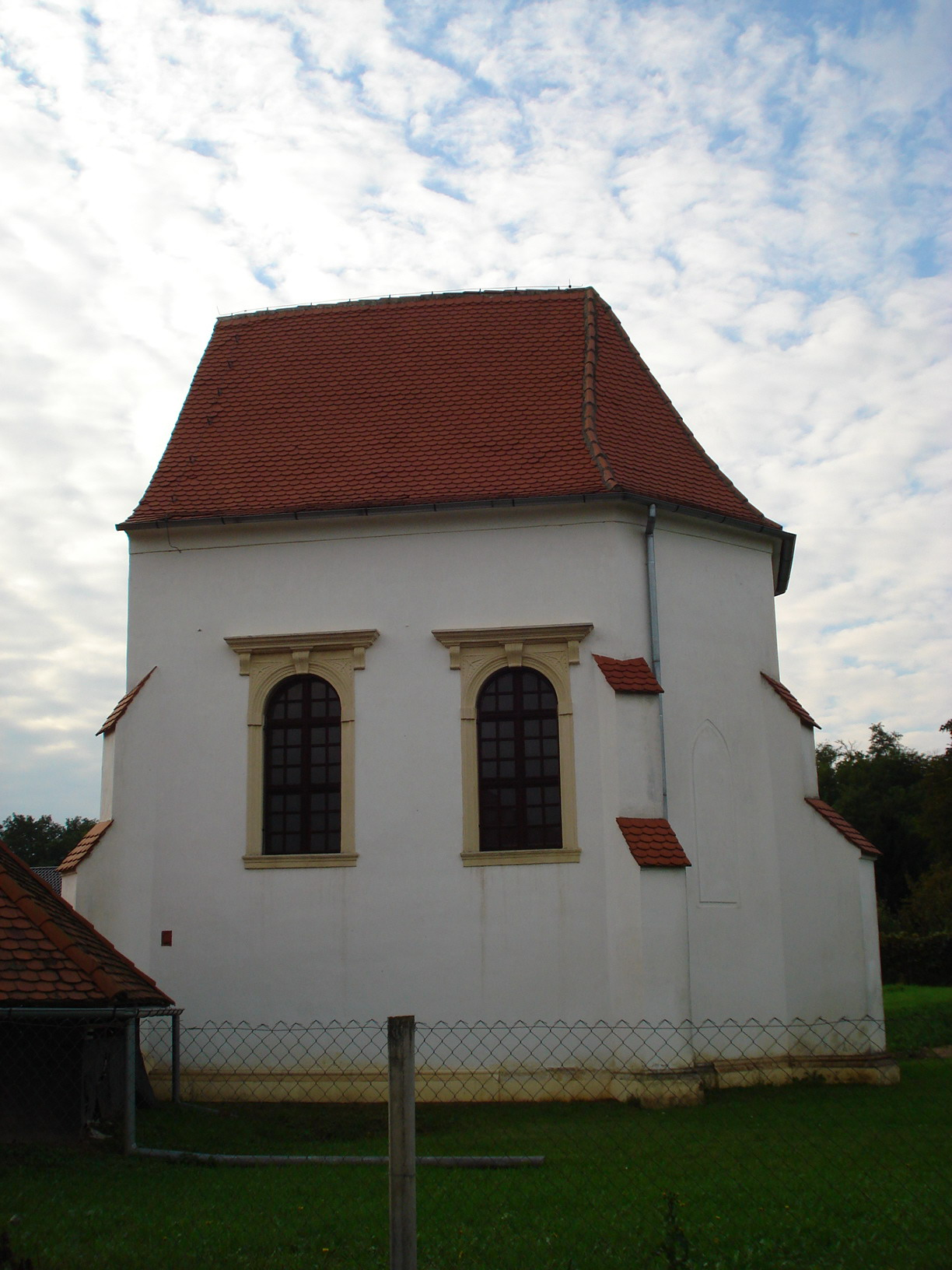
Chapel: south view

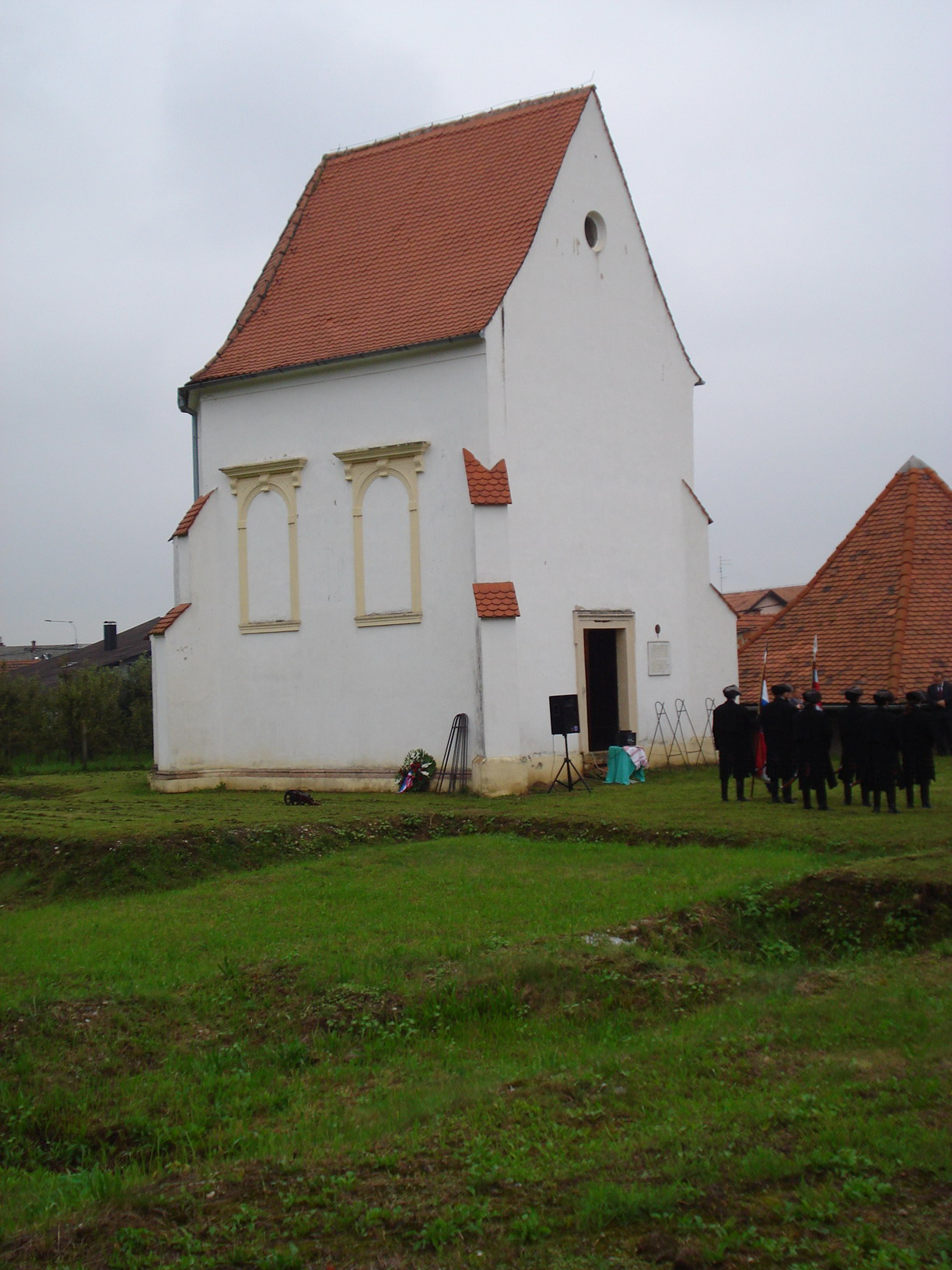
The remains of the monastery and the chapel

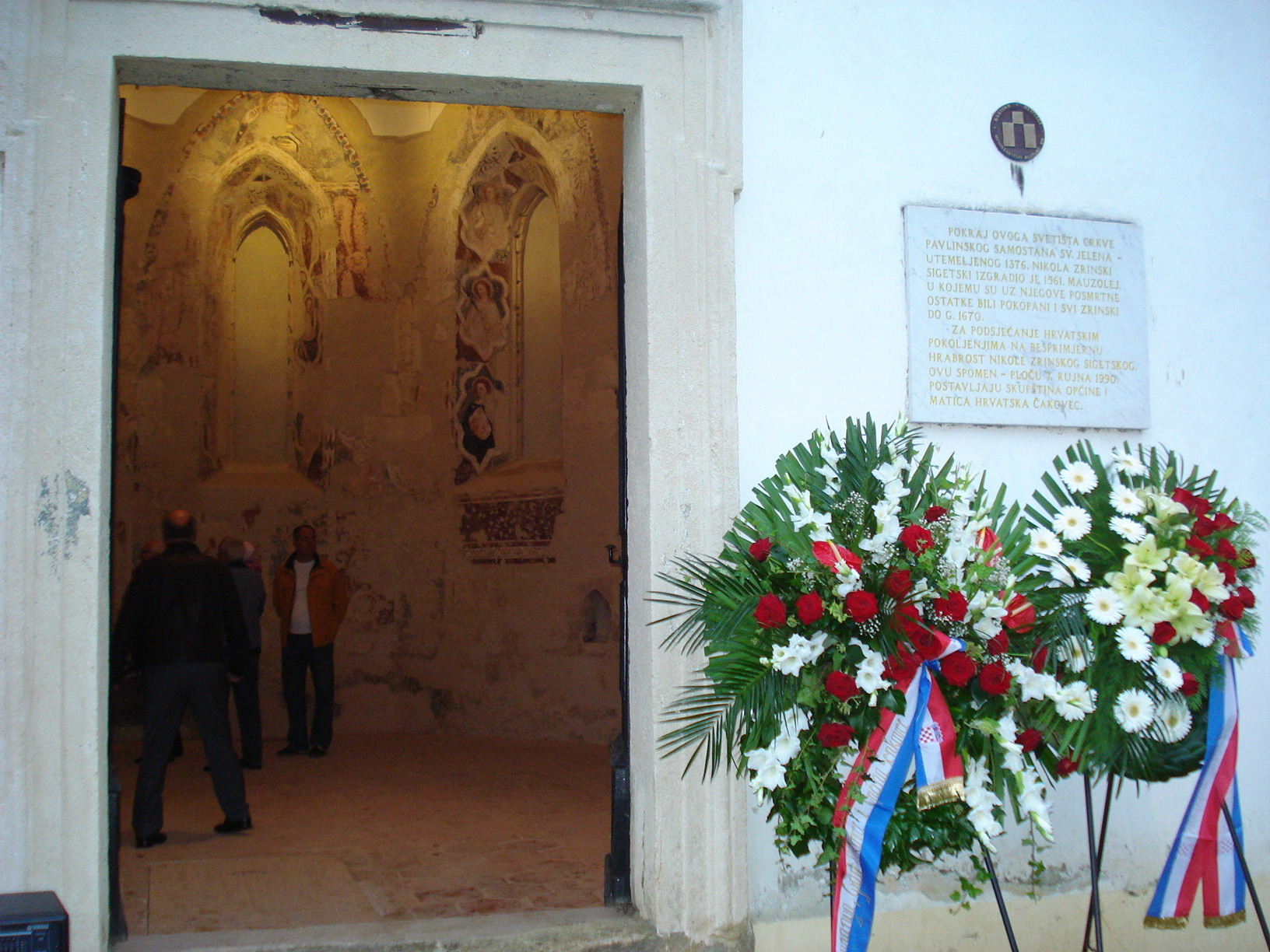
Entrance

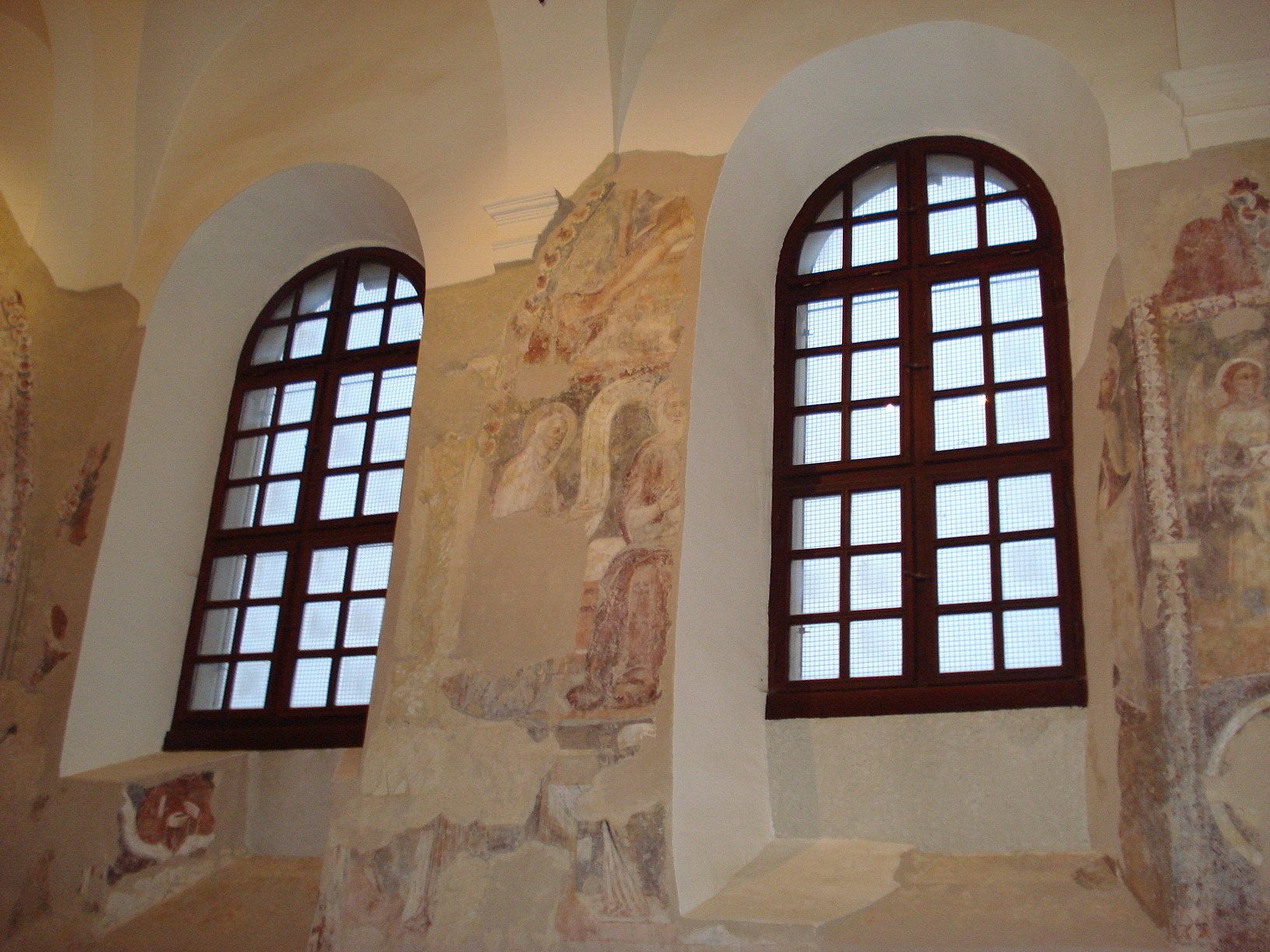
South wall

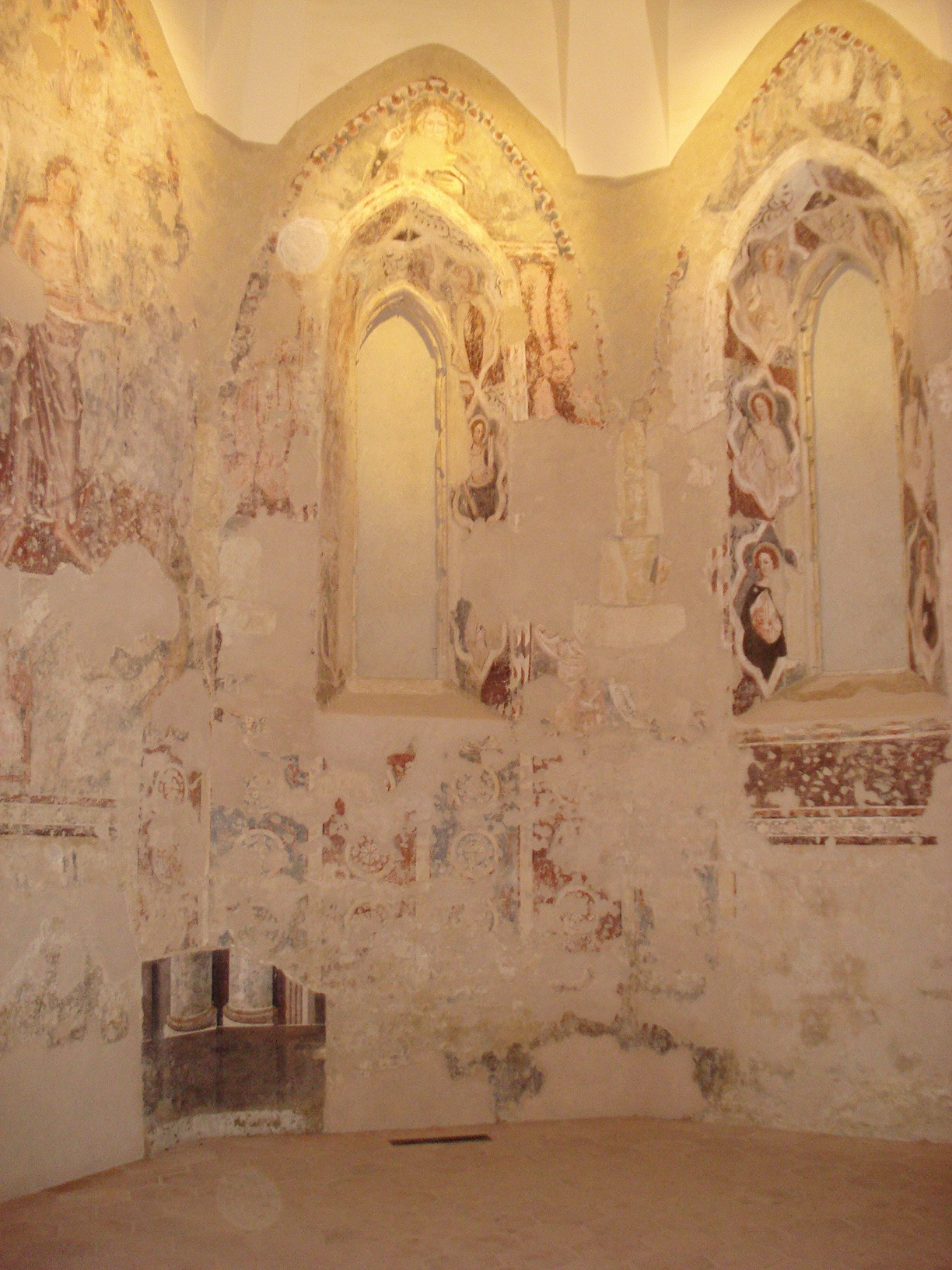
Frescos
